= List of prehistoric cartilaginous fish genera =

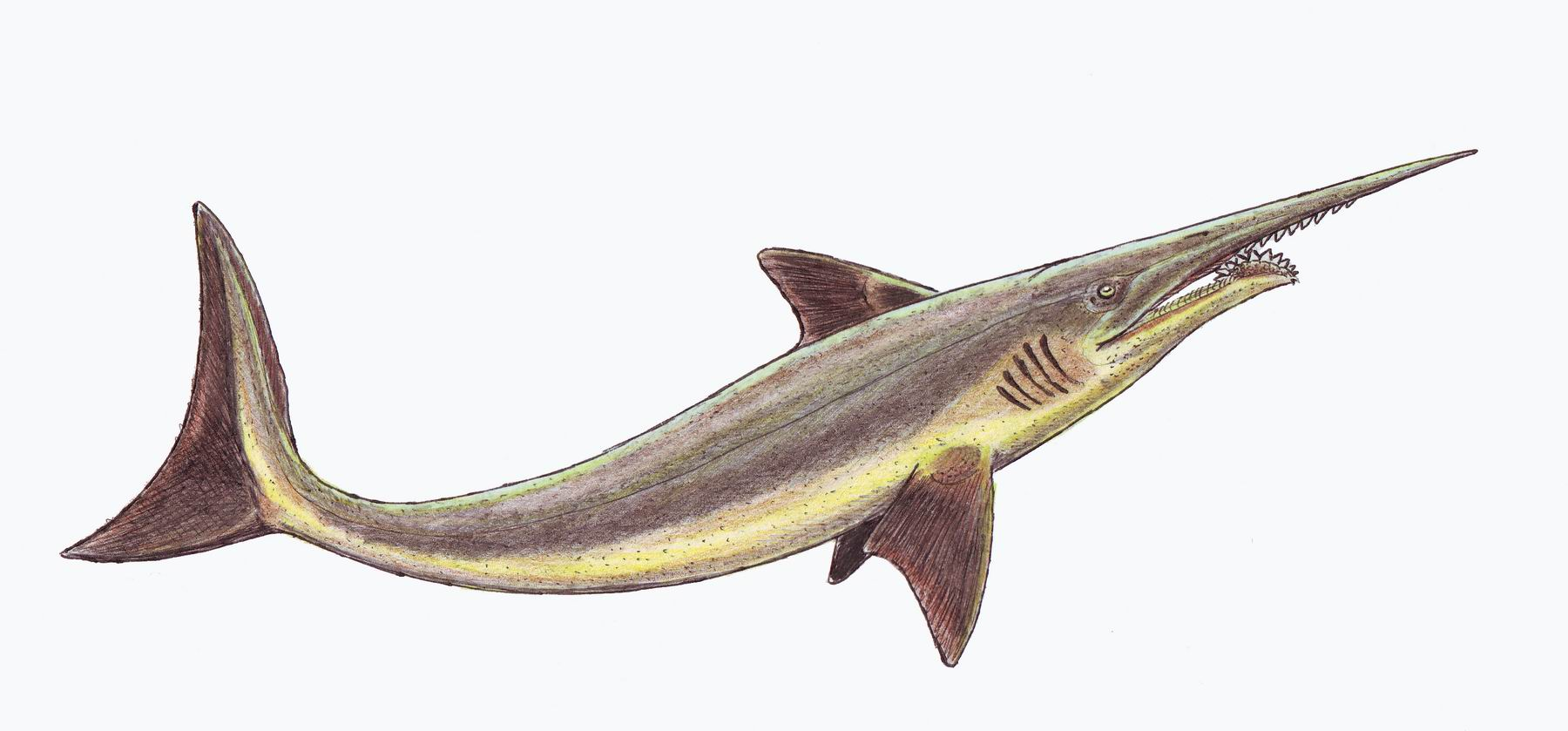
Sarcoprion edax

This list of prehistoric cartilaginous fish genera is an attempt to create a comprehensive listing of all genera that have ever been included in the class chondrichthyes and are known from the fossil record. This list excludes purely vernacular terms, genera that are now considered invalid, doubtful (nomina dubia), or were not formally published (nomina nuda), as well as junior synonyms of more established names, and genera that are no longer considered to be cartilaginous fish. It includes all commonly accepted genera.

This list currently contains 804 generic names.

- Extinct genera are marked by a dagger (†).
- Extant taxon genera are **bolded**.

== Naming conventions and terminology ==
Naming conventions and terminology follow the International Code of Zoological Nomenclature. Technical terms used include:

- Junior synonym: A name which describes the same taxon as a previously published name. If two or more genera are formally designated and the type specimens are later assigned to the same genus, the first to be published (in chronological order) is the senior synonym, and all other instances are junior synonyms. Senior synonyms are generally used, except by special decision of the ICZN, but junior synonyms cannot be used again, even if deprecated. Junior synonymy is often subjective, unless the genera described were both based on the same type specimen.
- **Nomen nudum** (Latin for "naked name"): A name that has appeared in print but has not yet been formally published by the standards of the ICZN. Nomina nuda (the plural form) are invalid, and are therefore not italicized as a proper generic name would be. If the name is later formally published, that name is no longer a nomen nudum and will be italicized on this list. Often, the formally published name will differ from any nomina nuda that describe the same specimen.
- **Nomen oblitum** (Latin for "forgotten name"): A name that has not been used in the scientific community for more than fifty years after its original proposal.
- Preoccupied name: A name that is formally published, but which has already been used for another taxon. This second use is invalid (as are all subsequent uses) and the name must be replaced. As preoccupied names are not valid generic names, they will also go unitalicized on this list.
- **Nomen dubium** (Latin for "dubious name"): A name describing a fossil with no unique diagnostic features. As this can be an extremely subjective and controversial designation, this term is not used on this list.

== A ==
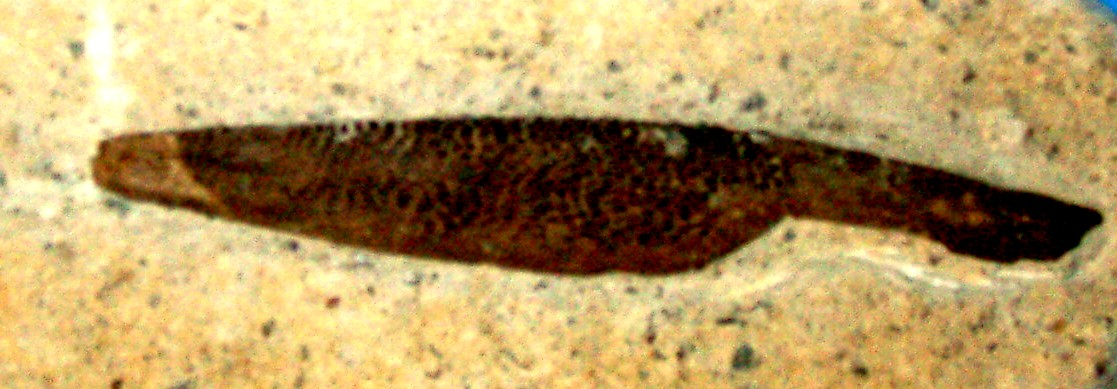
Asteracanthus ornatissimus

- †Abdounia Cappetta, 1980
  - †Abdounia africana Arambourg, 1952
  - †Abdounia beaugei Arambourg, 1935
  - †Abdounia belselensis Mollen, 2007
  - †Abdounia biauriculata Casier, 1946
  - †Abdounia enniskilleni White, 1956
  - †Abdounia finalis Arambourg, 1952
  - †Abdounia furimskyi Case, 1980
  - †Abdounia lapierrei Cappetta & Nolf, 1981
  - †Abdounia lata Malyshkina, 2012
  - †Abdounia mesetae Engelbrecht, Mörs, Reguero & Kriwet, 2017
  - †Abdounia minutissima Winkler, 1874
  - †Abdounia osipovae Averianov & Udovitshenko, 1993
  - †Abdounia recticona Winkler, 1874
  - †Abdounia richteri Engelbrecht, Mörs, Reguero & Kriwet, 2017
  - †Abdounia vassilyevae Malyshkina, 2012
- †Acanthorhachis Martill, Del Strother & Gallien, 2014
  - † Acanthorhachis spinatus Bolton, 1896
- †Acanthorhina Fraas, 1910
  - † Acanthorhina jaekeli Fraas, 1910
- †Acmoniodus Hussakof & Bryant, 1918
  - † Acmoniodus clarkei Hussakof & Bryant, 1918
- †Acondylacanthus Maisey, 1984
  - † Acondylacanthus nuperus St. John & Worthen, 1883
- †Acrodonchus Fraas, 1889
  - †Acrodonchus minimus Agassiz, 1839
- †Acrodus Agassiz in Alberti, 1834
  - †Acrodus affinis Reuss, 1845
  - †Acrodus alexandrae Wemple, 1906
  - †Acrodus angustus Giebel, 1848
  - †Acrodus anningiae Agassiz, 1843
  - †Acrodus biscrasseplicatus Xing-Xu, 1980
  - †Acrodus braunii Agassiz, 1843
  - †Acrodus caledonicus Rees & Underwood, 2006
  - †Acrodus cuneocostatus Cuny, Rieppel & Sander, 2001
  - †Acrodus curtus Agassiz, 1837
  - †Acrodus flexuosus Schafhäutl, 1863
  - †Acrodus gaillardoti Agassiz in Alberti, 1834
  - †Acrodus georgii Mutter, 1998
  - †Acrodus gibberulus Agassiz, 1843
  - †Acrodus hirudo Agassiz, 1843
  - †Acrodus kalasinensis Cuny, Liard, Deesri, Liard, Kamha & Suttethorn, 2013
  - †Acrodus keuperinus Murchison & Strickland, 1840
  - †Acrodus lateralis Agassiz, 1843
  - †Acrodus latus Agassiz, 1839
  - †Acrodus leiopleurus Agassiz, 1843
  - †Acrodus mutteri Delsate & Duffin, 1999
  - †Acrodus nobilis Agassiz, 1843
  - †Acrodus olsoni Johnson, 1981
  - †Acrodus oreodontus Wemple, 1906
  - †Acrodus personati Quenstedt, 1858
  - †Acrodus substriatus Schmid, 1861
  - †Acrodus sweetlacruzensis Johnson, 1981
  - †Acrodus undulatus Agassiz, 1843
- †Acronemus Rieppel, 1982
  - † Acronemus tuberculatus Bassani, 1886
- †Acrorhizodus Cappetta, Buffetaut, Cuny & Suttethorn, 2006
  - †Acrorhizodus khoratensis Cappetta, Buffetaut, Cuny & Suttethorn, 2006
- †Acrosqualiolus Adnet, 2006
  - †Acrosqualiolus mirus Adnet, 2006
- †Acutalamna Guinot & Carrillo-Briceño, 2018
  - †Acutalamna karsteni Guinot & Carrillo-Briceño, 2018
- †Adamantina Bendix-Almgreen, 1993
  - †Adamantina benedictae Bendix-Almgreen, 1993
  - †Adamantina foliacea Ivanov, 1999
- †Adnetoscyllium Guinot, Underwood, Cappetta & Ward, 2013
  - † Adnetoscyllium angloparisensis Guinot, Underwood, Cappetta & Ward, 2013
- **Aetobatus** Blainville, 1816
  - †Aetobatus arcuatus Agassiz, 1843
  - †Aetobatus cappettai Antunes & Balbino, 2006
  - †Aetobatus irregularis Agassiz, 1843
  - †Aetobatus punctatus Miller, 1876
  - †Aetobatus poeyi Fernández de Castro 1873
  - †Aetobatus sinhaleyus Deraniyagala, 1937
- **Aetomylaeus** Garman, 1908
  - †Aetomylaeus cojimarensis Iturralde-Vinent, Mora, Rojas & Gutierrez, 1998
  - †Aetomylaeus cubensis Iturralde-Vinent, Mora, Rojas & Gutierrez, 1998
- †Agaleorhynchus Guinot, Cappetta, Underwood & Ward, 2012
  - †Agaleorhynchus britannicus Guinot, Cappetta, Underwood & Ward, 2012
- †Agaleus Duffin & Ward, 1983
  - †Agaleus dorsetensis Duffin & Ward, 1983
- †Agassizodus St. John & Worthen, 1875
  - †Agassizodus variabilis Newberry & Worthen, 1870
- †Ageleodus Owen, 1867
  - †Ageleodus altus Garvey & Turner, 2006
  - †Ageleodus pectinatus Agassiz, 1838
- †Agkistracanthus Duffin & Furrer, 1981
  - † Agkistracanthus mitgelensis Duffin & Furrer, 1981
- †Akaimia Rees, 2010
  - †Akaimia altucuspis Rees, 2010
  - †Akaimia myriacuspis Srdic, Duffin & Martill, 2016
- †Akmonistion Coates & Sequeira, 2001
  - †Akmonistion zangerli Coates & Sequeira, 2001
- †Aktaua Case, Udovitshenko, Nessov, Averianov & Borodin, 1996
  - †Aktaua kizylkumensis Case, Udovitshenko, Nessov, Averianov & Borodin, 1996
- †Alethodontus Duffin, 1983
  - †Alethodontus bavariensis Duffin, 1983
- **Alopias** Rafinesque, 1810
  - †Alopias acutidens Casier, 1958
  - †Alopias alabamensis White, 1956
  - †Alopias carolinensis White, 1956
  - †Alopias crochardi Ward, 1978
  - †Alopias denticulatus Cappetta, 1981
  - †Alopias exigua Probst, 1879
  - †Alopias hassei Noetling, 1885
  - †Alopias hermani Kozlov, 1999
  - †Alopias latidens Leriche, 1909
  - †Alopias leeensis Ward, 1978
  - †Alopias grandis
  - †Alopias palatasi Kent & Ward, 2018
  - †Alopias subexigua Dartevelle & Casier, 1959
- †Alopiopsis Lioy, 1865
  - †Alopiopsis plejodon Lioy, 1865
- †Altholepis Karatajute-Talimaa, 1997
  - †Altholepis composita Karatajute-Talimaa, 1997
  - †Altholepis salopensis Burrow & Turner, 2018
- †Altusmirus Fuchs, Engelbrecht, Lukeneder & Kriwet, 2018
  - †Altusmirus triquetrus Fuchs, Engelbrecht, Lukeneder & Kriwet, 2018
- †Amamriabatis Adnet, Marivaux, Cappetta, Charruault, Essid, Jiquel, Ammar, Marandat, Marzougui, Merzeraud, Temani, Vianey-Liaud & Tabuce, 2020
  - †Amamriabatis heni Adnet, Marivaux, Cappetta, Charruault, Essid, Jiquel, Ammar, Marandat, Marzougui, Merzeraud, Temani, Vianey-Liaud & Tabuce, 2020
- †Amblypristis Dames, 1888
  - †Amblypristis cheops Dames, 1888
- †Amelacanthus Maisey, 1982
  - † Amelacanthus laevis (Davis, 1883)
  - † Amelacanthus plicatus ( Davis, 1883)
  - † Amelacanthus pustulatus (Davis, 1883)
  - †Amelacanthus americanus Maisey, 1983
  - †Amelacanthus sulcatus Agassiz, 1837
- †Amylodon Storms, 1894
  - †Amylodon eocenica Woodward & White, 1930
  - †Amylodon karamysh Averianov & Popov, 1995
  - †Amylodon venablesae Casier, 1966
  - †Amylodon delheidi Storms, 1895
- † Anachronistes Duffin & Ward 1983
  - † Anachronistes amazonensis (Duffin, Richter & Neis 1996)
  - † Anachronistes fordi Duffin & Ward 1983
- † Anareodus Long & Young, 1995
  - † Anareodus statei Long & Young, 1995
- †Angolabatis Antunes & Cappetta, 2006
  - †Angolabatis benguelaensis Antunes & Cappetta, 2002
- †Angoumeius Adnet, Cappetta & Reynders, 2006
  - † Angoumeius paradoxus Adnet, 2000
- †Anisopleurodontis Silva Santos, 1994
  - †Anisopleurodontis pricei Silva Santos, 1994
- †Ankistrorhynchus Casier, 1964
  - †Ankistrorhynchus lonzeensis Casier, 1964
  - †Ankistrorhynchus major Cappetta & Case, 1975
  - †Ankistrorhynchus washakiensis Case, 1987
- †Annea Thies, 1983
  - †Annea carinata Thies, 1983
  - †Annea maubeugei Delsate & Thies, 1995
- †Annulicorona Chen & Cuny, 2003
  - † Annulicorona pyramidalis Chen & Cuny, 2003
- †Anodontacanthus Davis, 1881
  - †Anodontacanthus alatus Davis, 1880
  - †Anodontacanthus belemnoideus Zidek, 1978
  - †Anodontacanthus triangularis Davis, 1880
- †Anomotodon Arambourg, 1952
  - †Anomotodon cravenensis Case, 1980
  - †Anomotodon genaulti Guinot, Underwood, Cappetta & Ward, 2013
  - †Anomotodon hermani Siverson, 1992
  - †Anomotodon kozlovi Adnet, 2000
  - †Anomotodon laevis Herman, 1982
  - †Anomotodon multidenticulata Long, 1992
  - †Anomotodon novus Winkler, 1876
  - †Anomotodon plicatus Arambourg, 1952
  - †Anomotodon principialis Cappetta, 1975
  - †Anomotodon sheppeyensis Casier, 1966
  - †Anomotodon toddi Case & Cappetta, 1997
- †Anotodus Le Hon, 1871
  - †Anotodus agassizii Le Hon, 1871
- **Anoxypristis** White & Moy-Thomas, 1941
  - †Anoxypristis fajumensis Stromer, 1905
  - †Anoxypristis mucrodens White, 1926
  - †Anoxypristis osonensis Farres, 2003
- †Antarctilamna Young, 1982
  - †Antarctilamna prisca Young, 1982
  - †Antarctilamna seriponensis Gagnier, Turner, Friman, Suarez-Riglos & Janvier, 1988
  - †Antarctilamna ultima Gess & Coates, 2015
- †Antliodus Newberry & Worthen, 1866
  - †Antliodus arcuatus Newberry, 1889
  - †Antliodus cucullus Newberry & Worthen, 1866
  - †Antliodus gracilis St. John & Worthen, 1875
  - †Antliodus minutes Newberry & Worthen, 1866
  - †Antliodus mucronatus Newberry & Worthen, 1866
  - †Antliodus parvulus Newberry & Worthen, 1866
  - †Antliodus perovalis St. John & Worthen, 1875
  - †Antliodus politus Newberry & Worthen, 1866
  - †Antliodus robustus Newberry & Worthen, 1866
  - †Antliodus sarcululus Newberry & Worthen, 1870
  - †Antliodus similis Newberry & Worthen, 1866
  - †Antliodus simplex Newberry & Worthen, 1866
  - †Antliodus sulcatus Newberry & Worthen, 1866
  - †Antliodus truncates Anonymous author(s)
- †Antrigoulia Guinot, Cappetta & Adnet, 2014
  - †Antrigoulia circumplicata Guinot, Cappetta & Adnet, 2014
- †Apocopodon Cope, 1885
  - †Apocopodon sericeus Cope, 1885
- **Apristurus** Garman, 1913
  - †Apristurus sereti Adnet, 2006
- **Aptychotrema** Norman, 1926
  - †Aptychotrema massoniae Bernardez, 2002
- †Aquilolamna Vullo, Frey, Ifrim, González González, Stinnesbeck, & Stinnesbeck, 2021
  - †Aquilolamna milarcae Vullo, Frey, Ifrim, González González, Stinnesbeck, & Stinnesbeck, 2021
- †Araloselachus Glikman, 1964
  - †Araloselachus agespensis Glikman, 1964
  - †Araloselachus aralensis Glikman, 1964
    - †A. a. aralensis Glikman, 1964
    - †A. a. kutanbulaki Zhelezko, 1999
    - †A. a. nurensis Zhelezko, 1999
    - †A. a. solonovski Zhelezko, 1999
  - †Araloselachus turgaensis Zhelezko, 1999
- †Archaeogaleus Guinot, Cappetta & Adnet, 2014
  - †Archaeogaleus lengadocensis Guinot, Cappetta & Adnet, 2014
- †Archaeolamna Siverson, 1992
  - †Archaeolamna apophysata Li, 1995
  - †Archaeolamna haigi Siverson, 1996
  - †Archaeolamna kopingensis Davis, 1890
    - †A. k. judithensis Siverson, 1992
    - †A. k. kopingensis Davis, 1890
- †Archaeomanta Herman, 1979
  - †Archaeomanta hermani Kozlov, 2001
  - †Archaeomanta melenhorsti Herman, 1979
  - †Archaeomanta priemi Herman, 1979
- †Archaeotriakis Case, 1978
  - † Archaeotriakis ornatus Case, 1987
  - † Archaeotriakis rochelleae Case, 1978
- †Archingeayia Vullo, Cappetta & Néraudeau, 2007
  - † Archingeayia sistaci Vullo, Cappetta & Néraudeau, 2007
- †Arctacanthus Nielsen, 1932
  - † Arctacanthus exiguus Yamagishi, 2004
- †Arduodens Hairapetian & Ginter, 2009
  - † Arduodens flammeus Hairapetian & Ginter, 2009
- †Arechia Cappetta, 1983
  - †Arechia arambourgi Cappetta, 1983
  - †Arechia crassicaudata Blainville, 1818
- †Argoubia Adnet, Cappetta, Guinot & Notarbartolo Di Sciara, 2012
  - †Argoubia arnoldmülleri Leder, 2015
  - †Argoubia barbei Adnet, Cappetta, Guinot & Notarbartolo Di Sciara, 2012
- †Arnomobula Leder, 2015
  - †Arnomobula eythrai Leder, 2015
- †Arpagodus Trautschold, 1879
  - †Arpagodus rectangulus Trautschold, 1879
- †Artiodus Ivanov & Duffin in Ivanov, Duffin & Naugolnykh, 2017
  - †Artiodus prominens Ivanov & Duffin in Ivanov, Duffin & Naugolnykh, 2017
- †Asiodontus Nessov, Glikman & Mertiniene, 1991
  - †Asiodontus shuvalovi Nessov, Glikman & Mertiniene, 1991
- †Asteracanthus Agassiz, 1837
  - †Asteracanthus acutus Agassiz, 1843
  - †Asteracanthus aegyptiacus Stromer, 1927
  - †Asteracanthus biformatus Kriwet, 1995
  - †Asteracanthus granulosus Egerton, 1854
  - †Asteracanthus lepidus Dollfus, 1863
  - †Asteracanthus magnus Agassiz, 1838
  - †Asteracanthus minor Agassiz, 1843
  - †Asteracanthus ornatissimus Agassiz, 1837
  - †Asteracanthus patagonicus Ameghino, 1935
  - †Asteracanthus semisulcatus Agassiz, 1837
  - †Asteracanthus semiverrucosus Egerton, 1854
  - †Asteracanthus smithwoodwardi Peyer, 1946
  - †Asteracanthus somaensis Yabe, 1902
  - †Asteracanthus stutchburyi Agassiz, 1843
  - †Asteracanthus tenuis Agassiz, 1838
  - †Asteracanthus tetrastichodon Fricke, 1875
  - †Asteracanthus tridentinus Zittel, 1870
  - †Asteracanthus udulfensis Leuzinger, Cuny, Popov & Billon-Bruyat, 2017
  - †Asteracanthus verrucosus Egerton, 1854
  - †Asteracanthus wastensis Sauvage, 1880
- †Asterodermus Agassiz, 1843
  - † Asterodermus platypterus Agassiz, 1843
- †Asterotrygon Carvalho, Maisey & Grande, 2004
  - †Asterotrygon maloneyi Carvalho, Maisey & Grande, 2004
- †Ataktobatis Cappetta & Corral, 1999
  - † Ataktobatis variabilis Cappetta & Corral, 1999
- †Atlanticopristis Pereira & Medeiros, 2008
  - †Atlanticopristis equatorialis Pereira & Medeiros, 2008
- †Atlantitrygon Sambou, Hautier, Sarr, Tabuce, Lihoreau, Thiam, Lebrun, Martin, Cappetta & Adnet, 2020
  - †Atlantitrygon senegalensis Sambou, Hautier, Sarr, Tabuce, Lihoreau, Thiam, Lebrun, Martin, Cappetta & Adnet, 2020
  - †Atlantitrygon sudrei Cappetta, 1972
- **Atlantoraja** Menni, 1972
  - †Atlantoraja cecilae Steurbaut & Herman, 1978
- †Aturobatis Adnet, 2006
  - †Aturobatis aquensis Adnet, 2006
- †Australopristis Martill & Ibrahim, 2012
  - †Australopristis wiffeni Martill & Ibrahim, 2012
- †Avonacanthus Maisey, 2010
  - †Avonacanthus brevis Agassiz, 1837
- †Aztecodus Long & Young, 1995
  - †Aztecodus harmsenae Long & Young, 1995

== B ==
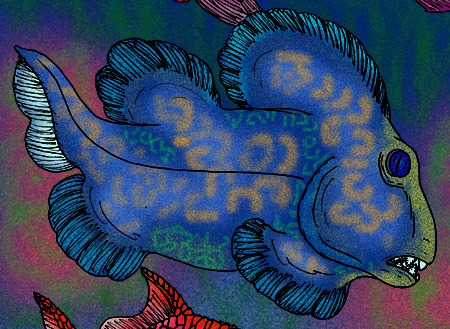
Belantsea montana

- †Baharipristis Werner, 1989
  - †Baharipristis bastetiae Werner, 1989
- †Bahariyodon Duffin, 2001
  - †Bahariyodon bartheli Werner, 1989
- †Bandringa Zangerl, 1969
  - †Bandringa rayi Zangerl, 1969
- †Barbclabornia Johnson, 2003
  - †Barbclabornia luedersensis Berman, 1970
- †Bathytheristes Duffin, 1995
  - †Bathytheristes gracilis Duffin, 1995
- **Bathytoshia** Whitley, 1933
  - †Bathytoshia probsti Cappetta, 1970
- †Bavariscyllium Thies, 2005
  - †Bavariscyllium tischlingeri Thies, 2005
- †Bdellodus Quenstedt, 1882
  - †Bdellodus bollensis Quenstedt, 1882
- †Bealbonn Lund & Grogan, 2004
  - †Bealbonn rogaire Lund & Grogan, 2004
- †Belantsea Lund, 1989
  - †Belantsea montana Lund, 1989
  - †Belantsea occidentalis Anonymous author(s)
- †Belemnobatis Thiollière, 1852
  - †Belemnobatis aominensis Cuny, Srisuk, Kamha, Suteethorn & Tong, 2009
  - †Belemnobatis kermacki Underwood & Ward, 2004
  - †Belemnobatis moorbergensis Thies, 1983
  - †Belemnobatis noviodunumensis Delsate & Candoni, 2001
  - †Belemnobatis sismondae Thiollière, 1852
  - †Belemnobatis stahli Underwood & Ward, 2004
  - †Belemnobatis variabilis Underwood & Rees, 2002
  - †Belemnobatis werneri Thies, 1983
- †Bethacanthus Zangerl, 1990
  - †Bethacanthus insolitus Zangerl, 1990
- †Biropristis Suárez & Cappetta, 2004
  - †Biropristis landbecki Suárez & Cappetta, 2004
- †Bobbodus Zangerl, 1981
  - †Bobbodus schaefferi Zangerl, 1981
  - †Bobbodus xerxesi Hampe, Hairapetian, Dorka, Witzmann, Akbari & Korn, 2013
- †Bohemiacanthus Schneider, 1994
  - †Bohemiacanthus oelbergensis Fritsch, 1890
- †Bolivacanthus Gagnier, Turner, Friman, Suarez-Riglos & Janvier, 1988
  - †Bolivacanthus sagitalis Gagnier, Turner, Friman, Suarez-Riglos & Janvier, 1988
- †Borealotodus Zhelezko, 1999
  - †Borealotodus benyamovski Zhelezko, 1999
  - †Borealotodus borealis Zhelezko, 1999
- †Borodinopristis Case, Schwimmer, Borodin & Leggett, 2001
  - †Borodinopristis ackermani Case, Schwimmer, Borodin & Leggett, 2001
  - †Borodinopristis schwimmeri Case, 1987
  - †Borodinopristis shannoni Case, Cook, Wilson & Borodin, 2012
- **Brachaelurus** Ogilby, 1908
  - †Brachaelurus alvarezi Bernardez, 2002
  - †Brachaelurus hornerstownensis Case, Borodin & Leggett, 2001
  - †Brachaelurus templeuvensis Moreau & Mathis, 2000
- †Brachiacanthus Fritsch, 1889
  - †Brachiacanthus semiplanus Fritsch, 1889
- †Brachycarcharias Cappetta & Nolf, 2005
  - †Brachycarcharias koerti Stromer, 1910
  - †Brachycarcharias lerichei Casier, 1946
  - †Brachycarcharias mississippiensis Case, 1994
- †Brachymylus Woodward, 1892
  - †Brachymylus altidens Woodward, 1892
  - †Brachymylus bogolubovi Averianov, 1992
- †Brachyrhizodus Romer, 1942
  - †Brachyrhizodus mcnultyi Thurmond, 1971
  - †Brachyrhizodus wichitaensis Romer, 1942
- †Bransonella Harlton, 1933
  - †Bransonella lingulata Ivanov & Ginter, 1996
  - †Bransonella nebraskensis Johnson, 1984
  - †Bransonella tribula Elliott & Hodnett, 2013
  - †Bransonella tridentata Harlton, 1933
- †Breviacanthus Phillips, 1871
  - †Breviacanthus brevis Phillips, 1871
- †Britobatos Claeson, Underwood & Ward, 2013
  - †Britobatos primarmata Woodward, 1889
- †Burnhamia Cappetta, 1976
  - †Burnhamia crimensis Udovichenko, 2013
  - †Burnhamia daviesi Woodward, 1889
  - †Burnhamia fetahi Cappetta, 1985
  - †Burnhamia nessovi Udovichenko, 2013
- †Bythiacanthus St. John & Worthen, 1875
  - †Bythiacanthus lopesi Figueroa & Gallo, 2017
  - †Bythiacanthus lucasi Eastman, 1902
  - †Bythiacanthus siderius Leidy, 1870
  - †Bythiacanthus solidus Eastman, 1902

== C ==
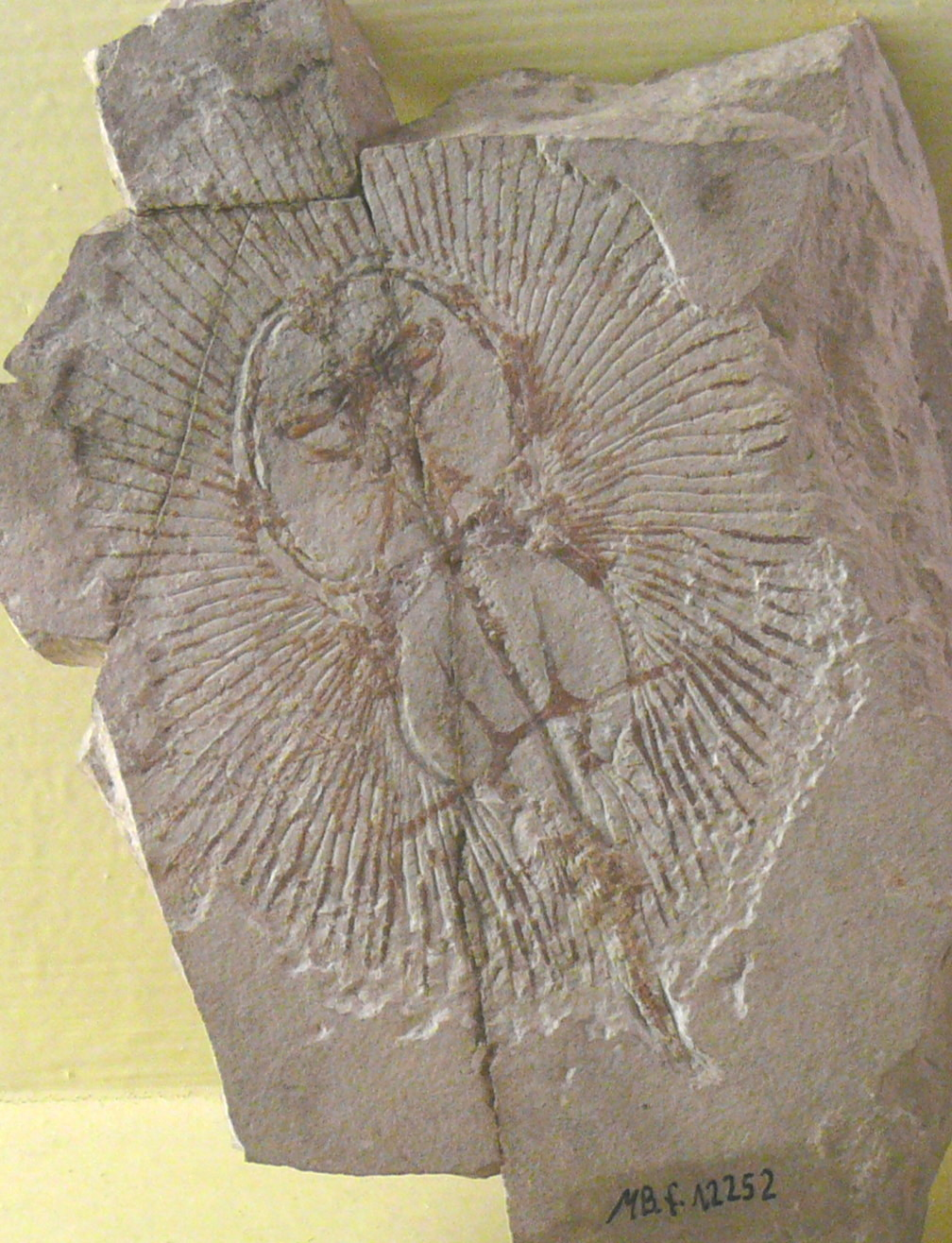
Cyclobatis major

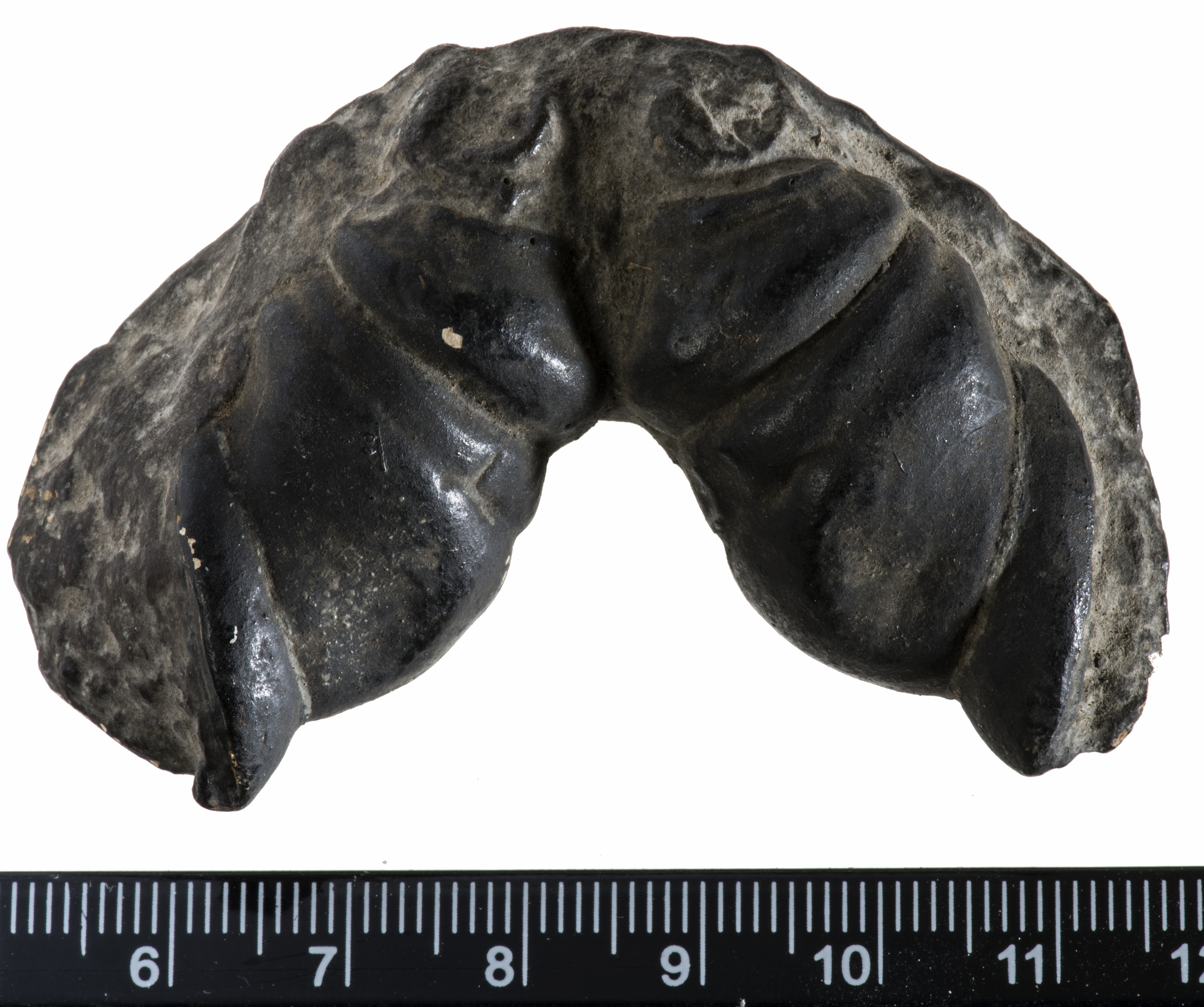
Cochliodus contortus

- †Cadiera Guinot, Cappetta & Adnet, 2014
  - †Cadiera camboensis Guinot, Cappetta & Adnet, 2014
- **Callorhinchus** Lacepède, 1798
  - †Callorhinchus alfordi Cicimurri & Ebersole, 2015
  - †Callorhinchus crassus Woodward & White, 1930
  - †Callorhinchus hectori Newton, 1876
  - †Callorhinchus newtoni Ward, 1973
  - †Callorhinchus phillipsi Cicimurri & Ebersole, 2015
  - †Callorhinchus regulbiensis Gurr, 1963
  - †Callorhinchus rossicus Voronets, 1952
  - †Callorhinchus stahli Kriwet & Gazdzicki, 2003
  - †Callorhinchus torresi Otero, Rubilar-Rogers, Yury-Yanez, Vargas, Gutstein, Mourgues & Robert, 2013
- †Calopodus St. John & Worthen, 1875
  - †Calopodus apicalis St. John & Worthen, 1875
  - †Calopodus zonatus Trautschold, 1879
- †Campodus De Koninck, 1844
  - †Campodus agassizianus De Koninck, 1844
- †Cantioscyllium Woodward, 1889
  - †Cantioscyllium alhaulfi Kriwet, 1999
  - †Cantioscyllium bighornensis Case, 1987
  - †Cantioscyllium brachyplicatum Kriwet, Nunn & Klug, 2009
  - †Cantioscyllium decipiens Woodward, 1889
  - †Cantioscyllium estesi Herman, 1977
  - †Cantioscyllium grandis Cicimurri, Ciampaglio & Runyon, 2014
  - †Cantioscyllium hashimiaensis Mustafa, Case & Zalmout, 2002
  - †Cantioscyllium markaguntensis Kirkland, Eaton & Brinkman, 2013
  - †Cantioscyllium meyeri Case & Cappetta, 1997
  - †Cantioscyllium nessovi Ward & Averianov, 1999
- †Canyonlepis Andreev, Coates, Shelton, Cooper, Smith & Sansom, 2015
  - †Canyonlepis smithae Andreev, Coates, Shelton, Cooper, Smith & Sansom, 2015
- **Carcharhinus** Blainville, 1816
  - †Carcharhinus acanthodon Le Hon, 1871
  - †Carcharhinus ackermannii Silva Santos & Travassos, 1960
  - †Carcharhinus antiquus Agassiz, 1856
  - †Carcharhinus balochensis Adnet, Antoine, Baqri, Crochet, Marivaux, Welcomme & Métais, 2007
  - †Carcharhinus bhubanicus Ralte, Tiwari, Lalchawimawii & Malsawma, 2011
  - †Carcharhinus caquetius Carrillo-Briceño, Maxwell, Aguilera, Sánchez & Sánchez-Villagra, 2015
  - †Carcharhinus carolinensis Leriche, 1942
  - †Carcharhinus cionei Laurito Mora, 1999
  - †Carcharhinus dorsalis Probst, 1878
  - †Carcharhinus egertoni Agassiz, 1843
  - †Carcharhinus elongatus Leriche, 1910
  - †Carcharhinus gibbesii Woodward, 1889
  - †Carcharhinus gilmorei Leriche, 1942
  - †Carcharhinus greyegertoni White, 1956
  - †Carcharhinus jhingrani Mehrotra, Mishra & Srivastava, 1973
  - †Carcharhinus kasserinensis Adnet, Marivaux, Cappetta, Charruault, Essid, Jiquel, Ammar, Marandat, Marzougui, Merzeraud, Temani, Vianey-Liaud & Tabuce, 2020
  - †Carcharhinus magdalenae Jordan & Hannibal, 1923
  - †Carcharhinus malembeensis Dartevelle & Casier, 1943
  - †Carcharhinus perseus Adnet, Antoine, Baqri, Crochet, Marivaux, Welcomme & Métais, 2007
  - †Carcharhinus praejaponicus Yabe, 1949
  - †Carcharhinus priscus Agassiz, 1843
    - †C. p. eastmani Leriche, 1942
    - †C. p. priscus Agassiz, 1843
  - †Carcharhinus robusta Sahni & Mehrotra, 1981
  - †Carcharhinus similis Probst, 1878
  - †Carcharhinus tschoppi Leriche, 1938
  - †Carcharhinus vonderschmitti Leriche, 1938
- **Carcharias** Rafinesque, 1810
  - †Carcharias aasenensis Siverson, 1992
  - †Carcharias acutissimus Agassiz, 1843
  - †Carcharias adneti Vullo, 2005
  - †Carcharias crassidens Agassiz, 1843
  - †Carcharias cuspidatus Agassiz, 1843
  - †Carcharias dominguei Cappetta, Morrison & Adnet, 2019
  - †Carcharias gustrowensis Winkler, 1875
  - †Carcharias hardingi Cappetta & Case, 1975
  - †Carcharias heathi Case & Cappetta, 1997
  - †Carcharias holmdelensis Cappetta & Case, 1975
  - †Carcharias incurvus Davis, 1888
  - †Carcharias latus Davis, 1890
  - †Carcharias lomitae Jordan & Hannibal, 1923
  - †Carcharias samhammeri Cappetta & Case, 1975
  - †Carcharias steineri Case, 1987
  - †Carcharias sternbergensis Reinecke, Moths, Grant & Breitkreuz, 2005
  - †Carcharias striatula Dalinkevicius, 1935
  - †Carcharias tenuis Agassiz, 1843
  - †Carcharias tingitana Arambourg, 1952
  - †Carcharias vorax Le Hon, 1871
- †Carchariolamna Hora, 1939
  - †Carchariolamna heroni Hora, 1939
- †Carcharocles Jordan & Hannibal, 1923
  - †Carcharocles auriculatus Blainville, 1818
  - †Carcharocles subserratus Agassiz, 1843
- **Carcharodon** Smith, 1838
  - †Carcharodon caifassii Lawley, 1876
  - †Carcharodon hubbelli Ehret, Macfadden, Jones, Devries, Foster & Salas-Gismondi, 2012
  - †Carcharodon plicatilis Agassiz, 1843
- †Carcharoides Ameghino, 1901
  - †Carcharoides catticus Philippi, 1846
  - †Carcharoides lipsiensis Reinecke, von der Hocht, Gille & Kindlimann, 2018
  - †Carcharoides tenuidens Chapman, 1913
  - †Carcharoides totuserratus Ameghino, 1901
- †Carcharomodus Kriwet, Mewis & Hampe, 2015
  - †Carcharomodus escheri Agassiz, 1843
- †Carcharopsis Agassiz, 1843
  - †Carcharopsis dentatus McCoy, 1855
  - †Carcharopsis jerofeyewi Romanovsky, 1864
  - †Carcharopsis okensis Romanovsky, 1853
  - †Carcharopsis prototypus Agassiz, 1843
  - †Carcharopsis wortheni Newberry & Worthen, 1866
- †Cardabiodon Siverson, 1999
  - †Cardabiodon ricki Siverson, 1999
  - †Cardabiodon venator Siverson & Lindgren, 2005
- †Carinasubcorona Johns, 1997
  - †Carinasubcorona bamaolinense Chen, 2002
- †Caseodus Zangerl, 1981
  - †Caseodus basalis Cope, 1894
  - †Caseodus eatoni Zangerl, 1981
  - †Caseodus varidentis Mutter & Neumann, 2008
- †Casieria Noubhani & Cappetta, 1997
  - †Casieria casieri Cappetta, 1976
  - †Casieria maghrebiana Noubhani & Cappetta, 1997
- †Cassisodus Ginter & Sun, 2007
  - †Cassisodus margaritae Ginter & Sun, 2007
- †Caucasochasma Prokofiev & Sychevskaya, 2018
  - †Caucasochasma zherikhini Prokofiev & Sychevskaya, 2018
- †Cederstroemia Siverson, 1995
  - †Cederstroemia havreensis Herman, 1977
  - †Cederstroemia nilsi Siverson, 1995
  - †Cederstroemia siverssoni Guinot, Underwood, Cappetta & Ward, 2013
  - †Cederstroemia triangulata Siverson, 1995
  - †Cederstroemia ziaensis Bourdon, Wright, Lucas, Spelmann & Pence, 2011
- †Celtiberina Wang, 1993
  - †Celtiberina maderi Wang, 1993
- †Celtipristis Kriwet, 1999
  - †Celtipristis herreroi Kriwet, 1999
- †Cenocarcharias Cappetta & Case, 1999
  - †Cenocarcharias rochebrunei Sauvage, 1880
  - †Cenocarcharias tenuiplicatus Cappetta & Case, 1975
- †Centrophoroides Davis, 1887
  - †Centrophoroides appendiculatus Agassiz, 1843
  - †Centrophoroides latidens Davis, 1887
- †Centropterus Costa, 1861
  - †Centropterus lividus Costa, 1861
- **Centroscymnus** Barbosa du Bocage & Brito Capello, 1864
  - †Centroscymnus praecursor Müller & Schöllmann, 1989
  - †Centroscymnus schmidi Herman, 1982
- **Centroselachus** Garman, 1913
  - †Centroselachus goordi Mannering & Hiller, 2008
- †Centrosqualus Signeux, 1950
  - †Centrosqualus mustardi Cappetta, Morrison & Adnet, 2019
  - †Centrosqualus primaevus Pictet, 1850
- †Ceolometlaouia Engelbrecht, Mörs, Reguero & Kriwet, 2016
  - †Ceolometlaouia pannucae Engelbrecht, Mörs, Reguero & Kriwet, 2016
- †Cervifurca Zangerl, 1997
  - †Cervifurca nasuta Zangerl, 1997
- **Cetorhinus** Blainville, 1816
  - †Cetorhinus huddlestoni Welton, 2014
  - †Cetorhinus piersoni Welton, 2015
- **Chaenogaleus** Gill, 1862
  - †Chaenogaleus affinis Probst, 1878
- †Changolepis Wang, 1984
  - †Changolepis tricuspidus Wang, 1984
- †Changxingselache Wang, Zhu, Jin & Wang, 2007
  - †Changxingselache wangi Wang, Zhu, Jin & Wang, 2007
- †Chiastodus Trautschold, 1879
  - †Chiastodus obvallatus Trautschold, 1879
- **Chiloscyllium** Müller & Henle, 1837
  - †Chiloscyllium arbizui Bernardez, 2002
  - †Chiloscyllium broennimanni Casier, 1958
  - †Chiloscyllium frequens Guinot, Underwood, Cappetta & Ward, 2013
  - †Chiloscyllium gaemersi Müller, 1989
  - †Chiloscyllium greeni Cappetta, 1973
  - †Chiloscyllium meraense Noubhani & Cappetta, 1997
  - †Chiloscyllium mereretiae Werner, 1989
  - †Chiloscyllium missouriensis Case, 1979
  - †Chiloscyllium salvani Noubhani & Cappetta, 1997
  - †Chiloscyllium vulloi Guinot, Underwood, Cappetta & Ward, 2013
- **Chimaera** Linnaeus, 1758
  - †Chimaera anomala Woodward & White, 1930
  - †Chimaera gosseleti Winkler, 1880
  - †Chimaera seymourensis Ward & Grande, 1991
- †Chimaeropsis Zittel, 1887
  - †Chimaeropsis foussi Casier, 1959
- †Chimaerotheca Brown, 1949
  - †Chimaerotheca aakesi Brown, 1949
  - †Chimaerotheca alaskana Brown, 1946
  - †Chimaerotheca besselsi Brown, 1946
  - †Chimaerotheca farsensis Dashtban, 2005
  - †Chimaerotheca gilli Hay, 1930
  - †Chimaerotheca montanana Brown, 1946
  - †Chimaerotheca newmexicana Brown, 1946
  - †Chimaerotheca reperepe Gottfried & Fordyce, 2014
  - †Chimaerotheca stelcki Warren, 1948
- **Chlamydoselachus** Garman, 1884
  - †Chlamydoselachus balli Cappetta, Morrison & Adnet, 2019
  - †Chlamydoselachus garmani Welton, 1983
  - †Chlamydoselachus gracilis Antunes & Cappetta, 2002
  - †Chlamydoselachus lawleyi Davis, 1887
  - †Chlamydoselachus tobleri Leriche, 1929
- †Chomatodus Agassiz, 1838
  - †Chomatodus affinis Newberry & Worthen, 1866
  - †Chomatodus angulatus Newberry & Worthen, 1866
  - †Chomatodus angustus Newberry, 1879
  - †Chomatodus arcuatus St. John, 1870
  - †Chomatodus chesterensis St. John & Worthen, 1875
  - †Chomatodus comptus St. John & Worthen, 1875
  - †Chomatodus costatus Newberry & Worthen, 1866
  - †Chomatodus cultellus Anonymous author(s)
  - †Chomatodus dentatus Anonymous author(s)
  - †Chomatodus elegans Newberry & Worthen, 1866
  - †Chomatodus gracillimus Newberry & Worthen, 1866
  - †Chomatodus inconstans St. John & Worthen, 1875
  - †Chomatodus incrassatus Anonymous author(s)
  - †Chomatodus insignis Leidy, 1857
  - †Chomatodus lamelliformis Davis, 1884
  - †Chomatodus lanesvillensis Branson, 1906
  - †Chomatodus linearis Agassiz, 1843
  - †Chomatodus loriformis Anonymous author(s)
  - †Chomatodus molaris Newberry & Worthen, 1866
  - †Chomatodus newberryi Anonymous author(s)
  - †Chomatodus parallelus Anonymous author(s)
  - †Chomatodus piasaensis Anonymous author(s)
  - †Chomatodus ponticulus Anonymous author(s)
  - †Chomatodus pusillus Newberry & Worthen, 1866
  - †Chomatodus selliformis Anonymous author(s)
  - †Chomatodus varsouviensis Anonymous author(s)
- †Chondrenchelys Traquair, 1888
  - †Chondrenchelys problematica Traquair, 1888
- †Cladodoides Jaekel, 1921
  - †Cladodoides wildungensis Gross, 1937
- †Cladodus Agassiz, 1843
  - †Cladodus alternatus St. John & Worthen, 1875
  - †Cladodus angulatus Newberry & Worthen, 1866
  - †Cladodus bellifer St. John & Worthen, 1875
  - †Cladodus divaricatus Trautschold, 1874
  - †Cladodus elegans Newberry & Worthen, 1870
  - †Cladodus eriensis Bryant, 1935
  - †Cladodus formosus Hay, 1902
  - †Cladodus marginatus Agassiz, 1843
  - †Cladodus mirabilis Agassiz, 1843
  - †Cladodus pandatus St. John & Worthen, 1875
  - †Cladodus springeri St. John & Worthen, 1875
  - †Cladodus vanhornei St. John & Worthen, 1875
  - †Cladodus yunnanensis Pan, 1964
- †Cladolepis Wells, 1944
  - †Cladolepis gunnelli Wells, 1944
- †Cladoselache Dean, 1894
  - †Cladoselache acanthopterygius Dean, 1909
  - †Cladoselache brachypterygius Dean, 1909
  - †Cladoselache desmopterygius Dean, 1909
  - †Cladoselache fyleri Newberry, 1889
  - †Cladoselache magnificus Claypole, 1894
- †Clairina Ginter, 1999
  - †Clairina marocensis Derycke, 1992
- †Clerolamna Zhelezko, 1999
  - †Clerolamna umovae Zhelezko, 1999
- †Climatius Agassiz, 1845
- †Cobelodus Zangerl, 1973
  - †Cobelodus aculeatus Cope, 1894
- †Cochliodus Agassiz, 1838
  - †Cochliodus leidyi St. John & Worthen, 1883
  - †Cochliodus vanhornii St. John & Worthen, 1883
- †Columbusia Case, Schwimmer, Borodin & Leggett, 2001
  - †Columbusia deblieuxi Kirkland, Eaton & Brinkman, 2013
  - †Columbusia fragilis Case, Schwimmer, Borodin & Leggett, 2001
  - †Columbusia roessingi Case, 1987
- †Columnaodus Cicimurri et al, 2024
  - †Columnaodus witzkei Cicimurri et al, 2024
- †Complanicorona Johns, 1997
  - †Complanicorona rugosimargines Johns, Barnes & Orchard, 1997
- †Contrariodus De Blanger, 2005
  - †Contrariodus wapitiensis De Blanger, 2005
- †Cooleyella Gunnell 1933
  - †Cooleyella cuspidata Gunnell 1933
  - †Cooleyella peculiaris Gunnell 1933
  - †Cooleyella quadrilobata Gunnell 1933
  - †Cooleyella quinqueloba Gunnell 1933
  - †Cooleyella simplex Gunnell 1933
  - †Cooleyella spatulata Gunnell 1933
- †Cooperella Gunnell, 1933
  - †Cooperella typicalis Gunnell, 1933
- †Copodus Davis, 1883
  - †Copodus angulatus Davis, 1883
  - †Copodus cornutus Davis, 1883
  - †Copodus lebedevi Lyapin & Bagirov, 2014
  - †Copodus planus Davis, 1883
  - †Copodus prototypus Davis, 1883
  - †Copodus spatulatus Davis, 1883
- †Coronodus Harris, 1951
  - †Coronodus reimanni Bryant, 1935
- †Corysodon Saint-Seine, 1949
  - †Corysodon cirinensis Saint-Seine, 1949
- †Cosmopolitodus Glikman, 1964
  - †Cosmopolitodus hastalis Agassiz, 1843
- †Coupatezia Cappetta, 1982
  - †Coupatezia ambroggii Noubhani & Cappetta, 1997
  - †Coupatezia boujoi Noubhani & Cappetta, 1997
  - †Coupatezia chariri Noubhani & Cappetta, 1997
  - †Coupatezia cristata Adnet, Marivaux, Cappetta, Charruault, Essid, Jiquel, Ammar, Marandat, Marzougui, Merzeraud, Temani, Vianey-Liaud & Tabuce, 2020
  - †Coupatezia danica Noubhani & Cappetta, 1997
  - †Coupatezia elevata Noubhani & Cappetta, 1997
  - †Coupatezia fallax Arambourg, 1952
  - †Coupatezia laevis Noubhani & Cappetta, 1997
  - †Coupatezia larivei Noubhani & Cappetta, 1997
  - †Coupatezia melittiana Noubhani & Cappetta, 1997
  - †Coupatezia miretrainensis Adnet, 2006
  - †Coupatezia reniformis Noubhani & Cappetta, 1997
  - †Coupatezia trempina Kriwet, Soler-Gijón & López-Martínez, 2007
  - †Coupatezia turneri Case & Cappetta, 1997
  - †Coupatezia woutersi Cappetta, 1982
- †Crassescyliorhinus Underwood & Ward, 2008
  - †Crassescyliorhinus germanicus Herman, 1982
- †Crassodontidanus Kriwet & Klug, 2011
  - †Crassodontidanus serratus Fraas, 1855
  - †Crassodontidanus wiedenrothi Thies, 1983
- †Crassodus Maisch & Matzke, 2016
  - †Crassodus reifi Maisch & Matzke, 2016
- †Cratoselache Woodward, 1924
  - †Cratoselache pruvosti Woodward, 1924
- †Cretacladoides Feichtinger, Engelbrecht, Lukeneder & Kriwet, 2018
  - †Cretacladoides noricum Feichtinger, Engelbrecht, Lukeneder & Kriwet, 2018
  - †Cretacladoides ogiveformis Feichtinger, Engelbrecht, Lukeneder & Kriwet, 2018
- †Cretalamna Glikman, 1958
  - †Cretalamna appendiculata Agassiz, 1843
  - †Cretalamna aschersoni Stromer, 1905
  - †Cretalamna biauriculata Wanner, 1902
  - †Cretalamna borealis Priem, 1897
  - †Cretalamna bryanti Ebersole & Ehret, 2018
  - †Cretalamna catoxodon Siverson, Lindgren, Newbrey, Cederström & Cook, 2015
  - †Cretalamna deschutteri Siverson, Lindgren, Newbrey, Cederström & Cook, 2015
  - †Cretalamna ewelli Siverson, Lindgren, Newbrey, Cederström & Cook, 2015
  - †Cretalamna gertericorum Siverson, Lindgren, Newbrey, Cederström & Cook, 2015
  - †Cretalamna hattini Siverson, Lindgren, Newbrey, Cederström & Cook, 2015
  - †Cretalamna lata Herman, 1977
  - †Cretalamna maroccana Arambourg, 1935
  - †Cretalamna pachyrhyza Herman, 1977
  - †Cretalamna sarcoportheta Siverson, Lindgren, Newbrey, Cederström & Cook, 2015
- †Cretaplatyrhinoidis Guinot, Cappetta, Underwood & Ward, 2012
  - †Cretaplatyrhinoidis ornatus Guinot, Cappetta, Underwood & Ward, 2012
- †Cretascyliorhinus Underwood & Mitchell, 1999
  - †Cretascyliorhinus cappettai Bernardez, 2002
  - †Cretascyliorhinus destombesi Cappetta, 1977
- †Cretascymnus Cappetta, 1980
  - †Cretascymnus adonis Signeux, 1950
  - †Cretascymnus quimbalaensis Antunes & Cappetta, 2002
  - †Cretascymnus westfalicus Müller & Schöllmann, 1989
- †Cretodus Sokolov, 1965
  - †Cretodus crassidens Dixon, 1850
  - †Cretodus longiplicatus Werner, 1989
  - †Cretodus semiplicatus Münster, 1843
  - †Cretodus sulcatus Geinitz, 1843
- †Cretomanta Case, Tokaryk & Baird, 1990
  - †Cretomanta canadensis Case, Tokaryk & Baird, 1990
- †Cretorectolobus Case, 1978
  - †Cretorectolobus doylei Underwood, Mitchell & Veltkamp, 1999
  - †Cretorectolobus gracilis Underwood & Mitchell, 1999
  - †Cretorectolobus olsoni Case, 1978
  - †Cretorectolobus robustus Underwood & Cumbaa, 2010
- †Cretoxyrhina Glikman, 1958
  - †Cretoxyrhina agassizensis Underwood & Cumbaa, 2010
  - †Cretoxyrhina mantelli Agassiz, 1843
  - †Cretoxyrhina vraconensis Zhelezko, 2000
- †Cristabatis Delsate & Candoni, 2001
  - †Cristabatis crescentiformis Delsate & Candoni, 2001
  - †Cristabatis exundans Delsate & Candoni, 2001
- †Cristatodens Ginter & Sun, 2007
  - †Cristatodens sigmoidalis Ginter & Sun, 2007
- †Cristomylus Kirkland, Eaton & Brinkman, 2013
  - †Cristomylus bulldogensis Kirkland, Eaton & Brinkman, 2013
  - †Cristomylus cifellii Kirkland, Eaton & Brinkman, 2013
  - †Cristomylus nelsoni Kirkland, Eaton & Brinkman, 2013
- †Cromhallia Behan, Walken & Cuny, 2012
  - †Cromhallia parvunda Behan, Walken & Cuny, 2012
- †Crookallia Chabakov, 1949
  - †Crookallia czernyshevi Chabakov, 1927
- †Ctenacanthus Agassiz, 1837
  - †Ctenacanthus amblyxiphias Cope, 1891
  - †Ctenacanthus buttersi St. John & Worthen, 1883
  - †Ctenacanthus chemungensis Claypole, 1885
  - †Ctenacanthus cliftonensis Branson & Mehl, 1938
  - †Ctenacanthus concinnus Newberry, 1875
  - †Ctenacanthus elegans Tuomey, 1858
  - †Ctenacanthus furcicarinatus Newberry, 1875
  - †Ctenacanthus major Agassiz, 1843
  - †Ctenacanthus maranhensis Santos, 1946
  - †Ctenacanthus nodocostatus Hussakof & Bryant, 1918
  - †Ctenacanthus terrelli Newberry, 1889
  - †Ctenacanthus tumidus Newberry, 1889
- †Ctenopristis Arambourg, 1940
  - †Ctenopristis jordanicus Mustafa, Case & Zalmout, 2002
  - †Ctenopristis nougareti Arambourg, 1940
- †Ctenoptychius Agassiz, 1838
  - †Ctenoptychius apicalis Agassiz, 1843
- †Cyclobatis Egerton, 1844
  - †Cyclobatis major Davis, 1887
  - †Cyclobatis oligodactylus Egerton, 1844
  - †Cyclobatis tuberculatus Cappetta, 1980
- †Cynopodius Traquair, 1881
  - †Cynopodius crenulatus Traquair, 1881
- †Cyrtonodus Davis, 1884
  - †Cyrtonodus hornei Woodward, 1889

== D ==
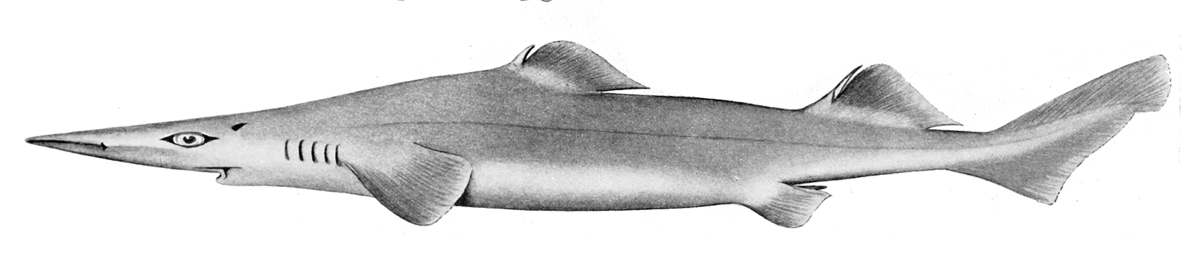
A modern Deania sp.

- †Dabasacanthus Zangerl, 1979
  - †Dabasacanthus inskasi Zangerl, 1979
- **Dalatias** Rafinesque, 1810
  - †Dalatias crenulatus Arambourg, 1952
  - †Dalatias sparophagus Rafinesque, 1810
  - †Dalatias turkmenicus Glikman, 1964
- †Dallasiella Cappetta & Case, 1999
  - †Dallasiella willistoni Cappetta & Case, 1999
- †Dalmehodus Long & Hairapetian, 2000
  - †Dalmehodus turnerae Long & Hairapetian, 2000
- †Dalpiazia Checchia-Rispoli, 1933
  - †Dalpiazia stromeri Checchia-Rispoli, 1933
- †Damocles Lund, 1986
  - †Damocles serratus Lund, 1986
- †Danogaleus Noubhani & Cappetta, 1997
  - †Danogaleus gueriri Noubhani & Cappetta, 1997
- **Dasyatis** Rafinesque, 1810
  - †Dasyatis africana Arambourg, 1947
    - D. a. akajei Müller & Henle, 1841
    - †D. a. rikuzenensis Hatai, Murata & Masuda, 1965
  - †Dasyatis alveolata Leriche, 1942
  - †Dasyatis borodini Case, 1981
  - †Dasyatis branisai Cappetta, 1975
  - †Dasyatis carasuensis Averianov & Udovitshenko, 1993
  - †Dasyatis carolinensis Emmons, 1858
  - †Dasyatis charlisae Case, 1981
  - †Dasyatis commercensis Case & Cappetta, 1997
  - †Dasyatis concavifoveus Cvancara & Hoganson, 1993
  - †Dasyatis crosswickense Case, 1996
  - †Dasyatis datasi Noubhani & Cappetta, 1997
  - †Dasyatis davisi Casier, 1966
  - †Dasyatis delfortriei Cappetta, 1970
  - †Dasyatis dianapizarroae Laurito Mora, 1999
  - †Dasyatis dux Cope, 1867
  - †Dasyatis hexagonalis Arambourg, 1952
  - †Dasyatis jaekeli Leriche, 1905
  - †Dasyatis mahuliensis Sahni & Mehrotra, 1981
  - †Dasyatis martini Noubhani & Cappetta, 1997
  - †Dasyatis masudae Hatai & Kotaka, 1962
  - †Dasyatis minuta Cappetta, 1970
  - †Dasyatis molinoensis Cappetta, 1975
  - †Dasyatis newegyptensis Case, Borodin & Leggett, 2001
  - †Dasyatis nipponensis Hatai & Kotaka, 1962
  - †Dasyatis ponsi Noubhani & Cappetta, 1997
  - †Dasyatis puercensis Williamson & Lucas, 1993
  - †Dasyatis radians Marsh, 1877
  - †Dasyatis rafinesquei Kumar & Loyal, 1987
  - †Dasyatis rugosa Probst, 1877
  - †Dasyatis russelli Cappetta, 1972
  - †Dasyatis schaefferi Cappetta, 1975
  - †Dasyatis serralheiroi Cappetta, 1970
  - †Dasyatis sessaoensis Cappetta, 1972
  - †Dasyatis speetonensis Underwood, Mitchell & Veltkamp, 1999
  - †Dasyatis strangulata Probst, 1877
  - †Dasyatis tetraedra Arambourg, 1952
  - †Dasyatis thierryi Smith, 1999
  - †Dasyatis tochtabusiensis Averianov & Udovitshenko, 1993
  - †Dasyatis torrejonius Williamson & Lucas, 1993
  - †Dasyatis tricuspidatus Casier, 1946
  - †Dasyatis vicaryi Loyal, 1984
  - †Dasyatis wochadunensis Ward, 1979
- †Dasyrhombodus Noubhani & Cappetta, 1994
  - †Dasyrhombodus bondoni Arambourg, 1952
- †Davodus Hansen, 1985
  - †Davodus tripartitis Davis, 1883
- **Deania** Jordan & Snyder, 1902
  - †Deania angoumeensis Adnet, 2006
  - †Deania radicans Probst, 1879
- †Debeerius Grogan & Lund, 2000
  - †Debeerius ellefseni Grogan & Lund, 2000
- †Deihim Ginter, Hairapetian & Klug, 2002
  - †Deihim mansureae Ginter, Hairapetian & Klug, 2002
- †Delpitia Noubhani & Cappetta, 1997
  - †Delpitia reticulata Noubhani & Cappetta, 1997
- †Delpitoscyllium Noubhani & Cappetta, 1997
  - †Delpitoscyllium africanum Leriche, 1927
  - †Delpitoscyllium planum Davis, 1890
- †Deltodus Morris & Roberts, 1862
  - †Deltodus angularis Newberry & Worthen, 1866
  - †Deltodus concha Trautschold, 1874
  - †Deltodus gibbus Woodward, 1889
  - †Deltodus occidentalis Leidy, 1857
  - †Deltodus robustus De Koninck, 1878
  - †Deltodus rugosus Woodward, 1889
  - †Deltodus tubineus Richards, Sherwin, Smithson, Bennion, Davies, Marshall & Clack, 2018
  - †Deltodus undulatus Newberry & Worthen, 1866
- †Deltoptychius Morris & Roberts, 1862
  - †Deltoptychius acutus Agassiz, 1843
- †Denaea Pruvost, 1922
  - †Denaea decora Ivanov, 1999
  - †Denaea fournieri Pruvost, 1922
  - †Denaea saltsmani Ginter & Hansen, 2010
  - †Denaea wangi Wang, Jin & Wang, 2004
  - †Denaea williamsi Ginter & Hansen, 2010
- †Dendrodus Whiteaves, 1897
  - †Dendrodus arisaigensis Whiteaves, 1897
- †Desmiodus St. John & Worthen, 1875
  - †Desmiodus costelliferus St. John & Worthen, 1875
  - †Desmiodus tumidus St. John & Worthen, 1875
- †Diablodontus Hodnett, Elliott & Olson, 2013
  - †Diablodontus michaeledmundi Hodnett, Elliott & Olson, 2013
- †Diabodus Cuny, Ouaja, Srarfi, Schmitz, Buffetaut & Benton, 2004
  - †Diabodus tataouinensis Cuny, Ouaja, Srarfi, Schmitz, Buffetaut & Benton, 2004
- †Diademodus Harris, 1951
  - †Diademodus dominicus Roelofs, Playton, Barham & Trinajstic, 2015
  - †Diademodus utahensis Ginter, 2008
- †Dicentrodus Traquair, 1888
  - †Dicentrodus bicuspidatus Traquair, 1881
- †Diclitodus Davis, 1883
  - †Diclitodus denshumani Newberry & Worthen, 1866
  - †Diclitodus scitulus Davis, 1883
- †Diplacodus Davis, 1884
  - †Diplacodus bulboides Davis, 1884
- †Diplodoselache Dick, 1981
  - †Diplodoselache antiqua Lebedev, 1996
  - †Diplodoselache parvulus Traquair, 1881
  - †Diplodoselache woodi Dick, 1981
- †Diplodus Agassiz, 1843
  - †Diplodus acinaces Dawson, 1860
- †Diplolonchidion Heckert, 2004
  - †Diplolonchidion murryi Heckert, 2004
- **Dipturus** Rafinesque, 1810
  - †Dipturus casieri Steurbaut & Herman, 1978
- †Distobatus Werner, 1989
  - †Distobatus nutiae Werner, 1989
- †Doliobatis Delsate & Candoni, 2001
  - †Doliobatis weisi Delsate & Candoni, 2001
- †Doliodus Traquair, 1893
  - †Doliodus latispinosus Whiteaves, 1881
  - †Doliodus problematicus Woodward, 1892
- †Doratodus Schmid, 1861
  - †Doratodus tricuspidatus Schmid, 1861
- †Dorsetoscyllium Underwood & Ward, 2004
  - †Dorsetoscyllium terraefullonicum Underwood & Ward, 2004
- †Duffinodus Popov, 2003
  - †Duffinodus nikolaii Popov, 2003
- †Duffinselache Andreev & Cuny, 2012
  - †Duffinselache holwellensis Duffin, 1998
- †Duwibatis Cappetta, 1991
  - †Duwibatis problematica Cappetta, 1991
- †Dwardius Siverson, 1999
  - †Dwardius siversoni Zhelezko, 2000
  - †Dwardius sudindicus Underwood, Goswami, Prasad, Verma & Flynn, 2011
  - †Dwardius woodwardi Herman, 1977
- †Dwykaselachus Oelofsen, 1986
  - †Dwykaselachus oosthuizeni Oelofsen, 1986
- †Dykeius Cappetta, Morrison & Adnet, 2019
  - †Dykeius garethi Cappetta, Morrison & Adnet, 2019

== E ==
- †Echinochimaera Lund, 1977
  - †Echinochimaera meltoni Lund, 1977
- **Echinorhinus** Blainville, 1816
  - †Echinorhinus australis Chapman, 1909
  - †Echinorhinus blakei Agassiz, 1856
  - †Echinorhinus caspius Glikman, 1964
  - †Echinorhinus eyrensis Pledge, 1992
  - †Echinorhinus kelleyi Pfeil, 1983
  - †Echinorhinus lapaoi Antunes & Cappetta, 2002
  - †Echinorhinus maremagnum Bogan, Agnolin, Otero, Brissón Egli, Suárez, Soto-Acuña & Novas, 2017
  - †Echinorhinus pfauntschi Pfeil, 1983
  - †Echinorhinus pollerspoecki Pfeil, 1983
  - †Echinorhinus pozzii Ameghino, 1906
  - †Echinorhinus priscus Arambourg, 1952
  - †Echinorhinus richiardii Lawley, 1876
  - †Echinorhinus schoenfeldi Pfeil, 1983
  - †Echinorhinus vielhus Guinot, Cappetta & Adnet, 2014
  - †Echinorhinus wadanohanaensis Kitamura, 2013
  - †Echinorhinus weltoni Pfeil, 1983
- †Edaphodon Buckland, 1838
  - †Edaphodon agassizii Buckland, 1835
  - †Edaphodon arambourgi Dartevelle & Casier, 1959
  - †Edaphodon barberi Applegate, 1970
  - †Edaphodon bucklandi Agassiz, 1843
  - †Edaphodon eolucifer Popov & Yarkov, 2001
  - †Edaphodon eyrensis Long, 1985
  - †Edaphodon hesperis Shin, 2010
  - †Edaphodon kawai Consoli, 2006
  - †Edaphodon mantelli Buckland, 1835
  - †Edaphodon mirabilis Chapman & Cudmore, 1924
  - †Edaphodon mirificus Leidy, 1856
  - †Edaphodon pliocenicus Carraroli, 1897
  - †Edaphodon snowhillensis Gouiric-Cavalli, Cabrera, Cione, O'Gorman, Coria & Fernández, 2015
  - †Edaphodon sweeti Chapman & Pritchard, 1907
- †Edestus Leidy, 1855
  - †Edestus crenulatus Hay, 1909
  - †Edestus giganteus Newberry, 1888
  - †Edestus heinrichi Newberry & Worthen, 1870
  - †Edestus karpinskyi Missuna, 1908
  - †Edestus kolomnensis Lebedev, 2001
  - †Edestus minor Newberry & Worthen, 1866
  - †Edestus minusculus Hay, 1909
  - †Edestus mirus Hay, 1912
  - †Edestus newtoni Woodward, 1917
  - †Edestus protopirata Trautschold, 1879
  - †Edestus serratus Hay, 1909
  - †Edestus triserratus Newton, 1904
  - †Edestus vorax Leidy, 1855
- †Egertonodus Maisey, 1987
  - †Egertonodus basanus Egerton, 1844
  - †Egertonodus duffini Rees & Underwood, 2008
- †Elasmodectes Woodward, 1888
  - †Elasmodectes avitus Von Meyer, 1862
  - †Elasmodectes willetti Newton, 1878
  - †Elasmodectes zangerli Stahl & Chatterjee, 1999
- †Elasmodus Egerton, 1843
  - †Elasmodus avirostris Anonymous author(s)
  - †Elasmodus cheganicus Anonymous author(s)
  - †Elasmodus greenoughi Anonymous author(s)
  - †Elasmodus hunteri Egerton, 1843
  - †Elasmodus kempi Ward, 1977
  - †Elasmodus khosatskyi Anonymous author(s)
  - †Elasmodus rossicus Averianov, 1999
  - †Elasmodus sinzovi Anonymous author(s)
  - †Elasmodus zharyk Anonymous author(s)
- †Emerikodus Trinajstic & George, 2009
  - †Emerikodus ektrapelus Trinajstic & George, 2009
- †Emsolepis Turner, 2004
  - †Emsolepis hanspeteri Turner, 2004
- †Enantiobatis Cappetta & Case, 1999
  - †Enantiobatis tarrantensis Cappetta & Case, 1999
- †Engaibatis Arratia, Kriwet & Heinrich, 2002
  - †Engaibatis schultzei Arratia, Kriwet & Heinrich, 2002
- †Engolismaia Vullo, Cappetta & Néraudeau, 2007
  - †Engolismaia couillardi Vullo, Cappetta & Néraudeau, 2007
- †Enniskillen Whitley, 1951
  - †Enniskillen convexus Davis, 1883
- †Eodalatias Engelbrecht et al., 2017
  - †Eodalatias austrinalis Engelbrecht et al., 2017
- †Eoetmopterus Müller & Schöllmann, 1989
  - †Eoetmopterus supracretaceus Müller & Schöllmann, 1989
- †Eogaleus Cappetta, 1975
  - †Eogaleus bolcensis Cappetta, 1975
- †Eomanodon Ward & Duffin, 1989
  - †Eomanodon simmsi Ward & Duffin, 1989
- †Eomanta Pfeil, 1981
  - †Eomanta kowaldi Pfeil, 1981
- †Eometlaouia Noubhani & Cappetta, 2002
  - †Eometlaouia numidica Arambourg, 1952
- †Eomobula Herman, Hovestadt-Euler & Hovestadt, 1989
  - †Eomobula stehmanni Herman, Hovestadt-Euler & Hovestadt, 1989
- †Eoplatyrhina Marramà, Carnevale, Claeson, Naylor & Kriwet, 2020
  - †Eoplatyrhina bolcensis Heckel, 1851
- †Eoplinthicus Cappetta & Stringer, 2002
  - †Eoplinthicus underwoodi Adnet, Cappetta, Guinot & Notarbartolo Di Sciara, 2012
  - †Eoplinthicus yazooensis Cappetta & Stringer, 2002
- †Eoptolamna Kriwet, Klug, Canudo & Cuenca-Bescos, 2008
  - †Eoptolamna eccentrolopha Kriwet, Klug, Canudo & Cuenca-Bescos, 2008
  - †Eoptolamna supracretacea Guinot, Underwood, Cappetta & Ward, 2013
- †Eorhincodon Li, 1995
  - †Eorhincodon tianshanensis Li, 1995
- †Eorhinobatos Marramà, Carnevale, Naylor, Varese, Giusberti & Kriwet, 2020
  - †Eorhinobatos primaevus De Zigno, 1874
- †Eorhinoptera Case, Cook & Wilson, 2011
  - †Eorhinoptera grabdai Case, Cook & Wilson, 2011
- †Eoscymnus Herman & Van Den Eeckhaut, 2010
  - †Eoscymnus anthonisi Herman & Van Den Eeckhaut, 2010
- †Eosqualiolus Adnet, 2006
  - †Eosqualiolus aturensis Adnet, 2006
  - †Eosqualiolus skrovinai Underwood & Schlogl, 2013
- †Eostegostoma Herman, 1977
  - †Eostegostoma angustum Nolf & Taverne, 1977
- †Eostriatolamia Glikman, 1980
  - †Eostriatolamia aktobensis Zhelezko, 1987
  - †Eostriatolamia lerichei Glikman & Zhelezko, 1977
  - †Eostriatolamia paucicorrugata Underwood & Cumbaa, 2010
  - †Eostriatolamia segedini Glikman & Zhelezko, 1977
  - †Eostriatolamia subulata Agassiz, 1843
  - †Eostriatolamia venusta Leriche, 1906
- †Eotorpedo White, 1934
  - †Eotorpedo hilgendorfi Jaekel, 1904
  - †Eotorpedo jaekeli White, 1934
  - †Eotorpedo nolfi Herman, 1974
  - †Eotorpedo zennaroi Cappetta, 1988
- †Eoxyphodolamia Glikman, 1980
  - †Eoxyphodolamia mangislakensis Glikman, 1980
- †Erquitaia Cappetta, 1989
  - †Erquitaia arganiae Arambourg, 1952
  - †Erquitaia misrensis Cappetta, 1991
- †Erikodus Nielsen, 1952
  - †Erikodus groenlandensis Nielsen, 1952
- †Ertychius Ginter, Hairapetian & Grigoryan, 2011
  - †Ertychius intermedius Ginter, Hairapetian & Grigoryan, 2011
- †Erythrobatis Cappetta, 1991
  - †Erythrobatis cuspidata Cappetta, 1991
- **Etmopterus** Rafinesque, 1810
  - †Etmopterus acutidens Casier, 1966
  - †Etmopterus cahuzaci Adnet, 2006
- †Eugenodus Zangerl, 1981
  - †Eugenodus richardsoni Zangerl, 1981
- †Euglossodus White & Moy-Thomas, 1940
  - †Euglossodus fastigiatus Anonymous author(s)
  - †Euglossodus linguabovis McCoy, 1848
- †Eunemacanthus St. John & Worthen, 1875
  - †Eunemacanthus costatus Newberry & Worthen, 1866

== F ==
- †Fadenia Nielsen, 1932
  - †Fadenia crenulata Nielsen, 1932
  - †Fadenia gigas Eaton, 1962
  - †Fadenia monscana Trautschold, 1874
  - †Fadenia uroclasmato Mutter & Neumann, 2008
- †Falcatus Lund, 1985
  - †Falcatus falcatus St. John & Worthen, 1875
- †Fayolia Renault & Zeiller, 1884
  - †Fayolia ellipticus Anonymous author(s)
  - †Fayolia ornata Goldenberg, 1875
  - †Fayolia palatina Weiss, 1884
  - †Fayolia sharovi Fischer, Voigt, Schneider, Buchwitz & Voigt, 2011
  - †Fayolia warei Crookall, 1928
- †Fissodopsis Lund, Grogan & Fath, 2014
  - †Fissodopsis robustus Lund, Grogan & Fath, 2014
- †Fissodus St. John & Worthen, 1875
  - †Fissodus bifidus St. John & Worthen, 1875
  - †Fissodus inaequalis St. John & Worthen, 1875
  - †Fissodus pattoni Etheridge, 1877
  - †Fissodus tricuspidatus St. John & Worthen, 1875
- †Florenceodon Cappetta, Morrison & Adnet, 2019
  - †Florenceodon johnyi Cappetta, Morrison & Adnet, 2019
- †Folipistrix Kriwet, 2003
  - †Folipistrix digitulus Kriwet, 2003
- †Fornicatus Fuchs, Engelbrecht, Lukeneder & Kriwet, 2018
  - †Fornicatus austriacus Fuchs, Engelbrecht, Lukeneder & Kriwet, 2018
- †Foumtizia Noubhani & Cappetta, 1997
  - †Foumtizia abdouni Noubhani & Cappetta, 1997
  - †Foumtizia arba Noubhani & Cappetta, 1997
  - †Foumtizia deschutteri Herman & Van Den Eeckhaut, 2010
  - †Foumtizia gadaensis Noubhani & Cappetta, 1997
  - †Foumtizia pattersoni Cappetta, 1976
  - †Foumtizia poudenxae Adnet, 2006
  - †Foumtizia zhelezkoi Malyshkina, 2006
- †Fragilicorona Johns, 1997
  - †Fragilicorona asymmetriia Ji, Ji & Feng, 2009
  - †Fragilicorona guizhouensi Ji, Ji & Feng, 2009
  - †Fragilicorona labritricuspis Johns, Barnes & Orchard, 1997
  - †Fragilicorona paralabritricuspis Chen, 2002
  - †Fragilicorona wanlantricuspis Zhang, Chen, Cheng & Zhang, 2012
- †Frangerodus Rees & Underwood, 2008
  - †Frangerodus lingualis Woodward, 1889

== G ==
- †Galagadon Gates, Gorscak & Makovicky, 2019
  - †Galagadon nordquistae Gates, Gorscak & Makovicky, 2019
- **Galeocerdo** Müller & Henle, 1837
  - †Galeocerdo acutus Storms, 1894
  - †Galeocerdo aduncus Agassiz, 1843
  - †Galeocerdo aegyptiacus Stromer, 1905
  - †Galeocerdo alabamensis Leriche, 1942
  - †Galeocerdo angustidens Probst, 1878
  - †Galeocerdo capellini Lawley, 1876
  - †Galeocerdo casei Müller, 1999
  - †Galeocerdo clarkensis White, 1956
  - †Galeocerdo davisi Chapman & Pritchard, 1904
  - †Galeocerdo eaglesomei White, 1955
  - †Galeocerdo gajensis Tewari, Chaturvedi & Singh, 1960
  - †Galeocerdo latidens Agassiz, 1843
  - †Galeocerdo mayumbensis Dartevelle & Casier, 1943
  - †Galeocerdo mixtus Ameghino, 1901
  - †Galeocerdo paulinoi Silva Santos & Travassos, 1960
  - †Galeocerdo productus Agassiz, 1856
  - †Galeocerdo rosaliaensis Applegate, 1978
  - †Galeocerdo subcrenatus Emmons, 1858
  - †Galeocerdo sublaevis Münster, 1842
  - †Galeocerdo triqueter Eastman, 1904
- †Galeocorax Cappetta, 2012
  - †Galeocorax jaekeli Woodward, 1895
  - †Galeocorax unilateralis Averianov, 1997
- **Galeorhinus** Blainville, 1816
  - †Galeorhinus duchaussoisi Adnet & Cappetta, 2008
  - †Galeorhinus girardoti Herman, 1977
  - †Galeorhinus glickmani Popov & Lapkin, 2000
  - †Galeorhinus goncalvesi Antunes, Balbino & Cappetta, 1999
  - †Galeorhinus loangoensis Dartevelle & Casier, 1943
  - †Galeorhinus louisi Adnet & Cappetta, 2008
  - †Galeorhinus mesetaensis Noubhani & Cappetta, 1997
  - †Galeorhinus minutissimus Arambourg, 1935
  - †Galeorhinus parvulus Dartevelle & Casier, 1943
  - †Galeorhinus tenuis Averianov & Udovitshenko, 1993
  - †Galeorhinus ypresiensis Casier, 1946
- †Ganntouria Noubhani & Cappetta, 1997
  - †Ganntouria variabilis Noubhani & Cappetta, 1997
- †Ganopristis Arambourg, 1935
  - †Ganopristis leptodon Arambourg, 1935
- †Gansuselache Wang, Zhang, Zhu & Zhao, 2009
  - †Gansuselache tungshengi Wang, Zhang, Zhu & Zhao, 2009
- †Garabatis Cappetta, 1993
  - †Garabatis atlasi Cappetta, 1993
- †Garrigascyllium Guinot, Cappetta & Adnet, 2014
  - †Garrigascyllium aganticensis Guinot, Cappetta & Adnet, 2014
- †Gibbechinorhinus Cappetta, 1990
  - †Gibbechinorhinus lewyi Cappetta, 1990
- †Gilliodus Zangerl, 1981
  - †Gilliodus orvillei Zangerl, 1981
  - †Gilliodus peyeri Zangerl, 1981
- **Ginglymostoma** Müller & Henle, 1837
  - †Ginglymostoma angolense Dartevelle & Casier, 1943
  - †Ginglymostoma botmaense Noubhani & Cappetta, 1997
  - †Ginglymostoma chenanei Noubhani & Cappetta, 1997
  - †Ginglymostoma cuspidata Case, Borodin & Leggett, 2001
  - †Ginglymostoma dartevellei Casier, 1946
  - †Ginglymostoma delfortriei Daimeries, 1889
  - †Ginglymostoma erramii Noubhani & Cappetta, 1997
  - †Ginglymostoma khouribgaense Noubhani & Cappetta, 1997
  - †Ginglymostoma maghrebianum Casier, 1947
  - †Ginglymostoma malembeense Dartevelle & Casier, 1943
  - †Ginglymostoma maroccanum Noubhani & Cappetta, 1997
  - †Ginglymostoma serra Leidy, 1877
  - †Ginglymostoma sokotoense White, 1934
  - †Ginglymostoma subafricanum Arambourg, 1952
- †Ginteria Duffin & Ivanov 2008
  - †Ginteria fungiforma Duffin & Ivanov 2008
- †Gissarodus Ivanov, 2013
  - †Gissarodus flabellatus Ivanov, 2013
- †Glabrisubcorona Johns, 1997
  - †Glabrisubcorona triridgecorona Zhang, Chen, Cheng & Zhang, 2012
- †Gladbachus Heidtke & Krätschmer, 2001
  - †Gladbachus adentatus Heidtke & Krätschmer, 2001
- †Gladioserratus Underwood, Goswami, Prasad, Verma & Flynn, 2011
  - †Gladioserratus aptiensis Pictet, 1864
  - †Gladioserratus dentatus Guinot, Cappetta & Adnet, 2014
  - †Gladioserratus magnus Underwood, Goswami, Prasad, Verma & Flynn, 2011
  - †Gladioserratus serratissimus Agassiz, 1843
- †Glencartius Ginter & Skompski, 2019
  - †Glencartius costellatus Traquair, 1884
- †Glickmanodus Nessov, Mertiniene & Averianov, 1997
  - †Glickmanodus rarus Nessov, Mertiniene & Averianov, 1997
- †Glikmania Case, Udovitshenko, Nessov, Averianov & Borodin, 1996
  - †Glikmania tamdyensa Case, Udovitshenko, Nessov, Averianov & Borodin, 1996
- †Glikmanius Ginter, Ivanov & Lebedev, 2005
  - †Glikmanius culmenis Koot, Cuny, Tintori & Twitchett, 2013
  - †Glikmanius myachkovensis Lebedev, 2001
  - †Glikmanius occidentalis Leidy, 1859
- †Glueckmanotodus Zhelezko, 1999
  - †Glueckmanotodus heinzelini Casier, 1967
    - †G. h. cheganensis Zhelezko, 1999
    - †G. h. heinzelini Casier, 1967
  - †Glueckmanotodus kamyshinensis Zhelezko, 1999
  - †Glueckmanotodus karatauensis Zhelezko, 1999
- †Glykmania Averianov & Udovitshenko, 1993
  - †Glykmania turkestanensis Averianov & Udovitshenko, 1993
- †Glyphanodus Davis, 1883
  - †Glyphanodus tenuis Davis, 1883
- **Glyphis** Agassiz, 1843
  - †Glyphis hastalis Agassiz, 1843
  - †Glyphis pagoda Noetling, 1901
- †Gogoselachus Long, Burrow, Ginter, Maisey, Trinajstic, Coates, Young & Senden, 2015
  - †Gogoselachus lynbeazleyae Long, Burrow, Ginter, Maisey, Trinajstic, Coates, Young & Senden, 2015
- †Gomphogaleus Adnet & Cappetta, 2008
  - †Gomphogaleus rodgersi Case, 1994
- †Gondwanodus Daymond, 1999
  - †Gondwanodus irwinensis Daymond, 1999
- †Goodrichthys Moy-Thomas, 1951
  - †Goodrichthys eskdalensis Moy-Thomas, 1936
- †Gregorius Lund & Grogan, 2004
  - †Gregorius rexi Lund & Grogan, 2004
- †Grozonodon Cuny, Martin, Mazin & Rauscher, 1998
  - †Grozonodon candaui Cuny, Martin, Mazin & Rauscher, 1998
- †Gualepis Wang, 1984
  - †Gualepis elegans Wang, 1984
- †Gunnellodus Wilimovsky, 1954
  - †Gunnellodus bellistriatus Gunnell, 1933
- **Gymnura** van Hasselt, 1823
  - †Gymnura delpiti Cappetta, 1984
  - †Gymnura grootaerti Herman, 1984
  - †Gymnura hovestadti Herman, 1984
  - †Gymnura laterialata Werner, 1989
  - †Gymnura transita Averianov & Udovitshenko, 1993
- †Gyrace Jordan & Hannibal, 1923
  - †Gyrace occidentalis Agassiz, 1856

== H ==
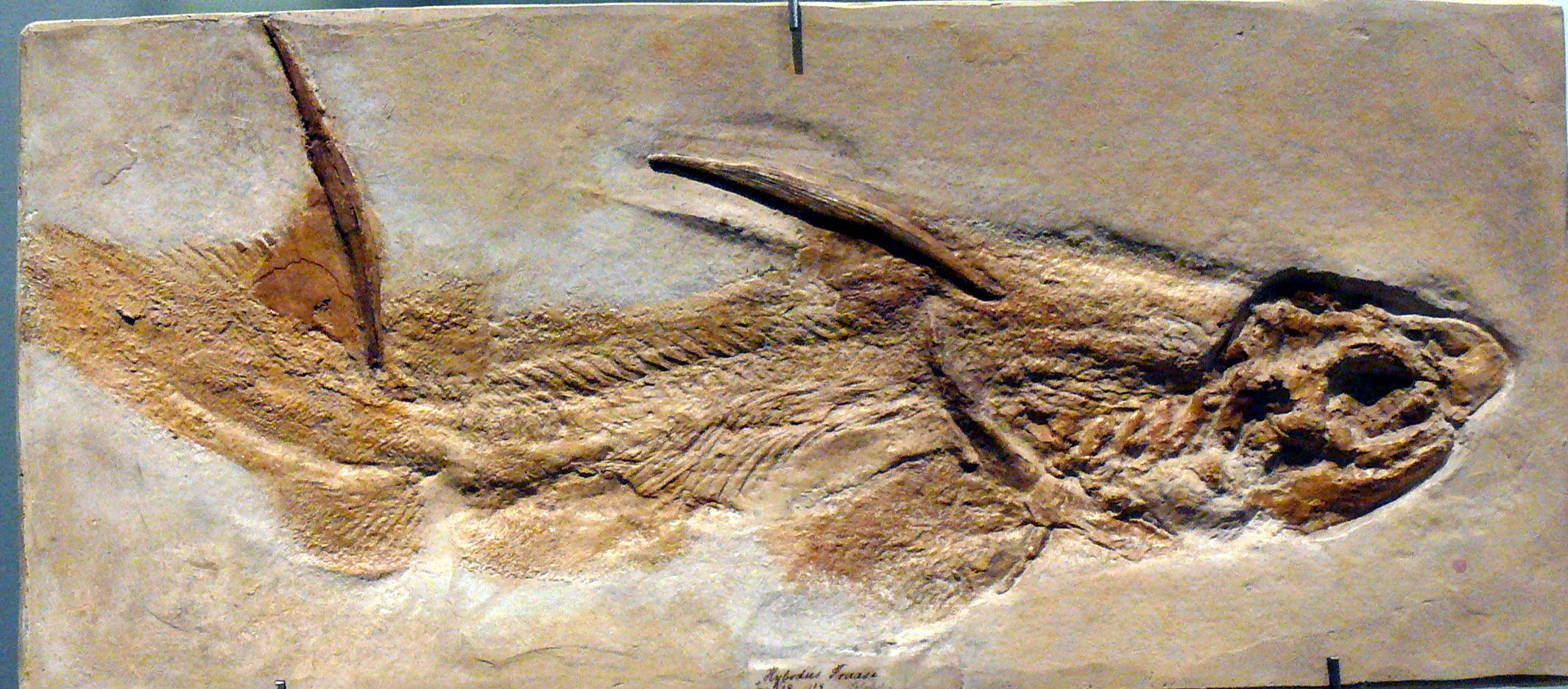
Hybodus fraasi

- †Hagenoselache Hampe & Heidtke, 1997
  - †Hagenoselache sippeli Hampe & Heidtke, 1997
- †Haimirichia Vullo, Guinot & Barbe, 2016
  - †Haimirichia amonensis Cappetta & Case, 1975
- †Halonodon Duffin, 1984
  - †Halonodon warneri Duffin, 1984
- †Hamiltonichthys Maisey, 1989
  - †Hamiltonichthys mapesi Maisey, 1989
- †Hamrabatis Cappetta, 1991
  - †Hamrabatis bernardezi Vullo, Cappetta & Néraudeau, 2007
  - †Hamrabatis garcialcaldei Bernardez, 2002
  - †Hamrabatis ornata Cappetta, 1991
  - †Hamrabatis sanchezi Bernardez, 2002
  - †Hamrabatis weltoni Case & Cappetta, 1997
- †Hamulospina Lebedev, 2001
  - †Hamulospina lyapini Lebedev, 2001
  - †Hamulospina morozovi Lebedev, 2001
- †Harpacanthus Traquair, 1886
  - †Harpacanthus fimbriatus Stock, 1883
- †Harpacodus Davis, 1881
  - †Harpacodus clavatus Davis, 1881
  - †Harpacodus dentatus Owen, 1840
  - †Harpacodus limatulus St. John & Worthen, 1875
- †Harpagofututor Lund, 1982
  - †Harpagofututor volsellorhinus Lund, 1982
- †Harranahynchus Kaddumi, 2009
  - †Harranahynchus minutadens Kaddumi, 2009
- **Harriotta** Goode & Bean, 1895
  - †Harriotta lehmani Werdelin, 1986
- †Helicampodus Branson, 1935
  - †Helicampodus changhsiangensis Liu & Chang, 1963
  - †Helicampodus ealoni Obruchev, 1965
  - †Helicampodus kokeni Branson, 1935
  - †Helicampodus qomolangma Zhang, 1976
- †Helicoprion Karpinsky, 1899
  - †Helicoprion bessonowi Karpinsky, 1899
  - †Helicoprion davisi Woodward, 1886
  - †Helicoprion ergassaminon Bendix-Almgreen, 1966
  - †Helicoprion ferrieri Hay, 1907
  - †Helicoprion jingmenense Chen, Cheng & Yin, 2007
  - †Helicoprion karpinskii Obruchev, 1953
- †Heliobatis Marsh, 1877
  - †Heliobatis radians Marsh, 1877
- †Helodus Agassiz, 1838
  - †Helodus coniculus Newberry & Worthen, 1866
  - †Helodus crenulatis Newberry & Worthen, 1866
  - †Helodus simplex Agassiz, 1843
- **Hemipristis** Agassiz, 1843
  - †Hemipristis curvatus Dames, 1883
  - †Hemipristis serra Agassiz, 1843
  - †Hemipristis unidenticulata Ralte, Tiwari, Lalchawimawii & Malsawma, 2011
- **Hemiscyllium** Müller & Henle, 1838
  - †Hemiscyllium bruxelliensis Herman, 1977
  - †Hemiscyllium hermani Müller, 1989
  - †Hemiscyllium tailledisensis Adnet, 2006
- **Heptranchias** Rafinesque, 1810
  - †Heptranchias ezoensis Applegate & Uyeno, 1968
  - †Heptranchias howellii Reed, 1946
  - †Heptranchias karagalensis Kozlov, 1999
  - †Heptranchias tenuidens Leriche, 1938
- †Hercynolepis Gross, 1973
  - †Hercynolepis meischneri Gross, 1973
- †Hermanobatos Bernardez, 2002
  - †Hermanobatos mendezi Bernardez, 2002
- †Hermanodus Landemaine, 1991
  - †Hermanodus dolloi Leriche, 1911
- †Heslerodus Ginter, 2002
  - †Heslerodus divergens Trautschold, 1879
- †Hessinodon Cappetta, Morrison & Adnet, 2019
  - †Hessinodon wardi Cappetta, Morrison & Adnet, 2019
- †Heterobatis Noubhani & Cappetta, 1997
  - †Heterobatis talbaouii Noubhani & Cappetta, 1997
- †Heterodontobatis Landemaine 1991
  - †Heterodontobatis paucicarinata Landemaine 1991
- **Heterodontus** Blainville, 1816
  - †Heterodontus agassizi (Reuss 1846)
  - †Heterodontus cainozoicus Chapman & Pritchard, 1904
  - †Heterodontus canaliculatus (Egerton ex Dixon 1850)
  - †Heterodontus carerens Kriwet, 1999
  - †Heterodontus creamridgensis Case, Borodin & Leggett, 2001
  - †Heterodontus danicus (Rosenkrantz, 1920)
  - †Heterodontus duffini Thies, 1983
  - †Heterodontus elongatus Case & Borodin, 2000
  - †Heterodontus granti Case & Cappetta, 1997
  - †Heterodontus havreensis Herman, 1977
  - †Heterodontus janefirdae Case, 1980
  - †Heterodontus laevis Guinot, Underwood, Cappetta & Ward, 2013
  - †Heterodontus lerichei Casier, 1943
  - †Heterodontus lonzeensis Herman, 1977
  - †Heterodontus maisierensis Herman, 1977
  - †Heterodontus paucicarinatus (Landemaine, 1991)
  - †Heterodontus pineti Case, 1981
  - †Heterodontus polonicus Rees, 2005
  - †Heterodontus rugosus (Agassiz, 1839)
  - †Heterodontus sowasheense Case, 1994
  - †Heterodontus sulcatus Woodward, 1889
  - †Heterodontus tuberculatus Maisey, 1982
  - †Heterodontus upnikensis Dalinkevicius, 1935
  - †Heterodontus uscariensis Laurito Mora, 1999
  - †Heterodontus vincenti Leriche, 1905
  - †Heterodontus wardenensis Casier, 1966
  - †Heterodontus woodwardi Casier, 1946
  - †Heterodontus zitteli Eastman, 1911
- †Heteropetalus Lund, 1977
  - †Heteropetalus elegantulus Lund, 1977
- †Heterophorcynus Underwood & Ward, 2004
  - †Heterophorcynus microdon Underwood & Ward, 2004
- †Heteroptychodus Yabe & Obata, 1930
  - †Heteroptychodus kokutensis Cuny, Laojumpon, Cheychiw & Lauprasert, 2010
  - †Heteroptychodus steinmanni Yabe & Obata, 1930
- †Heterotorpedo Ward, 1983
  - †Heterotorpedo brahimi Noubhani & Cappetta, 1997
  - †Heterotorpedo fowleri Ward, 1983
  - †Heterotorpedo lyazidii Noubhani & Cappetta, 1997
- **Hexanchus** Rafinesque, 1810
  - †Hexanchus agassizi Cappetta, 1976
  - †Hexanchus andersoni Jordan, 1907
  - †Hexanchus casieri Kozlov, 1999
  - †Hexanchus collinsonae Ward, 1979
  - †Hexanchus gracilis Davis, 1887
  - †Hexanchus hookeri Ward, 1979
  - †Hexanchus microdon Agassiz, 1843
  - †Hexanchus tusbairicus Kozlov, 1999
- **Hexatrygon** Heemstra & Smith, 1980
  - †Hexatrygon senegasi Adnet, 2006
- **Himantura** Müller & Henle, 1837
  - †Himantura souarfortuna Adnet, Marivaux, Cappetta, Charruault, Essid, Jiquel, Ammar, Marandat, Marzougui, Merzeraud, Temani, Vianey-Liaud & Tabuce, 2020
- †Hispidaspis Sokolov, 1978
  - †Hispidaspis bestobensis Zhelezko & Kozlov, 2000
  - †Hispidaspis cantabrigensis Zhelezko, 2000
  - †Hispidaspis gigas Woodward, 1889
  - †Hispidaspis horridus Sokolov, 1978
  - †Hispidaspis lasuri Zhelezko, 2000
  - †Hispidaspis mangyshlakensis Zhelezko, 2000
  - †Hispidaspis priscus Sokolov, 1978
  - †Hispidaspis turkestanensis Zhelezko, 2000
- †Holmesella Gunnell, 1931
  - †Holmesella quadrata Gunnell, 1931
- †Hologinglymostoma Noubhani & Cappetta, 1997
  - †Hologinglymostoma jaegeri Noubhani & Cappetta, 1997
- †Hopleacanthus Schaumberg, 1982
  - †Hopleacanthus richelsdorfensis Schaumberg, 1982
- †Hubeiodus Shang, Cuny & Chen, 2008
  - †Hubeiodus ziguiensis Shang, Cuny & Chen, 2008
- †Hueneichthys Reif, 1977
  - †Hueneichthys costatus Reif, 1977
- †Hunanohelicoprion Liu, 1994
  - †Hunanohelicoprion xiandongensis Liu, 1994
- †Hybodus Agassiz, 1837
  - †Hybodus acutus Agassiz, 1843
  - †Hybodus aequitridentatus Cuny, Suttethorn, Kamha & Buffetaut, 2008
  - †Hybodus antingensis Liu, 1962
  - †Hybodus apicalis Agassiz, 1843
  - †Hybodus brabanticus Leriche, 1930
  - †Hybodus bronnii Reuss, 1846
  - †Hybodus bugarensis Pla, Márquez-Aliaga & Botella, 2013
  - †Hybodus carinatus Eichwald, 1871
  - †Hybodus clarkensis Cragin, 1894
  - †Hybodus clavus Xing-Xu, 1980
  - †Hybodus cloacinus Quenstedt, 1858
  - †Hybodus complanatus Owen, 1869
  - †Hybodus crassispinus Agassiz, 1843
  - †Hybodus crassus Agassiz, 1843
  - †Hybodus cristatus Reuss, 1845
  - †Hybodus cuspidatus Agassiz, 1843
  - †Hybodus dawni Martill, 1989
  - †Hybodus delabechei Charlesworth, 1839
  - †Hybodus dewalquei Forir, 1887
  - †Hybodus dorsalis Agassiz, 1843
  - †Hybodus dubius Agassiz, 1843
  - †Hybodus ensatus Agassiz, 1843
  - †Hybodus fittoni Dunker, 1846
  - †Hybodus florencei Moraes Regi, 1960
  - †Hybodus formosus Agassiz, 1843
  - †Hybodus fraasi Brown, 1900
  - †Hybodus furcatostriatus Martin, 1874
  - †Hybodus hauffianus Fraas, 1896
  - †Hybodus heberti Terquem & Piette, 1865
  - †Hybodus hodzhakulensis Nessov & Mertiniene, 1985
  - †Hybodus houtienensis Young, 1941
  - †Hybodus huangnidanensis Wang, 1977
  - †Hybodus inflatus Agassiz, 1843
  - †Hybodus kansaiensis Nessov & Mertiniene, 1985
  - †Hybodus karagaсhkaensis Minich, 1985
  - †Hybodus keuperianus Winkler, 1880
  - †Hybodus leptodus Agassiz, 1843
  - †Hybodus leviusculus Agassiz, 1843
  - †Hybodus lusitanicus Kriwet, 2004
  - †Hybodus marginalis Agassiz, 1843
  - †Hybodus medius Agassiz, 1843
  - †Hybodus molimbaensis Casier, 1961
  - †Hybodus monoprion Quenstedt, 1858
  - †Hybodus multiconus Jaekel, 1889
  - †Hybodus multiplicatus Jaekel, 1889
  - †Hybodus nevadensis Wemple, 1906
  - †Hybodus nukusensis Nessov & Mertiniene, 1985
  - †Hybodus obtusus Agassiz, 1843
  - †Hybodus personati Quenstedt, 1858
  - †Hybodus pleiodus Agassiz, 1843
  - †Hybodus polyprion Agassiz, 1843
  - †Hybodus polyptychus Reuss, 1846
  - †Hybodus pusillus Dunker, 1846
  - †Hybodus pyramidalis Agassiz, 1843
  - †Hybodus radix Giebel, 1848
  - †Hybodus raricostatus Agassiz, 1843
  - †Hybodus reticulatus Agassiz, 1837
  - †Hybodus shastensis Wemple, 1906
  - †Hybodus songaensis Saint-Seine & Casier, 1962
  - †Hybodus spasskiensis Minich, 1985
  - †Hybodus striatulus Agassiz, 1843
  - †Hybodus strictus Agassiz, 1843
  - †Hybodus subcarinatus Agassiz, 1843
  - †Hybodus sulcatus Agassiz, 1843
  - †Hybodus undulatus Agassiz, 1843
  - †Hybodus woodwardi Vidal, 1915
  - †Hybodus wyomingensis Case, 1987
  - †Hybodus yohi Yang, Wang & Hao, 1984
  - †Hybodus youngi Liu, 1962
  - †Hybodus zuodengensis Yang, Wang & Hao, 1984
- †Hylaeobatis Woodward, 1916
  - †Hylaeobatis problematica Woodward, 1916
- †Hypolophites Stromer, 1910
  - †Hypolophites hutchinsi Case, 1996
  - †Hypolophites mayombensis Leriche, 1913
  - †Hypolophites myliobatoides Stromer, 1910
  - †Hypolophites thaleri Cappetta, 1972
- †Hypolophodon Cappetta, 1980
  - †Hypolophodon dockeryi Case, 1994
  - †Hypolophodon patagoniensis Cione, Tejedor & Goin, 2013
  - †Hypolophodon sylvestris White, 1931
- †Hypotodus Jaekel, 1895
  - †Hypotodus verticalis Agassiz, 1843
- †Hypsobatis Cappetta, 1992
  - †Hypsobatis weileri Cappetta, 1992

== I ==
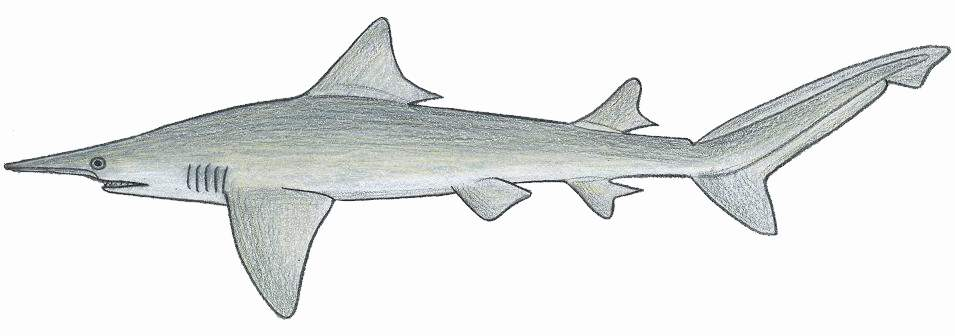
A modern Isogomphodon sp.

- **Iago** Compagno & Springer, 1971
  - †Iago angustidens Cappetta, 1973
  - †Iago carlaluisai Leder, 2013
- †Iansan Brito & Séret, 1996
  - †Iansan beurleni Santos, 1968
- †Iberotrygon Kriwet, Nunn & Klug, 2009
  - †Iberotrygon plagiolophus Kriwet, Nunn & Klug, 2009
- †Igdabatis Cappetta, 1972
  - †Igdabatis indicus Prasad & Cappetta, 1993
  - †Igdabatis marmii Blanco, 2018
  - †Igdabatis sigmodon Cappetta, 1972
- †Ikamauius Keyes, 1979
  - †Ikamauius ensifer Davis, 1888
- †Iniopera Zangerl & Case, 1973
  - †Iniopera richardsoni Zangerl & Case, 1973
- †Iniopteryx Zangerl & Case, 1973
  - †Iniopteryx rushlaui Zangerl & Case, 1973
  - †Iniopteryx tedwhitei Zangerl & Case, 1973
- †Inioxyele Zangerl & Case, 1973
  - †Inioxyele whitei Zangerl & Case, 1973
- †Isacrodus Ivanov, Nestell & Nestell, 2012
  - †Isacrodus marthae Ivanov, Nestell & Nestell, 2012
- †Isanodus Cuny, Suttethorn, Kamha, Buffetaut & Philippe, 2006
  - †Isanodus nongbualamphuensis Khamha, Cuny & Lauprasert, 2016
  - †Isanodus paladeji Cuny, Suttethorn, Kamha, Buffetaut & Philippe, 2006
- †Ischyodus Egerton, 1843
  - †Ischyodus beaumonti Egerton, 1843
  - †Ischyodus bifurcatus Case, 1978
  - †Ischyodus curvidens Egerton, 1843
  - †Ischyodus dolloi Leriche, 1902
  - †Ischyodus mortoni Chapman & Pritchard, 1907
  - †Ischyodus obruchevi Averianov, 1992
  - †Ischyodus planus Newton, 1878
  - †Ischyodus quenstedti Wagner, 1857
  - †Ischyodus rayhaasi Hoganson & Erickson, 2005
  - †Ischyodus schuebleri Quenstedt, 1858
  - †Ischyodus tessoni Buckland, 1843
  - †Ischyodus williamsae Case, 1991
- †Ischyrhiza Leidy, 1856
  - †Ischyrhiza basinensis Case, 1987
  - †Ischyrhiza chilensis Philippi, 1887
  - †Ischyrhiza georgiensis Case, Schwimmer, Borodin & Leggett, 2001
  - †Ischyrhiza hartenbergeri Cappetta, 1975
  - †Ischyrhiza mira Leidy, 1856
  - †Ischyrhiza monasterica Case & Cappetta, 1997
  - †Ischyrhiza radiata Clark, 1895
  - †Ischyrhiza schneideri Slaughter & Schneider, 1968
  - †Ischyrhiza serra Nessov, 1997
  - †Ischyrhiza viaudi Cappetta, 1981
- †Ishaquia Noubhani & Cappetta, 1995
  - †Ishaquia globidens Arambourg, 1952
- **Isistius** Gill, 1865
  - †Isistius triangulus Probst, 1879
  - †Isistius trituratus Winkler, 1876
- **Isogomphodon** Gill, 1862
  - †Isogomphodon acuarius Probst, 1879
  - †Isogomphodon caunellensis Cappetta, 1970
- †Isurolamna Cappetta, 1976
  - †Isurolamna affinis Casier, 1946
  - †Isurolamna bajarunasi Glikman & Zhelezko, 1985
  - †Isurolamna gracilis Le Hon, 1871
  - †Isurolamna inflata Leriche, 1905
- **Isurus** Rafinesque, 1810
  - †Isurus desori Agassiz, 1843
  - †Isurus flandricus Leriche, 1910
  - †Isurus minutus Agassiz, 1843
  - †Isurus nakaminatoensis Saito, 1961
  - †Isurus planus Agassiz, 1856
  - †Isurus praecursor Leriche, 1905
  - †Isurus rameshi Mehrotra, Mishra & Srivastava, 1973
- †Itapyrodus Silva Santos, 1990
  - †Itapyrodus punctatus Silva Santos, 1990
- †Ixobatis Noubhani & Cappetta, 1995
  - †Ixobatis mucronata Arambourg, 1952

== J ==
- †Jacquhermania Cappetta, 1982
  - †Jacquhermania duponti Winkler, 1876
- †Jaekelotodus Menner, 1928
  - †Jaekelotodus bagualensis Otero, Oyarzún, Soto-Acuña, Yury-Yáñez, Gutierrez, Le Roux, Torres & Hervé, 2013
  - †Jaekelotodus borystenicus Glikman, 1964
  - †Jaekelotodus jaekeli Zhelezko, 1994
  - †Jaekelotodus karagiensis Glikman, 1964
  - †Jaekelotodus londonensis Zhelezko, 1994
  - †Jaekelotodus minor Glikman, 1964
  - †Jaekelotodus robustus Leriche, 1921
  - †Jaekelotodus trigonalis Jaekel, 1895
    - †J. t. bucharensis Zhelezko, 1999
    - †J. t. medius Glikman, 1964
    - †J. t. trigonalis Jaekel, 1895
- †Jalodus Ginter, 1999
  - †Jalodus australiensis Long, 1990
- †Janassa Münster, 1839
  - †Janassa angularis Branson, 1916
  - †Janassa bituminosa Schlotheim, 1832
  - †Janassa brevis Newberry, 1856
  - †Janassa clarki Lund, 1989
  - †Janassa clavata McCoy, 1855
  - †Janassa emydinus Cope, 1883
  - †Janassa imbricata McCoy, 1848
  - †Janassa kochi Nielsen, 1932
  - †Janassa korni Weigelt, 1930
  - †Janassa linguaeformis Atthey, 1868
  - †Janassa maxima Eastman, 1903
  - †Janassa oblongus Newberry & Worthen, 1870
  - †Janassa strigilina Cope, 1881
  - †Janassa unguicula Eastman, 1903
- †Jiaodontus Klug, Tütken, Wings, Pfretzschner & Martin, 2010
  - †Jiaodontus montaltissimus Klug, Tütken, Wings, Pfretzschner & Martin, 2010
  - †Jiaodontus vedenemus Klug, Tütken, Wings, Pfretzschner & Martin, 2010
- †Jimpohlia Zangerl, 1979
  - †Jimpohlia erinacea Zangerl, 1979
- †Johnlongia Siverson, 1996
  - †Johnlongia allocotodon Siverson, 1996
  - †Johnlongia parvidens Cappetta, 1973
- †Jurobatos Thies, 1983
  - †Jurobatos cappettai Thies, 1983

== K ==
- †Kaibabvenator Hodnett, Elliott, Olso & Wittke, 2012
  - †Kaibabvenator swiftae Hodnett, Elliott, Olso & Wittke, 2012
- †Kallodentis Engelbrecht, Mörs, Reguero & Kriwet, 2017
  - †Kallodentis rhytistemma Engelbrecht, Mörs, Reguero & Kriwet, 2017
- †Kannathalepis Märss & Gagnier, 2001
  - †Kannathalepis milleri Märss & Gagnier, 2001
- †Kanodus Lebedev, 2014
  - †Kanodus robustus Lebedev, 2014
- †Karaisurus Kozlov, 1999
  - †Karaisurus demidkini Kozlov, 1999
- †Karksilepis Märss, Kleesment & Niit, 2008
  - †Karksilepis parva Märss, Kleesment & Niit, 2008
- †Karksiodus Ivanov & Märss, 2011
  - †Karksiodus mirus Ivanov & Märss, 2011
- †Kathemacanthus Gagnier & Wilson, 1996
  - †Kathemacanthus rosulentus Gagnier & Wilson, 1996
- †Kawichthys Pradel, Tafforeau, Maisey & Janvier, 2011
  - †Kawichthys moodiei Pradel, Tafforeau, Maisey & Janvier, 2011
- †Keasius Welton, 2013
  - †Keasius parvus Leriche, 1908
  - †Keasius rhenanus Reinecke, Von Der Hocht & Dufraing, 2015
  - †Keasius septemtrionalis Reinecke, Von Der Hocht & Dufraing, 2015
  - †Keasius taylori Welton, 2013
- †Kenolamna Siverson, Lindgren, Newbrey, Cederström & Cook, 2015
  - †Kenolamna gunsoni Siverson, 1996
- †Keuperodus Ivanov, Duffin & Richter, 2021
  - †Keuperodus brodiei Woodward, 1893
- †Khoratodus Cuny, Suteethorn, Kamha & Buffetaut, 2008
  - †Khoratodus foreyi Cuny, Suteethorn, Kamha & Buffetaut, 2008
- †Khouribgaleus Noubhani & Cappetta, 1997
  - †Khouribgaleus gomphorhiza Arambourg, 1952
- †Khuffia Koot, Cuny, Tintori & Twitchett, 2013
  - †Khuffia lenis Koot, Cuny, Tintori & Twitchett, 2013
  - †Khuffia prolixa Koot, Cuny, Tintori & Twitchett, 2013
- †Kiestus Cappetta & Case, 1999
  - †Kiestus texana Cappetta & Case, 1975
- †Kimmerobatis Underwood & Claeson, 2018
  - †Kimmerobatis etchesi Underwood & Claeson, 2018
- †Knerialepis Karatajute-Talimaa, 1997
  - †Knerialepis mashkovae Hanke & Karatajute-Talimaa, 2002
- †Komoksodon Cappetta, Morrison & Adnet, 2019
  - †Komoksodon kwutchakuth Cappetta, Morrison & Adnet, 2019
- †Kruckowlamna Laurito Mora, 1999
  - †Kruckowlamna costarricana Laurito Mora, 1999
- †Kungurodus Ivanov, 2017
  - †Kungurodus obliquus (Ivanov, 2005)

== L ==
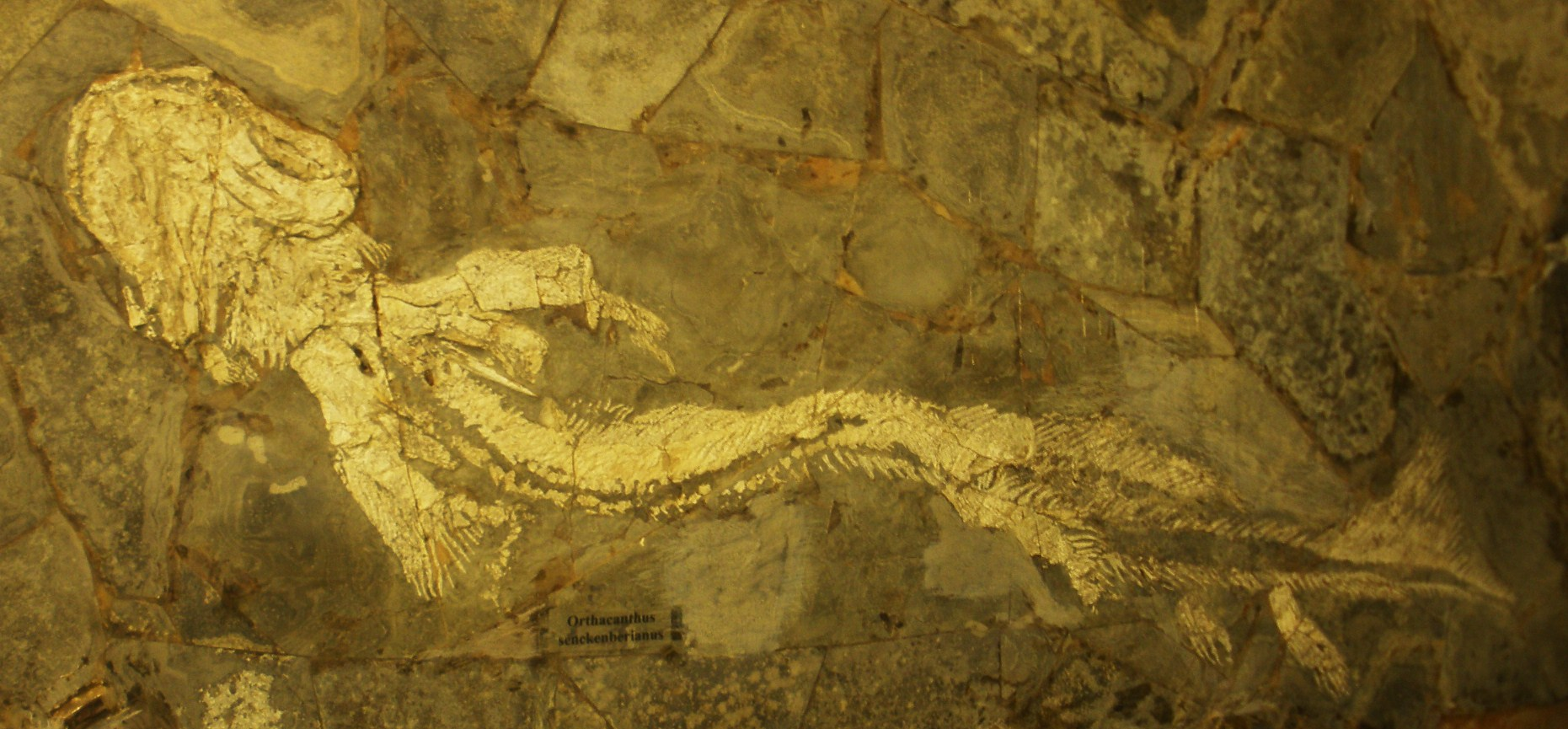
Lebachacanthus senckenbergianus

- †Labrilancea Johns, 1997
  - †Labrilancea glabrisubcuspis Johns, Barnes & Orchard, 1997
- †Lagarodus Jaekel, 1898
  - †Lagarodus angustus Romanovsky, 1864
  - †Lagarodus specularis Trautschold, 1874
- †Lamarodus Ivanov, Nestell, Nestell & Bell, 2019
  - †Lamarodus triangulus Ivanov, Nestell, Nestell & Bell, 2019
- †Lamiostoma Glikman, 1964
  - †Lamiostoma belyaevi Glikman, 1964
  - †Lamiostoma stolarovi Glikman & Zhelezko, 1999
- **Lamna** Cuvier, 1816
  - †Lamna attenuata Davis, 1888
  - †Lamna carinata Davis, 1888
  - †Lamna hectori Davis, 1888
  - †Lamna marginalis Davis, 1888
  - †Lamna quinquelateralis Cragin, 1894
  - †Lamna trigeri Coquand, 1860
  - †Lamna trigonata Agassiz, 1843
- †Lebachacanthus Soler-Gijón, 1997
  - †Lebachacanthus colosseus Heidtke, 2007
  - †Lebachacanthus pollichiae Heidtke, 2007
  - †Lebachacanthus senckenbergianus Fritsch, 1889
- †Lebediodon Nessov & Averianov, 1996
  - †Lebediodon oskolensis Nessov & Averianov, 1996
- †Leidybatis Cappetta, 1986
  - †Leidybatis granulosus Cappetta, 1986
  - †Leidybatis jugosus Leidy, 1876
  - †Leidybatis rusticus Mendiola, 1999
  - †Leidybatis zemensis Mendiola, 1999
- †Leiodus St. John & Worthen, 1875
  - †Leiodus calcaratus St. John & Worthen, 1875
- †Leiribatos Kriwet, 2004
  - †Leiribatos alienus Kriwet, 2004
- †Leonodus Mader, 1986
  - †Leonodus carlsi Mader, 1986
- †Leptacanthus Agassiz, 1837
  - †Leptacanthus cornaliae Bellotti, 1858
  - †Leptacanthus tenuispinus Agassiz, 1843
- **Leptocharias** Smith, 1838
  - †Leptocharias cretaceus Underwood & Ward, 2008
  - †Leptocharias tunisiensis Adnet, Marivaux, Cappetta, Charruault, Essid, Jiquel, Ammar, Marandat, Marzougui, Merzeraud, Temani, Vianey-Liaud & Tabuce, 2020
- †Leptostyrax Williston, 1900
  - †Leptostyrax macrorhiza Cope, 1875
  - †Leptostyrax stychi Schmitz, Thies & Kriwet, 2010
- †Lesnilomia Ginter, 2008
  - †Lesnilomia sandbergi Ginter, 2008
- †Lethenia Baut & Genault, 1999
  - †Lethenia vandenbroecki Winkler, 1880
- †Libanopristis Cappetta, 1980
  - †Libanopristis hiram Hay, 1903
- †Lisgodus St. John & Worthen, 1875
  - †Lisgodus affinis Newberry, 1879
  - †Lisgodus curtus St. John & Worthen, 1875
  - †Lisgodus selluliformis St. John & Worthen, 1875
  - †Lisgodus serratus St. John & Worthen, 1875
- †Lissodus Brough, 1935
  - †Lissodus africanus Broom, 1909
  - †Lissodus angulatus Stensiö, 1921
  - †Lissodus anitae Thurmond, 1971
  - †Lissodus aquilus Minikh, 2001
  - †Lissodus breve Patterson, 1966
  - †Lissodus brousclaudiae Derycke-Khatir, 2005
  - †Lissodus cassangensis Teixeira, 1956
  - †Lissodus crenulatus Patterson, 1966
  - †Lissodus cristatus Delsate & Duffin, 1999
  - †Lissodus curvidens Duffin & Thies, 1997
  - †Lissodus delsatei Guennegues & Biddle, 1989
  - †Lissodus duffini Prasad, Singh, Parmar, Goswami & Sudan, 2008
  - †Lissodus grewingki Dalinkevicius, 1935
  - †Lissodus griffisi Case, 1987
  - †Lissodus guenneguesi Delsate, 2003
  - †Lissodus hasleensis Rees, 1998
  - †Lissodus humblei Murry, 1981
  - †Lissodus indicus Yadagiri, 1986
  - †Lissodus johnsonorum Milner & Kirkland, 2006
  - †Lissodus khamari Derycke-Khatir, 2005
  - †Lissodus lacustris Gebhardt, 1988
  - †Lissodus leiodus Woodward, 1887
  - †Lissodus lepagei Duffin, 1993
  - †Lissodus levis Woodward, 1887
  - †Lissodus lopezae Soler-Gijón, 1997
  - †Lissodus lusavorichi Ginter, Hairapetian & Grigoryan, 2011
  - †Lissodus microselachos Estes & Sanchiz, 1982
  - †Lissodus minimus Agassiz, 1843
  - †Lissodus montsechi Gomez Pallerola, 1979
  - †Lissodus multicuspidatus Duffin & Thies, 1997
  - †Lissodus nitidus Woodward, 1888
  - †Lissodus nodosus Seilacher, 1948
  - †Lissodus noncostatus Duffin & Thies, 1997
  - †Lissodus pattersoni Duffin, 1985
  - †Lissodus pustulatus Patterson, 1966
  - †Lissodus sardiniensis Fischer, Schneider & Ronchi, 2010
  - †Lissodus selachos Estes, 1964
  - †Lissodus striatus Patterson, 1966
  - †Lissodus subhercynicus Dorka, 2001
  - †Lissodus triaktis Minich, 1995
  - †Lissodus tursusae Derycke-Khatir, 2005
  - †Lissodus wardi Duffin, 1985
  - †Lissodus weltoni Duffin, 1985
  - †Lissodus xiushuiensis Wang, Zhu, Jin & Wang, 2007
  - †Lissodus zideki Johnson, 1981
- †Listracanthus Newberry & Worthen, 1870
  - †Listracanthus eliasi Hibbard, 1938
  - †Listracanthus hildrethi Newberry, 1875
  - †Listracanthus hystrix Newberry & Worthen, 1870
  - †Listracanthus pectenatus Mutter & Neuman, 2006
- †Lobaticorona Johns, 1997
  - †Lobaticorona floriditurris Johns, Barnes & Orchard, 1997
- †Lonchidion Estes, 1964
  - †Lonchidion babulskii Cappetta & Case, 1975
  - †Lonchidion cristatum Cicimurri, Ciampaglio & Runyon, 2014
  - †Lonchidion derenzii Manzanares, Pla, Martínez-Pérez, Ferrón & Botella, 2016
  - †Lonchidion estesi Prasad, Singh, Parmar, Goswami & Sudan, 2008
  - †Lonchidion ferganensis Fischer, Voigt, Schneider, Buchwitz & Voigt, 2011
  - †Lonchidion incumbens Prasad, Singh, Parmar, Goswami & Sudan, 2008
  - †Lonchidion inflexum Underwood & Rees, 2002
  - †Lonchidion khoratensis Cuny, Suttethorn, Kamha, Buffetaut & Philippe, 2006
  - †Lonchidion paramilloensis Johns, Albanesi & Voldman, 2014
  - †Lonchidion reesunderwoodi Cuny, Srisuk, Kamha, Suttethorn & Tong, 2009
  - †Lonchidion rhizion Patterson, 1966
  - †Lonchidion selachos Estes, 1964
- †Lophobatis Cappetta, 1986
  - †Lophobatis phosphaticus Cappetta, 1986

== M ==
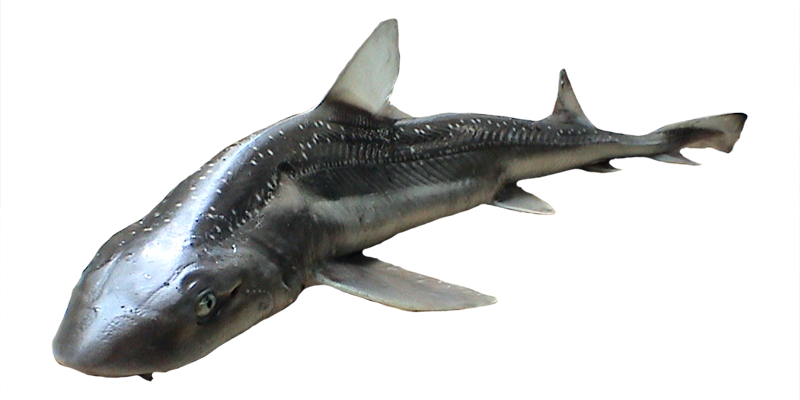
A modern Mustelus sp.

- †Macrorhizodus Glikman, 1964
  - †Macrorhizodus americanus Leriche, 1942
  - †Macrorhizodus nolfi Zhelezko, 1999
- †Macrourogaleus Fowler, 1947
  - †Macrourogaleus hassei Woodward, 1889
- †Mafdetia Werner, 1989
  - †Mafdetia tibniensis Werner, 1989
- †Magistrauia Guinot, Cappetta & Adnet, 2014
  - †Magistrauia unicaplicata Guinot, Cappetta & Adnet, 2014
- †Manberodus Hairapetian, Ginter & Yazdi, 2008
  - †Manberodus fortis Hairapetian, Ginter & Yazdi, 2008
- **Manta** Bancroft, 1829
  - †Manta hynei Bourdon, 1999
- †Marambioraja Engelbrecht, Mörs, Reguero & Kriwet, 2018
  - †Marambioraja leiostemma Engelbrecht, Mörs, Reguero & Kriwet, 2018
- †Marckgrafia Weiler, 1935
  - †Marckgrafia libyca Weiler, 1935
- †Mcmurdodus White 1968
  - †Mcmurdodus featherensis White 1968
  - †Mcmurdodus whitei Turner & Young 1987
- †Mecotrygon Adnet, Marivaux, Cappetta, Charruault, Essid, Jiquel, Ammar, Marandat, Marzougui, Merzeraud, Temani, Vianey-Liaud & Tabuce, 2020
  - †Mecotrygon asperodentulus Adnet, Marivaux, Cappetta, Charruault, Essid, Jiquel, Ammar, Marandat, Marzougui, Merzeraud, Temani, Vianey-Liaud & Tabuce, 2020
- **Megachasma** Taylor, Compagno & Struhsaker, 1983
  - †Megachasma alisonae Shimada & Ward, 2016
  - †Megachasma applegatei Shimada, Welton & Long, 2014
- †Megactenopetalus David, 1944
  - †Megactenopetalus kaibabanus David, 1944
- †Megalolamna Shimada, Chandler, Lam, Tanaka & Ward, 2016
  - †Megalolamna paradoxodon Shimada, Chandler, Lam, Tanaka & Ward, 2016
- †Megarhizodon Sokolov, 1978
  - †Megarhizodon macrorhiza Cope, 1875
- †Megascyliorhinus Cappetta & Ward, 1977
  - †Megascyliorhinus cooperi Cappetta & Ward, 1977
  - †Megascyliorhinus miocaenicus Antunes & Jonet, 1970
  - †Megascyliorhinus trelewensis Cione, 1986
- †Megaselachus Glikman, 1964
  - †Megaselachus chubutensis Ameghino, 1901
- †Megasqualus Herman, 1982
  - †Megasqualus orpiensis Winkler, 1876
- †Meishanselache Wang, Zhu, Jin & Wang, 2007
  - †Meishanselache liui Wang, Zhu, Jin & Wang, 2007
- †Melanodus Darras, Derycke, Blieck & Vachard, 2008
  - †Melanodus loonesi Darras, Derycke, Blieck & Vachard, 2008
- †Mennerotodus Zhelezko, 1994
  - †Mennerotodus glueckmani Zhelezko, 1994
    - †M. g. boktensis Zhelezko, 1999
    - †M. g. glueckmani Zhelezko, 1994
- †Merabatis Cappetta, 1983
  - †Merabatis praealba Arambourg, 1952
- †Meridiania Case, 1994
  - †Meridiania convexa Case, 1994
- †Meridiogaleus Engelbrecht, Mörs, Reguero & Kriwet, 2017
  - †Meridiogaleus cristatus Engelbrecht, Mörs, Reguero & Kriwet, 2017
- †Meristodonoides Underwood & Cumbaa, 2010
  - †Meristodonoides butleri Thurmond, 1971
  - †Meristodonoides multiplicatus Cicimurri, Ciampaglio & Runyon, 2014
  - †Meristodonoides novojerseyensis Case & Cappetta, 2004
  - †Meristodonoides rajkovichi Case, 2001
- †Mesetaraja Engelbrecht, Mörs, Reguero & Kriwet, 2018
  - †Mesetaraja maleficapelli Engelbrecht, Mörs, Reguero & Kriwet, 2018
- †Mesiteia Gorjanovic-Kramberger, 1885
  - †Mesiteia emiliae Gorjanovic-Kramberger, 1885
- †Mesobatis Leidy, 1877
  - †Mesobatis eximius Leidy, 1855
- †Mesodmodus St. John & Worthen, 1875
  - †Mesodmodus explanatus St. John & Worthen, 1875
  - †Mesodmodus exsculptus St. John & Worthen, 1875
  - †Mesodmodus khabenji Derycke-Khatir, 2005
  - †Mesodmodus ornatus St. John & Worthen, 1875
- †Mesogaleus Welton, 1979
  - †Mesogaleus fitchi Welton, 1979
- †Mesolophodus Woodward, 1889
  - †Mesolophodus problematicus Woodward, 1889
- †Metaxyacanthus Obruchev, 1964
  - †Metaxyacanthus rossicus Inostranzew, 1888
- †Metopacanthus Zittel, 1887
  - †Metopacanthus bollensis Fraas, 1910
- †Microbatis Cappetta, 1993
  - †Microbatis sabatieri Cappetta, 1993
- †Microcarcharias Guinot & Carrillo-Briceño, 2018
  - †Microcarcharias saskatchewanensis Case, Tokaryk & Baird, 1990
- †Microdontaspis Case, Schwimmer, Borodin & Leggett, 2001
  - †Microdontaspis tenuis Case, Schwimmer, Borodin & Leggett, 2001
- †Microetmopterus Siverson, 1993
  - †Microetmopterus wardi Siverson, 1993
- †Micropristis Cappetta, 1980
  - †Micropristis solomonis Hay, 1903
  - †Micropristis truyolsi Bernardez, 2002
- †Microscyliorhinus Case, 1994
  - †Microscyliorhinus burnhamensis Cappetta, 1976
  - †Microscyliorhinus leggetti Case, 1999
  - †Microscyliorhinus simplex Noubhani & Cappetta, 1997
- †Microtoxodus Delsate, 2003
  - †Microtoxodus gülakmani Delsate, 2003
- †Microtriftis Sambou, Hautier, Sarr, Tabuce, Lihoreau, Thiam, Lebrun, Martin, Cappetta & Adnet, 2020
  - †Microtriftis matami Sambou, Hautier, Sarr, Tabuce, Lihoreau, Thiam, Lebrun, Martin, Cappetta & Adnet, 2020
- †Misrichthys Case & Cappetta, 1990
  - †Misrichthys stromeri Case & Cappetta, 1990
- **Mitsukurina** Jordan, 1898
  - †Mitsukurina lineata Probst, 1879
  - †Mitsukurina maslinensis Pledge, 1967
- **Mobula** Rafinesque, 1810
  - †Mobula cappettae Jonet, 1976
  - †Mobula fragilis Cappetta, 1970
  - †Mobula lorenzolizanoi Laurito Mora, 1999
  - †Mobula loupianensis Cappetta, 1970
  - †Mobula melanyae Case, 1980
  - †Mobula pectinata Cappetta, 1970
- †Moerigaleus Underwood & Ward, 2011
  - †Moerigaleus vitreodon Underwood & Ward, 2011
- †Monocladodus Claypole, 1893
  - †Monocladodus clarki Claypole, 1893
- †Mooreodontus Hampe & Schneider, 2010
  - †Mooreodontus indicus Jain, 1980
  - †Mooreodontus jaini Bhat, Ray & Datta, 2018
  - †Mooreodontus moorei Woodward, 1889
  - †Mooreodontus parvidens Woodward, 1908
- †Moreyella Gunnell, 1933
  - †Moreyella typicalis Gunnell, 1933
- †Mucrovenator Cuny, Rieppel & Sander, 2001
  - †Mucrovenator minimus Cuny, Rieppel & Sander, 2001
- †Mukdahanodus Cuny, Cavin & Suttethorn, 2008
  - †Mukdahanodus trisivakulii Cuny, Cavin & Suttethorn, 2008
- **Mustelus** Linck, 1790
  - †Mustelus biddlei Baut & Genault, 1995
  - †Mustelus vanderhoefti Herman, 1982
  - †Mustelus whitei Cappetta, 1976
- †Myledaphus Cope, 1876
  - †Myledaphus bipartitus Cope, 1876
  - †Myledaphus pustulosus Cook, Newbrey, Brinkman & Kirkland, 2014
  - †Myledaphus tritus Nessov, 1986
- **Myliobatis** Cuvier, 1816
  - †Myliobatis acutus Agassiz, 1843
  - †Myliobatis affinis Chapman & Cudmore, 1924
  - †Myliobatis albestii Pauca, 1929
  - †Myliobatis altavillae Meschinelli, 1924
  - †Myliobatis altus Davis, 1888
  - †Myliobatis americanus Bravard, 1884
  - †Myliobatis angustidens Sismonda, 1849
  - †Myliobatis angustus Agassiz, 1843
  - †Myliobatis arcuatus Davis, 1888
  - †Myliobatis bellardii Issel, 1877
  - †Myliobatis bilobatus Dartevelle & Casier, 1943
  - †Myliobatis bisulcus Marsh, 1870
  - †Myliobatis bothriodon White, 1926
  - †Myliobatis canaliculatus Agassiz, 1843
  - †Myliobatis colei Agassiz, 1843
  - †Myliobatis crassidens Dartevelle & Casier, 1959
  - †Myliobatis dimorphus Delfortrie, 1871
  - †Myliobatis dispar Leriche, 1913
  - †Myliobatis dixoni Agassiz, 1843
  - †Myliobatis elatus Stromer, 1905
  - †Myliobatis enormis Mendiola, 1999
  - †Myliobatis erctensis Salinas, 1901
  - †Myliobatis fastigiatus Leidy, 1876
  - †Myliobatis fraasi Stromer, 1905
  - †Myliobatis frangens Eastman, 1904
  - †Myliobatis funiculatus Delfortrie, 1871
  - †Myliobatis gigas Cope, 1867
  - †Myliobatis girondicus Pedroni, 1844
  - †Myliobatis goniopleurus Agassiz, 1843
  - †Myliobatis granulosus Issel, 1877
  - †Myliobatis haueri Penecke, 1884
  - †Myliobatis holmesii Gibbes, 1849
  - †Myliobatis intermedius Dartevelle & Casier, 1943
  - †Myliobatis kummeli Fowler, 1911
  - †Myliobatis lagaillardei Thomas, 1904
  - †Myliobatis lateralis Agassiz, 1843
  - †Myliobatis leidyi Hay, 1899
  - †Myliobatis leognanensis Delfortrie, 1871
  - †Myliobatis lepersonnei Dartevelle & Casier, 1959
  - †Myliobatis llopisi Bauzá & Gomez Pallerola, 1982
  - †Myliobatis magister Leidy, 1876
  - †Myliobatis marginalis Agassiz, 1843
  - †Myliobatis merriami Jordan & Beal, 1913
  - †Myliobatis meyeri Weiler, 1922
  - †Myliobatis micropleurus Agassiz, 1843
  - †Myliobatis microrhizus Delfortrie, 1871
  - †Myliobatis miocenicus Böhm, 1942
  - †Myliobatis mokattamensis Stromer, 1905
  - †Myliobatis monnieri Cappetta, 1986
  - †Myliobatis moorabbinensis Chapman & Pritchard, 1907
  - †Myliobatis mordax Leidy, 1876
  - †Myliobatis moutai Dartevelle & Casier, 1959
  - †Myliobatis nzadinensis Dartevelle & Casier, 1943
  - †Myliobatis oweni Agassiz, 1843
  - †Myliobatis pachyodon Cope, 1867
  - †Myliobatis pachyrhizodus Fowler, 1911
  - †Myliobatis pentoni Woodward, 1893
  - †Myliobatis placentinus Carraroli, 1897
  - †Myliobatis plicatilis Davis, 1888
  - †Myliobatis prenticei Chapman & Cudmore, 1924
  - †Myliobatis raouxi Arambourg, 1952
  - †Myliobatis rima Meyer, 1844
  - †Myliobatis rivierei Sauvage, 1878
  - †Myliobatis rugosus Leidy, 1855
  - †Myliobatis salentinus Botti, 1877
  - †Myliobatis semperei Mendiola, 1999
  - †Myliobatis sendaicus Hatai, Murata & Masuda, 1965
  - †Myliobatis serratus Meyer, 1843
  - †Myliobatis sinhaleyus Deraniyagala, 1937
  - †Myliobatis stokesii Agassiz, 1843
  - †Myliobatis striatus Buckland, 1837
  - †Myliobatis strobeli Issel, 1877
  - †Myliobatis testae Philippi, 1846
  - †Myliobatis tewarii Mishra, 1980
  - †Myliobatis toliapicus Agassiz, 1843
  - †Myliobatis transversalis Gibbes, 1849
  - †Myliobatis tumidens Woodward, 1889
  - †Myliobatis undulatus Chaffee, 1939
  - †Myliobatis vicomicanus Cope, 1867
  - †Myliobatis wurnoensis White, 1934
- †Myliodasyatis Noubhani & Cappetta, 1997
  - †Myliodasyatis meskalaensis Noubhani & Cappetta, 1997
- †Myriacanthus Agassiz, 1837
  - †Myriacanthus paradoxus Agassiz, 1843

== N ==
- †Nanocetorhinus Underwood & Schlogl, 2013
  - †Nanocetorhinus tuberculatus Underwood & Schlogl, 2013
  - †Nanocetorhinus zeitlingeri Feichtinger, Pollerspöck & Harzhauser, 2020
- †Nanocorax Cappetta, 2012
  - †Nanocorax microserratodon Shimada, 2008
- †Nanoskalme Hodnett, Elliott, Olson & Wittke, 2012
  - †Nanoskalme natans Hodnett, Elliott, Olson & Wittke, 2012
- †Natarapax Feichtinger, Engelbrecht, Lukeneder & Kriwet, 2018
  - †Natarapax trivortex Feichtinger, Engelbrecht, Lukeneder & Kriwet, 2018
- †Navia Bernardez, 2002
  - †Navia bediae Bernardez, 2002
- **Nebrius** Rüppell, 1837
  - †Nebrius bequaerti Leriche, 1919
  - †Nebrius blanckenhorni Stromer, 1903
  - †Nebrius obliquus Leidy, 1877
  - †Nebrius thielensis Winkler, 1874
- **Negaprion** Whitley, 1940
  - †Negaprion eurybathrodon Blake, 1862
  - †Negaprion frequens Dames, 1883
- †Nemacanthus Agassiz, 1837
  - †Nemacanthus filifer Agassiz, 1843
  - †Nemacanthus monilifer Agassiz, 1843
  - †Nemacanthus splendens Quenstedt, 1885
- †Neosaivodus Hodnett, Elliott, Olson & Wittke, 2012
  - †Neosaivodus flagstaffensis Hodnett, Elliott, Olson & Wittke, 2012
- †Neosinacanthus P'An & Liu, 1975
  - †Neosinacanthus planispinatus P'An & Liu, 1975
- †Netsepoye Lund, 1989
  - †Netsepoye hawesi Lund, 1989
- †Nogueralepis Wang, 1993
  - †Nogueralepis teruelensis Wang, 1993
- †Nolfia Bernardez, 2002
  - †Nolfia esperanzae Bernardez, 2002
- †Notidanodon Cappetta, 1975
  - †Notidanodon brotzeni Siverson, 1995
  - †Notidanodon lanceolatus Woodward, 1886
  - †Notidanodon loozi Vincent, 1876
  - †Notidanodon pectinatus Agassiz, 1843
- †Notidanoides Maisey, 1986
  - †Notidanoides muensteri Agassiz, 1843
- †Notidanus Cuvier, 1816
  - †Notidanus amalthei Oppel, 1854
  - †Notidanus atrox Ameghino, 1899
  - †Notidanus intermedius Wagner, 1862
- †Notoramphoscyllium Engelbrecht, Mörs, Reguero & Kriwet, 2016
  - †Notoramphoscyllium woodwardi Engelbrecht, Mörs, Reguero & Kriwet, 2016
- **Notorynchus** Ayres, 1855
  - †Notorynchus borealus Jordan & Hannibal, 1923
  - †Notorynchus kempi Ward, 1979
  - †Notorynchus lawleyi Cigala Fulgosi, 1983
  - †Notorynchus primigenius Agassiz, 1843
  - †Notorynchus subrecurvus Oppenheimer, 1907

== O ==
- †Obruchevodus Grogan, Lund & Fath, 2014
  - †Obruchevodus griffithi Grogan, Lund & Fath, 2014
- †Occitanodus Guinot, Cappetta & Adnet, 2014
  - †Occitanodus sudrei Guinot, Cappetta & Adnet, 2014
- **Odontaspis** Agassiz, 1838
  - †Odontaspis aculeatus Cappetta & Case, 1975
  - †Odontaspis carolinensis Case & Borodin, 2000
  - †Odontaspis nonelegans Ameghino, 1906
  - †Odontaspis rothi Ameghino, 1906
  - †Odontaspis speyeri Dartevelle & Casier, 1943
  - †Odontaspis watinensis Cook, Wilson, Murray, Plint, Newbrey & Everhart, 2013
  - †Odontaspis winkleri Leriche, 1905
- †Odontorhytis Böhm, 1926
  - †Odontorhytis pappenheimi Böhm, 1926
  - †Odontorhytis priemi Sambou, Hautier, Sarr, Tabuce, Lihoreau, Thiam, Lebrun, Martin, Cappetta & Adnet, 2020
- †Ohiolepis Wells, 1944
  - †Ohiolepis newberryi Wells, 1944
  - †Ohiolepis xitunensis Wang, 1983
- †Oligodalatias Welton, 2016
  - †Oligodalatias jordani Welton, 2016
- †Oligoraja Reinecke, 2015
  - †Oligoraja pristina Reinecke, 2015
- †Omalodus Ginter & Ivanov, 1992
  - †Omalodus bryanti Wells, 1944
  - †Omalodus grabaui Hussakof & Bryant, 1918
  - †Omalodus schultzei Hampe, Aboussalam & Becker, 2004
- †Omanoselache Koot, Cuny, Tintori & Twitchett, 2013
  - †Omanoselache angiolinii Koot, Cuny, Tintori & Twitchett, 2013
  - †Omanoselache bucheri Cuny, Rieppel & Sander, 2001
  - †Omanoselache contrarius Johns, Barnes & Orchard, 1997
  - †Omanoselache halli Koot & Cuny, 2015
  - †Omanoselache hendersoni Koot, Cuny, Tintori & Twitchett, 2013
- †Onchopristis Stromer, 1917
  - †Onchopristis dunklei McNulty & Slaughter, 1962
  - †Onchopristis numidus Haug, 1905
- †Onchosaurus Gervais, 1852
  - †Onchosaurus pharao Dames, 1887
  - †Onchosaurus radicalis Gervais, 1852
- †Oncobatis Leidy, 1873
  - †Oncobatis pentagonus Leidy, 1873
- †Onychoselache Dick, 1978
  - †Onychoselache traquairi Dick, 1978
- †Orectoloboides Cappetta, 1977
  - †Orectoloboides angulatus Underwood & Cumbaa, 2010
  - †Orectoloboides gijseni Herman & Van Den Eeckhaut, 2010
  - †Orectoloboides multistriatus Werner, 1989
  - †Orectoloboides parvula Dalinkevicius, 1935
  - †Orectoloboides reyndersi Adnet, 2006
- **Orectolobus** Bonaparte, 1834
  - †Orectolobus gippslandicus Chapman & Cudmore, 1924
  - †Orectolobus ziegenhinei Cappetta & Case, 2016
- †Orestiacanthus Lund, 1984
  - †Orestiacanthus fergusi Lund, 1984
- †Ornatoscyllium Underwood & Ward, 2004
  - †Ornatoscyllium freemani Underwood & Ward, 2004
  - †Ornatoscyllium glashoffi Thies, 1981
  - †Ornatoscyllium pattersoni Thies, 1983
- †Ornithoprion Zangerl, 1966
  - †Ornithoprion hertwigi Zangerl, 1966
- †Orodus Agassiz, 1838
  - †Orodus catenatus Portlock, 1843
  - †Orodus cinctus Agassiz, 1843
  - †Orodus decussatus St. John & Worthen, 1875
  - †Orodus devonicus Hussakof & Bryant, 1918
  - †Orodus elongatus Davis, 1883
  - †Orodus gibbus Portlock, 1843
  - †Orodus greggi Zangerl, 1981
  - †Orodus ipeunaensis Chahud, Fairchild & Petri, 2010
  - †Orodus mammillaris Newberry & Worthen, 1866
  - †Orodus micropterygius Zangerl, 1981
  - †Orodus minutus Newberry & Worthen, 1866
  - †Orodus moniliformis Davis, 1883
  - †Orodus ornatus Newberry & Worthen, 1866
  - †Orodus ramosus Agassiz, 1843
  - †Orodus tenuis Davis, 1883
  - †Orodus variocostatus St. John & Worthen, 1875
- †Oromobula Adnet, Cappetta, Guinot & Notarbartolo Di Sciara, 2012
  - †Oromobula dakhlaensis Adnet, Cappetta, Guinot & Notarbartolo Di Sciara, 2012
- †Orpodon Cappetta & Nolf, 2005
  - †Orpodon heersensis Herman, 1972
- †Orthacanthus Agassiz, 1843
  - †Orthacanthus bohesmicu Fritsch, 1889
  - †Orthacanthus buxieri Heyler & Poplin, 1990
  - †Orthacanthus commailli Heyler & Poplin, 1982
  - †Orthacanthus compressus Newberry, 1856
  - †Orthacanthus cylindricus Agassiz, 1843
  - †Orthacanthus denticulatus Davis, 1880
  - †Orthacanthus donnelljohnsi Johnson & Thayer, 2010
  - †Orthacanthus gibbosus Binney, 1841
  - †Orthacanthus gracilis Giebel, 1848
  - †Orthacanthus huberi Zidek, 1992
  - †Orthacanthus kounoviensis Fritsch, 1889
  - †Orthacanthus meridionalis Soler-Gijón, 1997
  - †Orthacanthus pinguis Fritsch, 1889
  - †Orthacanthus platypternus Cope, 1884
  - †Orthacanthus texensis Cope, 1888
- †Orthacodus Woodward, 1889
  - †Orthacodus longidens Agassiz, 1843
- †Orthechinorhinus Adnet, 2006
  - †Orthechinorhinus davidae Welton, 2016
  - †Orthechinorhinus pfeili Adnet, 2006
- †Orthodon Coquand, 1860
  - †Orthodon condamyi Coquand, 1860
- †Ossianodus Ginter, 2016
  - †Ossianodus nebraskensis Ginter, 2016
- †Ostarriraja Marramà, Schultz & Kriwet, 2018
  - †Ostarriraja parva Marramà, Schultz & Kriwet, 2018
- †Ostenoselache Duffin, 1998
  - †Ostenoselache stenosoma Duffin, 1998
- †Otodus Agassiz, 1843
  - †Otodus aksuaticus Menner, 1928
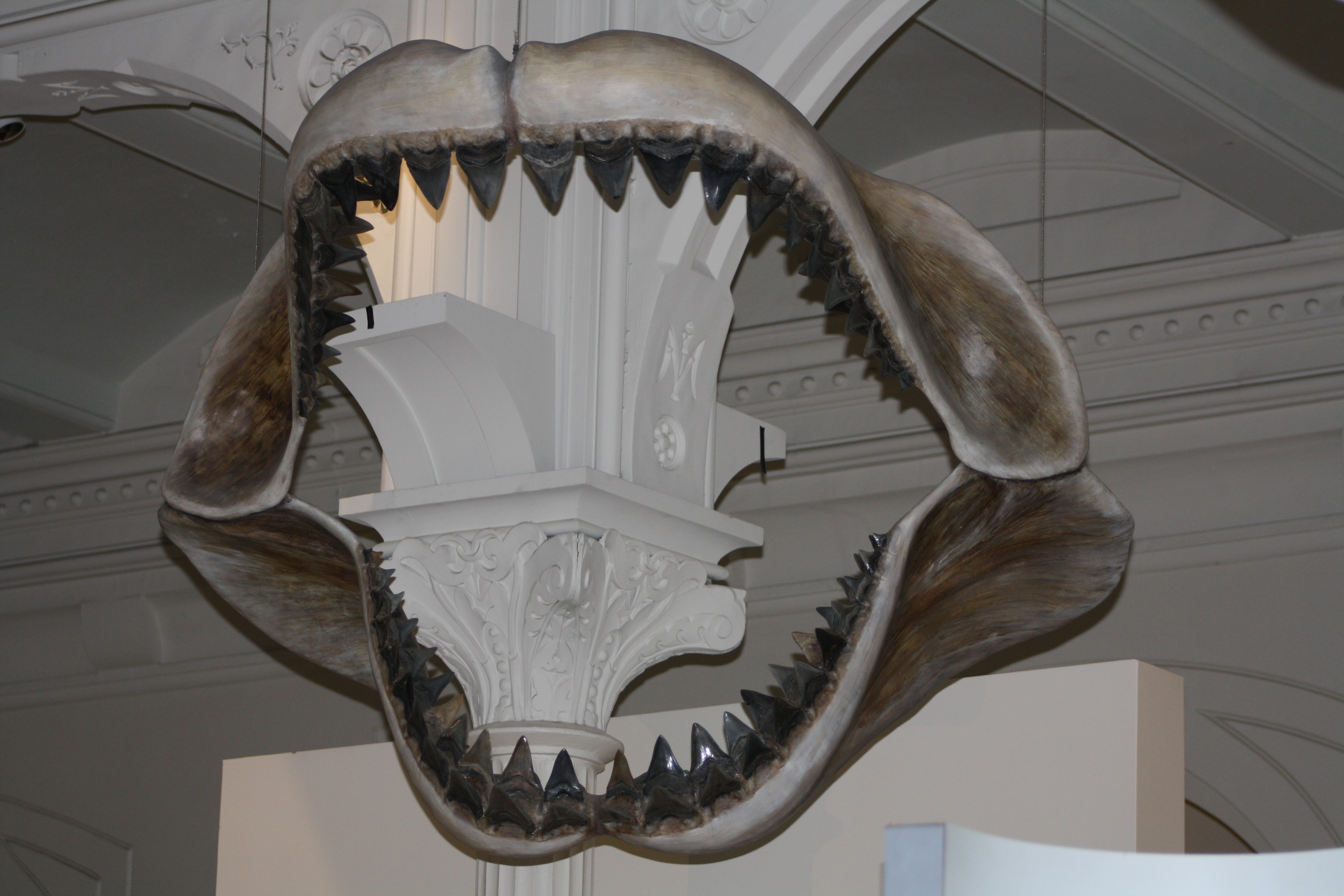
  - Otodus megalodon
    †Otodus angustidens Agassiz, 1843
  - †Otodus auriculatus Blainville, 1818
  - †Otodus hastalis Lawley, 1876
  - †Otodus limhamnensis Davis, 1890
  - †Otodus luypaertsi Herman & Van Den Eeckhaut, 2010
  - †Otodus megalodon Agassiz, 1843
  - †Otodus minor Giebel, 1848
    - †O. m. minor Giebel, 1848
    - †O. m. turkmenicus Zhelezko, 1999
  - †Otodus naidini Zhelezko, 1999
  - †Otodus obliquus Agassiz, 1843
    - †O. o. ajatensis Zhelezko, 1999
    - †O. o. mugodzharicus Zhelezko, 1999
    - †O. o. obliquus Agassiz, 1843
  - †Otodus poseidoni Zhelezko, 1999
    - †O. p. poseidoni Zhelezko, 1999
    - †O. p. turanensis Zhelezko, 1999
    - †O. p. ustyurtensis Zhelezko, 1999
  - †Otodus sokolovi Jaekel, 1895
    - †O. s. caspiensis Zhelezko, 1999
    - †O. s. sokolovi Jaekel, 1895
- †Ouledia Cappetta, 1986
  - †Ouledia lacuna Adnet, Marivaux, Cappetta, Charruault, Essid, Jiquel, Ammar, Marandat, Marzougui, Merzeraud, Temani, Vianey-Liaud & Tabuce, 2020
  - †Ouledia sigei Cappetta, 1986
- **Oxynotus** Rafiniesque, 1810
  - †Oxynotus crochardi Welton, 1981
- †Oxyprinichthys Ameghino, 1901
  - †Oxyprinichthys prioniferus Ameghino, 1901
- †Oxytomodus Trautschold 1879
  - †Oxytomodus argutus Trautschold 1879
- †Ozarcus Pradel, Maisey, Tafforeau, Mapes & Mallatt, 2014
  - †Ozarcus mapesae Pradel, Maisey, Tafforeau, Mapes & Mallatt, 2014

== P ==
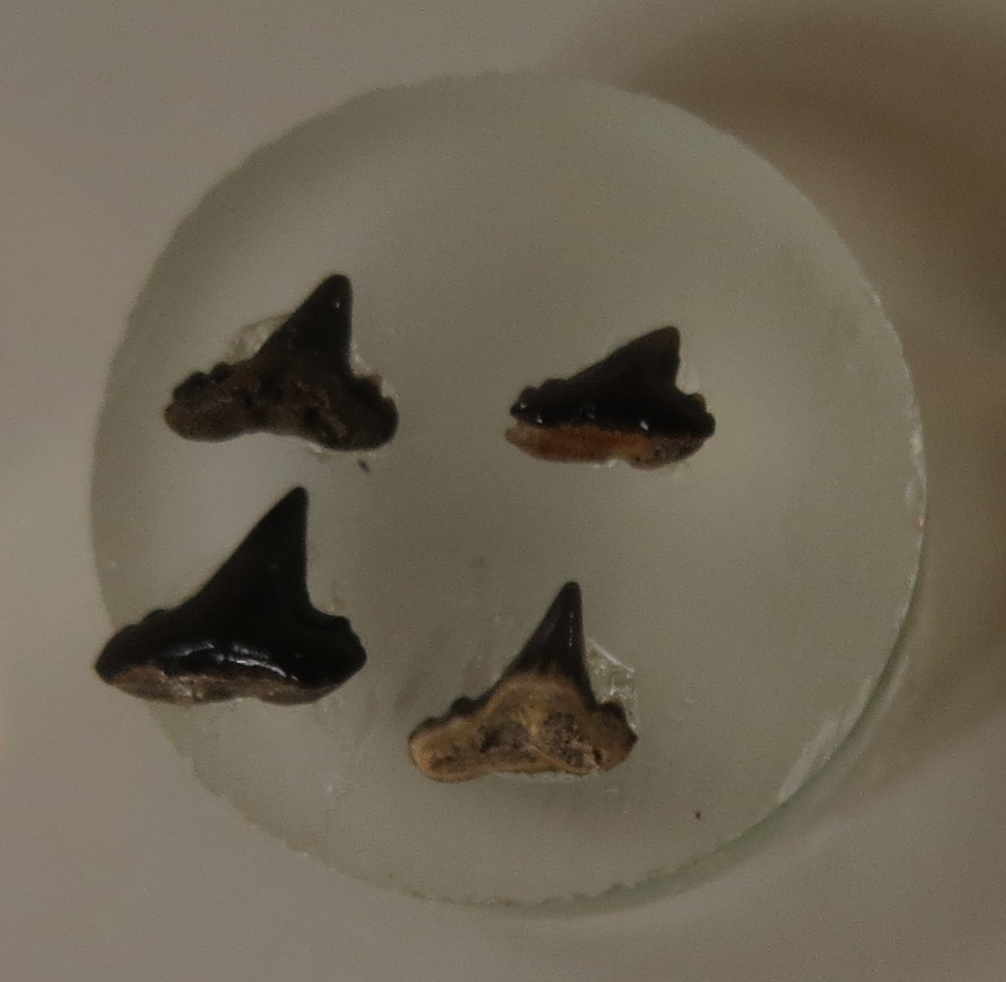
Palaeogaleus faujasi

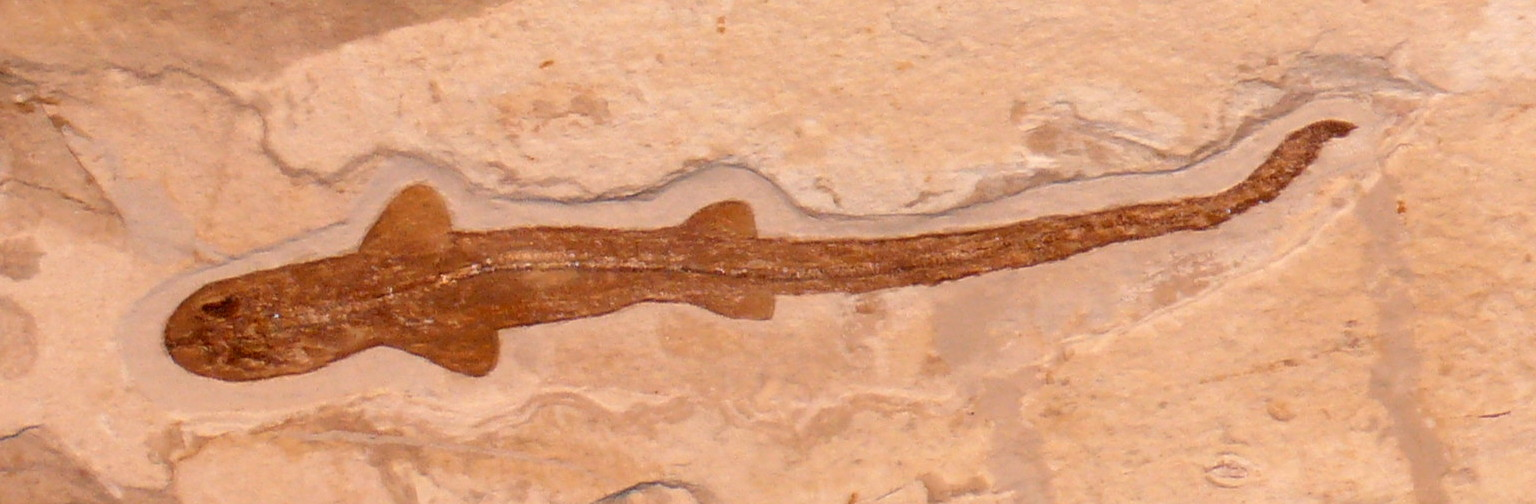
Palaeotriakis curtirostris

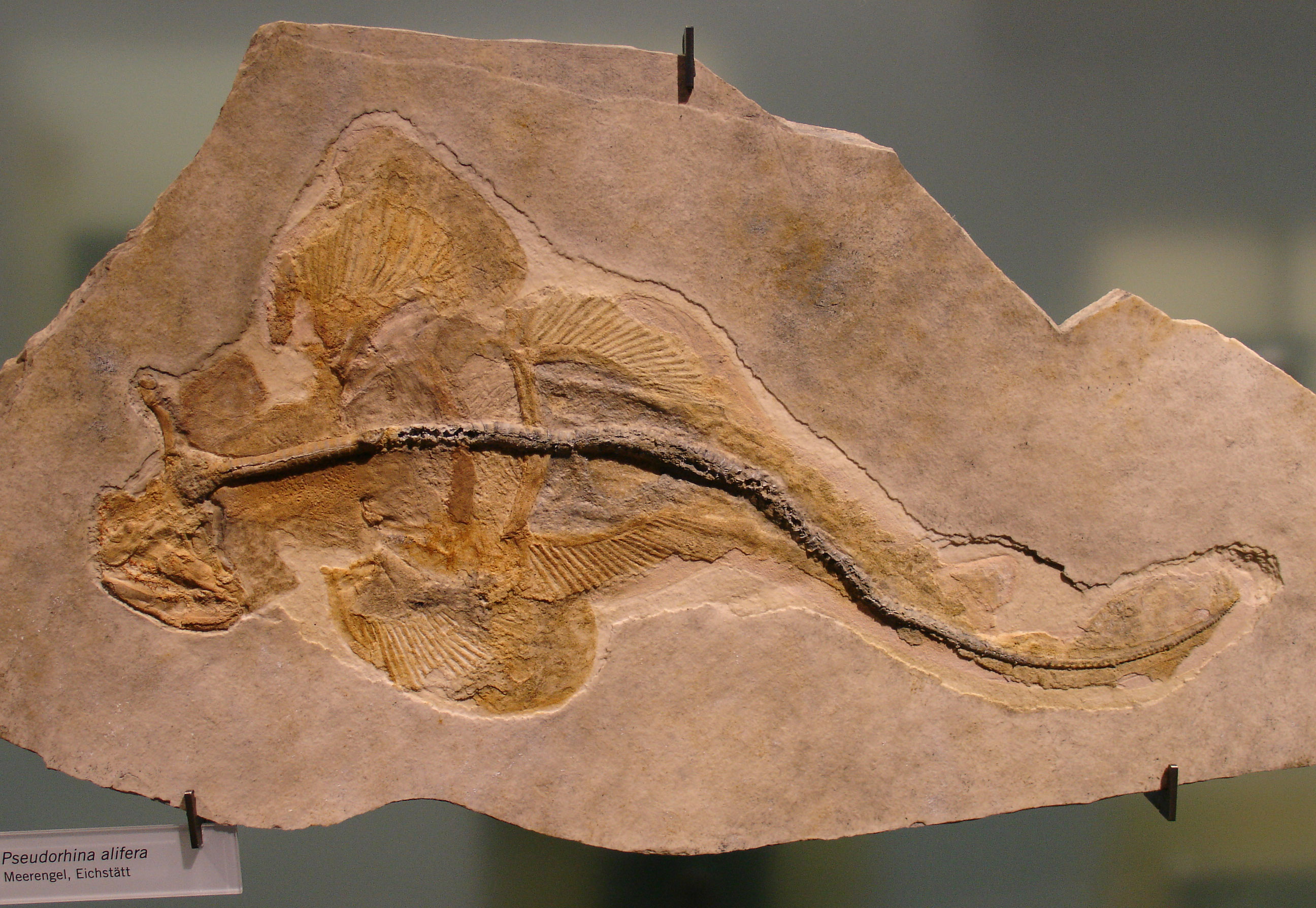
Pseudorhina alifera

- †Pachygaleus Cappetta, 1992
  - †Pachygaleus lefevrei Daimeries, 1891
- †Pachygymnura Adnet, Marivaux, Cappetta, Charruault, Essid, Jiquel, Ammar, Marandat, Marzougui, Merzeraud, Temani, Vianey-Liaud & Tabuce, 2020
  - †Pachygymnura attiai Cook, 2010
- †Pachyhexanchus Cappetta, 1990
  - †Pachyhexanchus pockrandti Ward & Thies, 1987
- †Pachyscyllium Reinecke, Moths, Grant & Breitkreuz, 2005
  - †Pachyscyllium albigensis Reinecke, Moths, Grant & Breitkreuz, 2005
  - †Pachyscyllium braaschi Reinecke, Moths, Grant & Breitkreuz, 2005
  - †Pachyscyllium dachiardii Lawley, 1876
  - †Pachyscyllium distans Probst, 1879
- †Palaeobates Meyer, 1849
  - †Palaeobates angustissimus Agassiz, 1834
  - †Palaeobates polaris Stensiö, 1921
  - †Palaeobates reticulatus Duffin, 1998
  - †Palaeobates verzilini Nessov & Kaznyshkin, 1988
- †Palaeobrachaelurus Thies, 1983
  - †Palaeobrachaelurus alisonae Thies, 1983
  - †Palaeobrachaelurus aperizostus Thies, 1983
  - †Palaeobrachaelurus mitchelli Underwood, 2004
  - †Palaeobrachaelurus mussetti Underwood & Ward, 2004
- †Palaeocarcharias De Beaumont, 1960
  - †Palaeocarcharias stromeri De Beaumont, 1960
- †Palaeocarcharodon Casier, 1960
  - †Palaeocarcharodon orientalis Sinzow, 1899
- † Palaeocentroscymnus Pollerspöck, Flammensbeck & Straube, 2018
  - †Palaeocentroscymnus horvathi Underwood & Schlogl, 2013
- †Palaeodasyatis Halter, 1989
  - †Palaeodasyatis hermani Halter, 1989
- †Palaeogaleus Gurr, 1962
  - †Palaeogaleus brivesi Arambourg, 1952
  - †Palaeogaleus dahmanii Noubhani & Cappetta, 1997
  - †Palaeogaleus faujasi Van De Geyn, 1937
  - †Palaeogaleus havreensis Herman, 1977
  - †Palaeogaleus larachei Noubhani & Cappetta, 1997
  - †Palaeogaleus navarroensis Case & Cappetta, 1997
  - †Palaeogaleus prior Arambourg, 1952
  - †Palaeogaleus sublaevis Noubhani & Cappetta, 1997
  - †Palaeogaleus vincenti Daimeries, 1888
- †Palaeoheterodontus Hovestadt, 2018
  - †Palaeoheterodontus sarstedtensis (Thies, 1983)
- †Palaeohypotodus Glikman, 1964
  - †Palaeohypotodus bizzocoi
  - †Palaeohypotodus bronni Agassiz, 1843
  - †Palaeohypotodus rutoti Winkler, 1876
  - †Palaeohypotodus volgensis Zhelezko, 1999
- †Palaeomyliobatis Silva Santos & Travassos, 1960
  - †Palaeomyliobatis pirabensis Silva Santos & Travassos, 1960
- †Palaeorectolobus Kriwet, 2008
  - †Palaeorectolobus agomphius Kriwet, 2008
- †Palaeorhincodon Herman, 1974
  - †Palaeorhincodon daouii Noubhani & Cappetta, 1997
  - †Palaeorhincodon dartevellei Arambourg, 1952
  - †Palaeorhincodon wardi Herman, 1974
- †Palaeoscyllium Wagner, 1857
  - †Palaeoscyllium formosum Wagner, 1857
  - †Palaeoscyllium tenuidens Underwood & Ward, 2004
- †Palaeospinax Egerton, 1872
  - †Palaeospinax egertoni Woodward, 1889
  - †Palaeospinax ejuncidus Lambe, 1918
  - †Palaeospinax pinnai Duffin, 1987
  - †Palaeospinax politus Thies, 1992
  - †Palaeospinax priscus Agassiz, 1843
  - †Palaeospinax riegrafi Thies, 1983
- †Palaeotriakis Guinot, Underwood, Cappetta & Ward, 2013
  - †Palaeotriakis curtirostris Davis, 1887
  - †Palaeotriakis subserratus Underwood & Ward, 2008
- †Palaeoxyris Brongniart, 1828
  - †Palaeoxyris alterna Fischer, Voigt, Schneider, Buchwitz & Voigt, 2011
  - †Palaeoxyris appendiculata Lesquereux, 1870
  - †Palaeoxyris bohemica Crookall, 1930
  - †Palaeoxyris carbonaria Schimper, 1830
  - †Palaeoxyris corrugata Anonymous author(s)
  - †Palaeoxyris duni Crookall, 1930
  - †Palaeoxyris edwardsi Crookall, 1928
  - †Palaeoxyris friessi Böttcher, 2010
  - †Palaeoxyris helicteroides Morris, 1840
  - †Palaeoxyris humblei Fischer, Axsmith & Ash, 2010
  - †Palaeoxyris johnsoni Kidston, 1885
  - †Palaeoxyris jugleri Von Ettingshausen, 1852
  - †Palaeoxyris lewisi Zidec, 1976
  - †Palaeoxyris muelleri Frentzen, 1932
  - †Palaeoxyris muensteri Presl, 1838
  - †Palaeoxyris multiplicatum Anonymous author(s)
  - †Palaeoxyris regularis Brongniart, 1828
  - †Palaeoxyris taurica Chabakov, 1949
  - †Palaeoxyris warei Crookall, 1928
- †Palidiplospinax Klug & Kriwet, 2007
  - †Palidiplospinax enniskilleni Duffin & Ward, 1993
  - †Palidiplospinax occultidens Duffin & Ward, 1993
  - †Palidiplospinax smithwoodwardi Fraas, 1896
- †Papilionichthys Grogan & Lund, 2009
  - †Papilionichthys stahlae Grogan & Lund, 2009
- †Paraanacorax Glikman, 1980
  - †Paraanacorax bassanii Gemmellaro, 1920
- †Paracestracion Koken, 1911
  - †Paracestracion belle Underwood & Ward, 2004
  - †Paracestracion falcifer (Wagner, 1857)
  - †Paracestracion pectinatum Guinot, Cappetta & Adnet, 2014
  - †Paracestracion viohli Kriwet, 2008
- †Paracymatodus Bogoliubov, 1914
  - †Paracymatodus plicatulus Anonymous author(s)
- †Paraechinorhinus Welton, 1983
  - †Paraechinorhinus barnesi Welton, 1983
  - †Paraechinorhinus riepli Pfeil, 1981
- †Paraetmopterus Adnet, 2006
  - †Paraetmopterus nolfi Adnet, 2006
- **Paragaleus** Budker, 1935
  - †Paragaleus antunesi Balbino & Cappetta, 2000
  - †Paragaleus pulchellus Jonet, 1966
- †Paraginglymostoma Herman, 1982
  - †Paraginglymostoma bedfordensis Thies, 1983
  - †Paraginglymostoma bloti Herman, 1982
- †Parahelicampodus Nielsen, 1952
  - †Parahelicampodus spaercki Nielsen, 1952
- †Parahelicoprion Karpinsky, 1922
  - †Parahelicoprion clerci Karpinsky, 1916
  - †Parahelicoprion mariosuarezi Merino-Rodo & Janvier, 1986
- †Parahemiscyllium Guinot, Cappetta & Adnet, 2014
  - †Parahemiscyllium underwoodwardi Guinot, Cappetta & Adnet, 2014
- †Paraheptranchias Pfeil, 1981
  - †Paraheptranchias repens Probst, 1879
- †Paraisurus Glikman, 1957
  - †Paraisurus amudarjensis Mertiniene, Nessov & Nazarkin, 1994
  - †Paraisurus compressus Sokolov, 1978
  - †Paraisurus elegans Sokolov, 1978
  - †Paraisurus lanceolatus Sokolov, 1978
  - †Paraisurus macrorhiza Pictet & Campiche, 1858
- †Paranomotodon Herman, 1975
  - †Paranomotodon angustidens Reuss, 1845
- †Paraorthacodus Glikman, 1957
  - †Paraorthacodus andersoni Case, 1978
  - †Paraorthacodus antarcticus Klug, Kriwet, Lirio & Nuñez, 2008
  - †Paraorthacodus arduennae Delsate, 2001
  - †Paraorthacodus clarkii Eastman, 1901
  - †Paraorthacodus conicus Davis, 1890
  - †Paraorthacodus eocaenus Leriche, 1902
  - †Paraorthacodus jurensis Schweizer, 1964
  - †Paraorthacodus recurvus Trautschold, 1877
  - †Paraorthacodus rossi Cappetta, Morrison & Adnet, 2019
  - †Paraorthacodus turgaicus Glikman, 1964
- †Parapalaeobates Weiler, 1930
  - †Parapalaeobates atlanticus Arambourg, 1952
  - †Parapalaeobates glickmani Nessov, Mertiniene & Udovitshenko, 1986
  - †Parapalaeobates pygmaeus Quaas, 1902
- †Paraphorosoides Kriwet, Thies & Müller, 2006
  - †Paraphorosoides ursulae Thies & Müller, 1993
- †Paraptychodus Hamm, 2015
  - †Paraptychodus washitaensis Hamm, 2015
- †Pararhincodon Herman, 1976
  - †Pararhincodon crochardi Herman, 1977
  - †Pararhincodon germaini Adnet, 2006
  - †Pararhincodon groessensi Herman, 1982
  - †Pararhincodon lehmani Cappetta, 1980
  - †Pararhincodon ornatus Guinot, Underwood, Cappetta & Ward, 2013
  - †Pararhincodon susanae Bernardez, 2002
  - †Pararhincodon ypresiensis Cappetta, 1976
- †Parascylloides Thies, Vespermann & Solcher, 2014
  - †Parascylloides turnerae Thies, Vespermann & Solcher, 2014
- †Parasquatina Herman, 1982
  - †Parasquatina cappettai Herman, 1982
  - †Parasquatina jarvisi Guinot, Underwood, Cappetta & Ward, 2012
  - †Parasquatina justinensis Guinot, Underwood, Cappetta & Ward, 2012
  - †Parasquatina zitteli Pollerspöck & Beaury, 2014
- †Paratriakis Herman, 1977
  - †Paratriakis bettrechiensis Herman, 1977
  - †Paratriakis decheni Von Der Marck, 1863
  - †Paratriakis robustus Guinot, Underwood, Cappetta & Ward, 2013
  - †Paratriakis tenuis Underwood & Ward, 2008
- †Paratrygonorrhina Kriwet, Soler-Gijón & López-Martínez, 2007
  - †Paratrygonorrhina amblysoda Kriwet, Soler-Gijón & López-Martínez, 2007
- †Paredestus Mutter & Neuman, 2008
  - †Paredestus bricircum Mutter & Neuman, 2008
- †Parotodus Cappetta, 1980
  - †Parotodus benedenii Le Hon, 1871
  - †Parotodus mangyshlakensis Kozlov, 1999
  - †Parotodus pavlovi Menner, 1928
- †Parvicorona Chen & Cuny, 2003
  - †Parvicorona dacrysulca Chen & Cuny, 2003
- †Parvidiabolus Johns, 1997
  - †Parvidiabolus convexus Johns, Barnes & Orchard, 1997
  - †Parvidiabolus yichangensis Zhang, Zeng, Chen, Li, Zhou & Zhang, 2013
- †Parvodus Rees & Underwood, 2002
  - †Parvodus celsucuspus Rees, Cuny, Pouech & Mazin, 2013
  - †Parvodus heterodon Patterson, 1966
  - †Parvodus rugianus Ansorge, 1990
- †Peilepis Wang, 1984
  - †Peilepis solida Wang, 1984
- †Peripristis St. John, 1870
  - †Peripristis semicircularis Newberry & Worthen, 1866
- †Petalodus Owen, 1840
  - †Petalodus acuminatus Agassiz, 1838
  - †Petalodus alleghaniensis Leidy, 1856
  - †Petalodus curtus Newberry & Worthen, 1870
  - †Petalodus daihuaensis Wang & Turner, 1985
  - †Petalodus destructor Newberry & Worthen, 1866
  - †Petalodus flabellula Woodward, 1889
  - †Petalodus grandis Davis, 1883
  - †Petalodus hastingsiae Owen, 1840
  - †Petalodus hybridus St. John & Worthen, 1875
  - †Petalodus inequilateralis Davis, 1883
  - †Petalodus jewetti Miller, 1957
  - †Petalodus knappi Newberry, 1879
  - †Petalodus linguifer Newberry & Worthen, 1866
  - †Petalodus ohioensis Safford, 1851
  - †Petalodus proximus St. John & Worthen, 1875
  - †Petalodus rectus Agassiz, 1840
  - †Petalodus recurvus Davis, 1883
  - †Petalodus securiger Hay, 1895
  - †Petalodus serratus Owen, 1840
  - †Petalodus shinhkuoi Young, 1950
- †Petalorhynchus Newberry & Worthen, 1866
  - †Petalorhynchus beargulchensis Lund, 1989
  - †Petalorhynchus distortus St. John & Worthen, 1875
  - †Petalorhynchus pseudosagittatus St. John & Worthen, 1875
  - †Petalorhynchus psittacinus McCoy, 1885
  - †Petalorhynchus spatulatus St. John & Worthen, 1875
  - †Petalorhynchus striatus Newberry & Worthen, 1866
- †Peyeria Weiler, 1935
  - †Peyeria libyca Weiler, 1935
- †Phoebodus St. John & Worthen, 1875
  - †Phoebodus ancestralis Wang, 1993
  - †Phoebodus bifurcatus Ginter & Ivanov, 1992
  - †Phoebodus depressus Ginter, Hairapetian & Klug, 2002
  - †Phoebodus fastigatus Ginter & Ivanov, 1992
  - †Phoebodus gothicus Ginter, 1990
    - †P. g. gothicus Ginter, 1990
    - †P. g. transitans Ginter, Hairapetian & Klug, 2002
  - †Phoebodus latus Ginter & Ivanov, 1995
  - †Phoebodus limpidus Ginter, 1990
  - †Phoebodus politus Newberry, 1889
  - †Phoebodus rayi Ginter & Turner, 1999
  - †Phoebodus sophiae St. John & Worthen, 1875
  - †Phoebodus turnerae Ginter & Ivanov, 1992
  - †Phoebodus typicus Ginter & Ivanov, 1995
- †Phorcynis Thiollère, 1852
  - †Phorcynis catulina Thiollère, 1852
- †Phosphatobatis Cappetta, 1991
  - †Phosphatobatis aegyptiaca Cappetta, 1991
- †Physogaleus Cappetta, 1980
  - †Physogaleus americanus Case, 1994
  - †Physogaleus contortus Gibbes, 1849
  - †Physogaleus hemmooriensis Reinecke & Hödemakers, 2006
  - †Physogaleus latecuspidatus Müller, 1999
  - †Physogaleus latus Storms, 1894
  - †Physogaleus maltzani Winkler, 1875
  - †Physogaleus minor Agassiz, 1843
  - †Physogaleus secundus Winkler, 1876
  - †Physogaleus tertius Winkler, 1874
- †Physonemus McCoy, 1848
  - †Physonemus acinaciformis St. John & Worthen, 1875
  - †Physonemus anceps Newberry & Worthen, 1866
  - †Physonemus baculiformis St. John & Worthen, 1875
  - †Physonemus gemmatus Newberry & Worthen, 1866
  - †Physonemus mirabilis St. John & Worthen, 1875
- †Pirodus Lebedev, 2001
  - †Pirodus conicus Lebedev, 2001
- †Planodens Li, 1995
  - †Planodens wuqicus Li, 1995
- †Planohybodus Rees & Underwood, 2008
  - †Planohybodus ensis Woodward, 1916
  - †Planohybodus grossiconus Agassiz, 1843
  - †Planohybodus marki Pinheiro, De Figueiredo, Dentzien-Dias, Fortier, Schultz & Viana, 2013
  - †Planohybodus peterboroughensis Rees & Underwood, 2008
- †Platyacanthus Fritsch, 1889
  - †Platyacanthus avirostratus Zidek, 1978
  - †Platyacanthus ventricosus Fritsch, 1889
- †Platypterix Kriwet, Nunn & Klug, 2009
  - †Platypterix venustulus Kriwet, Nunn & Klug, 2009
- **Platyrhina** Müller & Henle, 1838
  - †Platyrhina gigantea Blainville, 1818
- †Platyrhizodon Guinot, Underwood, Cappetta & Ward, 2013
  - †Platyrhizodon barbei Guinot, Underwood, Cappetta & Ward, 2013
  - †Platyrhizodon gracilis Guinot, Underwood, Cappetta & Ward, 2013
- †Platyrhizoscyllium Adnet, 2006
  - †Platyrhizoscyllium jaegeri Adnet, 2006
- †Platyxystrodus Hay, 1899
  - †Platyxystrodus striatus Davis, 1883
- **Plesiobatis** Nishida, 1990
  - †Plesiobatis vandenboschi Bor, Reinecke & Verschueren, 2012
- †Plesioselachus Anderson, Long, Gess & Hiller, 1999
  - †Plesioselachus macracanthus Anderson, Long, Gess & Hiller, 1999
- †Plesiozanobatus Marramà, Carnevale, Claeson, Naylor & Kriwet, 2020
  - †Plesiozanobatus egertoni De Zigno, 1876
- †Pleuroplax Woodward, 1889
  - †Pleuroplax rankinei Agassiz, 1883
  - †Pleuroplax woodi Davis, 1883
- †Plicatodus Hampe, 1995
  - †Plicatodus jordani Hampe, 1995
  - †Plicatodus plicatus Fritsch, 1889
- †Plicatopristis Cappetta, 1991
  - †Plicatopristis strougoi Cappetta, 1991
- †Plicatoscyllium Case & Cappetta, 1997
  - †Plicatoscyllium antiquum Case & Cappetta, 1997
  - †Plicatoscyllium derameei Case & Cappetta, 1997
  - †Plicatoscyllium gharbii Noubhani & Cappetta, 1997
  - †Plicatoscyllium globidens Cappetta & Case, 1975
  - †Plicatoscyllium lehneri Leriche, 1938
  - †Plicatoscyllium minutum Forir, 1887
  - †Plicatoscyllium pectinatum Noubhani & Cappetta, 1997
  - †Plicatoscyllium youssoufiaense Noubhani & Cappetta, 1997
- †Plinthicus Cope, 1869
  - †Plinthicus kruibekensis Bor, 1990
  - †Plinthicus stenodon Cope, 1869
- †Poecilodus Agassiz, 1838
  - †Poecilodus cestriensis St. John & Worthen, 1883
- †Polyacrodus Jaekel, 1889
  - †Polyacrodus balabansaiensis Nessov & Kaznyshkin, 1988
  - †Polyacrodus brevicostatus Patterson, 1966
  - †Polyacrodus gramanni Duffin & Thies, 1997
  - †Polyacrodus illingworthi Dixon, 1850
  - †Polyacrodus jiangxiensis Wang, Zhu, Jin & Wang, 2007
  - †Polyacrodus keuperianus Schmidt, 1928
  - †Polyacrodus lapalomensis Johnson, 1981
  - †Polyacrodus maiseyi Landemaine, 1991
  - †Polyacrodus parvidens Woodward, 1916
  - †Polyacrodus polycyphus Agassiz, 1837
  - †Polyacrodus prodigialis Nessov & Kaznyshkin, 1988
  - †Polyacrodus ritchiei Johnson, 1981
  - †Polyacrodus siversoni Rees, 1999
  - †Polyacrodus tiandongensis Wang, Yang, Jin & Wang, 2001
  - †Polyacrodus torosus Nessov & Mertiniene, 1991
  - †Polyacrodus tregoi Rieppel, Kindlimann & Bucher, 1996
  - †Polyacrodus twitchetti De Blanger, 2005
  - †Polyacrodus wichitaensis Johnson, 1981
- †Polyfaciodus Koot & Cuny, 2015
  - †Polyfaciodus pandus Koot & Cuny, 2015
- †Polymerolepis Karatajute & Talimaa, 1968
  - †Polymerolepis whitei Karatajute & Talimaa, 1968
- †Polyrhizodus McCoy, 1848
  - †Polyrhizodus amplus St. John & Worthen, 1875
  - †Polyrhizodus attenuatus Davis, 1883
  - †Polyrhizodus colei St. John & Worthen, 1875
  - †Polyrhizodus concavus Trautschold, 1874
  - †Polyrhizodus constrictus Davis, 1883
  - †Polyrhizodus digitatus Leidy, 1857
  - †Polyrhizodus elongatus Davis, 1883
  - †Polyrhizodus excavates St. John & Worthen, 1875
  - †Polyrhizodus inflexus Newberry & Worthen, 1866
  - †Polyrhizodus latus Newberry, 1897
  - †Polyrhizodus lobatus Newberry & Worthen, 1866
  - †Polyrhizodus longus Trautschold, 1879
  - †Polyrhizodus magnus McCoy, 1848
  - †Polyrhizodus minimus St. John & Worthen, 1875
  - †Polyrhizodus modestus Newberry, 1875
  - †Polyrhizodus nanus St. John & Worthen, 1875
  - †Polyrhizodus porosus Newberry & Worthen, 1866
  - †Polyrhizodus princeps Newberry & Worthen, 1866
  - †Polyrhizodus radicans Agassiz, 1840
  - †Polyrhizodus sinuosus Davis, 1883
  - †Polyrhizodus williamsi St. John & Worthen, 1875
- †Polysentor Zangerl, 1979
  - †Polysentor gorbairdi Zangerl, 1979
- †Porodermoides Noubhani & Cappetta, 1997
  - †Porodermoides spanios Noubhani & Cappetta, 1997
- †Portalodus Long & Young, 1995
  - †Portalodus bradshawae Long & Young, 1995
  - †Portalodus mannoliniae Potvin-Leduc, Cloutier, Landing, Van Aller Hernick & Mannolini, 2015
- †Posadaia Bernardez, 2002
  - †Posadaia nolfi Müller & Diedrich, 1991
- **Potamotrygon** Garman, 1877
  - †Potamotrygon canaanorum Chabain, Antoine, Altamirano-Sierra, Marivaux, Pujos, Gismondi & Adnet, 2017
  - †Potamotrygon contamanensis Chabain, Antoine, Altamirano-Sierra, Marivaux, Pujos, Gismondi & Adnet, 2017
  - †Potamotrygon rajachloeae Chabain, Antoine, Altamirano-Sierra, Marivaux, Pujos, Gismondi & Adnet, 2017
  - †Potamotrygon ucayalensis Adnet, Gismondi & Antoine, 2014
- †Potobatis Cappetta & Gayet, 2013
  - †Potobatis semperei Cappetta & Gayet, 2013
- †Praeproscyllium Underwood & Ward, 2004
  - †Praeproscyllium oxoniensis Underwood & Ward, 2004
- †Praeptychocorax Glikman, 1980
  - †Praeptychocorax curvatus Williston, 1900
- †Premontreia Cappetta, 1992
  - †Premontreia degremonti Cappetta, 1992
  - †Premontreia gilberti Casier, 1946
  - †Premontreia lutetiensis Mollen, 2008
  - †Premontreia peypouqueti Noubhani & Cappetta, 1997
  - †Premontreia subulidens Arambourg, 1952
  - †Premontreia uralica Malyshkina, 2006
- †Priohybodus Erasmo, 1960
  - †Priohybodus arambourgi Erasmo, 1960
- †Priscusurus Kriwet, 2006
  - †Priscusurus adruptodontus Kriwet, 2006
- †Pristacanthus Agassiz, 1837
  - †Pristacanthus securis Agassiz, 1843
- †Pristicladodus M'Coy 1855
  - †Pristicladodus armatus Saint John & Worthen 1875
  - †Pristicladodus concinnus Davis 1883
  - †Pristicladodus dentatus M'Coy 1855
  - †Pristicladodus goughi McCoy 1848
- **Pristiophorus** Müller & Henle, 1837
  - †Pristiophorus austriacus Reinecke, Pollerspöck, Motomura, Bracher, Dufraing, Güthner & von der Hocht, 2020
  - †Pristiophorus borealis Reinecke, Pollerspöck, Motomura, Bracher, Dufraing, Güthner & von der Hocht, 2020
  - †Pristiophorus lacipidinensis Adnet, 2006
  - †Pristiophorus laevis Engelbrecht, Mörs, Reguero & Kriwet, 2016
  - †Pristiophorus lanceolatus Davis, 1888
  - †Pristiophorus lineatus Applegate & Uyeno, 1968
  - †Pristiophorus pricei Cappetta, Morrison & Adnet, 2019
  - †Pristiophorus rupeliensis Steurbaut & Herman, 1978
  - †Pristiophorus smithi Cappetta, Morrison & Adnet, 2019
  - †Pristiophorus striatus Underwood & Schlogl, 2013
  - †Pristiophorus suevicus Jaekel, 1890
  - †Pristiophorus tortonicus Reinecke, Pollerspöck, Motomura, Bracher, Dufraing, Güthner & von der Hocht, 2020
  - †Pristiophorus ungeri Reinecke, Pollerspöck, Motomura, Bracher, Dufraing, Güthner & von der Hocht, 2020
- **Pristis** Linck, 1790
  - †Pristis acutidens Agassiz, 1843
  - †Pristis agassizi Gibbes, 1847
  - †Pristis amblodon Cope, 1869
  - †Pristis aquitanicus Delfortrie, 1871
  - †Pristis atlanticus Zbyszewski, 1947
  - †Pristis attenuatus Cope, 1869
  - †Pristis brachyodon Cope, 1869
  - †Pristis brayi Casier, 1949
  - †Pristis brevis Casier, 1949
  - †Pristis caheni Dartevelle & Casier, 1959
  - †Pristis crassidens Dartevelle & Casier, 1959
  - †Pristis curvidens Leidy, 1855
  - †Pristis hamatus White, 1926
  - †Pristis ingens Stromer, 1905
  - †Pristis lanceolatus Jonet, 1968
  - †Pristis lathami Galeotti, 1837
  - †Pristis lyceensis Vigliarolo, 1891
  - †Pristis malembeensis Dartevelle & Casier, 1943
  - †Pristis olbrechtsi Dartevelle & Casier, 1959
  - †Pristis pickeringi Case, 1981
  - †Pristis praecursor Casier, 1949
  - †Pristis propinquidens Casier, 1949
  - †Pristis recurvidens Chapman & Cudmore, 1924
- †Pristodus Davis, 1883
  - †Pristodus benniei Etheridge, 1875
  - †Pristodus concinnus Davis, 1883
  - †Pristodus falcatus Davis, 1883
- †Pristrisodus Bhat, Ray & Datta, 2018
  - †Pristrisodus tikiensis Prasad, Singh, Parmar, Goswami & Sudan, 2008
- †Procestracion Hovestadt, 2018
  - †Procestracion bidens (Quenstedt 1852)
  - †Procestracion semirugosus (Plieninger, 1847)
  - †Procestracion semirugosus (Quenstedt 1852)
- †Proetmopterus Siverson, 1993
  - †Proetmopterus hemmooriensis Herman, 1982
- †Prohaploblepharus Underwood & Ward, 2008
  - †Prohaploblepharus riegrafi Müller, 1989
- †Proheterodontus Underwood & Ward, 2004
  - †Proheterodontus sylvestris Underwood & Ward, 2004
- †Promexyele Zangerl & Case, 1973
  - †Promexyele bairdi Zangerl & Case, 1973
  - †Promexyele peyeri Zangerl & Case, 1973
- †Promyliobatis Jaekel, 1894
  - †Promyliobatis gazolai De Zigno, 1882
- †Propristiophorus Woodward, 1932
  - †Propristiophorus tumidens Woodward, 1932
- †Propristis Dames, 1883
  - †Propristis mayumbensis Dartevelle & Casier, 1943
  - †Propristis schweinfurthi Dames, 1883
- †Prosopodon Noubhani & Cappetta, 1995
  - †Prosopodon assafai Noubhani & Cappetta, 1995
- †Protacrodus Jaekel, 1921
  - †Protacrodus aequalis Ivanov, 1996
  - †Protacrodus orientalis Li, 1988
  - †Protacrodus serra Ginter, Hairapetian & Klug, 2002
  - †Protacrodus sibiricus Lebedev, 2001
  - †Protacrodus vetustus Jaekel, 1925
  - †Protacrodus wellsi Gross, 1973
- †Proteothrinax Pfeil, 2012
  - †Proteothrinax baumgartneri Pfeil, 1983
- †Protocentrophorus Adnet, Cappetta & Mertiniene, 2008
  - †Protocentrophorus balticus Dalinkevicius, 1935
  - †Protocentrophorus steviae Cappetta, Morrison & Adnet, 2019
- †Protodus Woodward, 1892
  - †Protodus jexi Woodward, 1892
- †Protoginglymostoma Herman, 1977
  - †Protoginglymostoma ypresiensis Casier, 1946
- †Protoheptranchias Cappetta, Morrison & Adnet, 2019
  - †Protoheptranchias lowei Cappetta, Morrison & Adnet, 2019
- †Protoheterodontus Hovestadt, 2018
  - †Protoheterodontus boussioni (Guinot, Underwood, Cappetta & Ward, 2013)
- †Protohimantura Marramà, Klug, de Vos & Kriwet, 2018
  - †Protohimantura vorstmani de Beaufort, 1926
- †Protolamna Cappetta, 1980
  - †Protolamna acuta Müller & Diedrich, 1991
  - †Protolamna borodini Cappetta & Case, 1975
  - †Protolamna carteri Cappetta & Case, 1999
  - †Protolamna ricaurtensis Carrillo-Briceño, Parra & Luque, 2019
  - †Protolamna roanokeensis Cappetta & Case, 1999
  - †Protolamna sarstedtensis Schmitz, Thies & Kriwet, 2010
  - †Protolamna sokolovi Cappetta, 1980
- †Protoplatyrhina Case, 1978
  - †Protoplatyrhina hopii Williamson, Kirkland & Lucas, 1993
  - †Protoplatyrhina renae Case, 1978
- †Protoscapanorhynchus Glikman, 1980
  - †Protoscapanorhynchus eorhaphiodon Glikman, 1980
- †Protoscyliorhinus Herman, 1977
  - †Protoscyliorhinus bettrechiensis Herman, 1977
  - †Protoscyliorhinus lamaudi Biddle & Landemaine, 1988
  - †Protoscyliorhinus magnus Landemaine, 1991
- †Protospinax Woodward, 1918
  - †Protospinax annectans Woodward, 1918
  - †Protospinax bilobatus Underwood & Ward, 2004
  - †Protospinax carvalhoi Underwood & Ward, 2004
  - †Protospinax heterodon Underwood & Mitchell, 1999
  - †Protospinax lochensteinensis Thies, 1983
  - †Protospinax magnus Underwood & Ward, 2004
  - †Protospinax muftius Thies, 1983
  - †Protospinax planus Underwood, 2002
- †Protosqualus Cappetta, 1977
  - †Protosqualus albertsi Thies, 1981
  - †Protosqualus argentinensis Bogan, Agnolin & Novas, 2016
  - †Protosqualus barringtonensis Guinot, Underwood, Cappetta & Ward, 2013
  - †Protosqualus glickmani Averianov, 1997
  - †Protosqualus pachyrhiza Underwood & Mitchell, 1999
  - †Protosqualus sigei Cappetta, 1977
- †Protoxynotus Herman, 1975
  - †Protoxynotus misburgensis Herman, 1975
- †Psammodus Agassiz, 1838
  - †Psammodus cinctus Agassiz, 1843
  - †Psammodus contortus Anonymous author(s)
  - †Psammodus salopiensis Woodward, 1889
  - †Psammodus trapeziformis Davis, 1883
- †Psephodus Morris & Roberts, 1862
  - †Psephodus dubius Woodward, 1889
  - †Psephodus laevissimus Agassiz, 1843
  - †Psephodus magnus Agassiz, 1843
  - †Psephodus placenta Newberry & Worthen, 1866
  - †Psephodus reticularis St. John & Worthen, 1883
  - †Psephodus salopiensis Woodward, 1889
- †Pseudaetobatus Cappetta, 1986
  - †Pseudaetobatus belli Cicimurri & Ebersole, 2015
  - †Pseudaetobatus casieri Cappetta, 1986
  - †Pseudaetobatus undulatus Cicimurri & Ebersole, 2015
- †Pseudoapristurus Pollerspöck & Straube, 2017
  - †Pseudoapristurus nonstriatus Pollerspöck & Straube, 2017
- **Pseudocarcharias** Cadenat, 1963
  - †Pseudocarcharias rigida Probst, 1879
- †Pseudocetorhinus Duffin, 1998
  - †Pseudocetorhinus pickfordi Duffin, 1998
- †Pseudocorax Priem, 1897
  - †Pseudocorax affinis Münster, 1843
  - †Pseudocorax duchaussoisi Guinot, Underwood, Cappetta & Ward, 2013
  - †Pseudocorax granti Cappetta & Case, 1975
  - †Pseudocorax laevis Leriche, 1906
- †Pseudodalatias Reif, 1978
  - †Pseudodalatias barnstonensis Sykes, 1971
  - †Pseudodalatias henarejensis Botella, Plasencia, Marquez-Aliaga, Cuny & Dorka, 2009
- †Pseudodontaspis Case, 1987
  - †Pseudodontaspis herbsti Case, 1987
- †Pseudoechinorhinus Pfeil, 1983
  - †Pseudoechinorhinus mackinnoni Pfeil, 1983
- **Pseudoginglymostoma** Dingerkus, 1986
  - †Pseudoginglymostoma erguitaense Noubhani & Cappetta, 1997
  - †Pseudoginglymostoma idiri Noubhani & Cappetta, 1997
- †Pseudoheterodontus Glückman & Zhelezko 1971
  - †Pseudoheterodontus polydictus Glückman & Zhelezko 1971
- †Pseudohypolophus Cappetta & Case, 1975
  - †Pseudohypolophus ellipsis Case, Schwimmer, Borodin & Leggett, 2001
  - †Pseudohypolophus elongatus Mustafa, Case & Zalmout, 2002
- †Pseudoisurus Glikman, 1957
  - †Pseudoisurus sulukapensis Zhelezko, 2000
- †Pseudomegachasma Shimada, Popov, Siversson, Welton & Long, 2015
  - †Pseudomegachasma casei Nessov, 1999
  - †Pseudomegachasma comanchensis Shimada, 2007
- †Pseudomyledaphus Kirkland, Eaton & Brinkman, 2013
  - †Pseudomyledaphus madseni Kirkland, Eaton & Brinkman, 2013
- †Pseudonotidanus Underwood & Ward, 2004
  - †Pseudonotidanus semirugosus Underwood & Ward, 2004
- †Pseudoplatyrhina Guinot, Cappetta, Underwood & Ward, 2012
  - †Pseudoplatyrhina crispa Guinot, Cappetta, Underwood & Ward, 2012
- †Pseudorhina Jaekel, 1898
  - †Pseudorhina acanthoderma Fraas, 1854
  - †Pseudorhina alifera Münster, 1842
  - †Pseudorhina crocheti Guinot, Cappetta & Adnet, 2014
  - †Pseudorhina frequens Underwood, 2002
- †Pseudorhinobatos Marramà, Carnevale, Naylor, Varese, Giusberti & Kriwet, 2020
  - †Pseudorhinobatos dezignii Heckel, 1853
- †Pseudoscapanorhynchus Herman, 1977
  - †Pseudoscapanorhynchus compressidens Herman, 1977
- †Pseudoscyliorhinus Müller & Diedrich, 1991
  - †Pseudoscyliorhinus reussi Herman, 1977
  - †Pseudoscyliorhinus schwarzhansi Müller & Diedrich, 1991
- †Pseudospinax Müller & Diedrich, 1991
  - †Pseudospinax pusillus Müller & Diedrich, 1991
- †Pteroscyllium Cappetta, 1980
  - †Pteroscyllium dubertreti Cappetta, 1980
  - †Pteroscyllium hermani Underwood & Ward, 2008
  - †Pteroscyllium lamranii Noubhani & Cappetta, 1997
  - †Pteroscyllium ornatum Underwood & Mitchell, 1999
  - †Pteroscyllium signeuxi Cappetta, 1980
  - †Pteroscyllium speetonensis Underwood, 2004
- †Ptychocorax Glikman & Istchenko, 1980
  - †Ptychocorax hybodontoides Glikman, 1980
- †Ptychodus Agassiz, 1839
  - †Ptychodus acutus Agassiz, 1843
  - †Ptychodus agassizi Dixon, 1850
  - †Ptychodus altior Agassiz, 1843
  - †Ptychodus anonymus Williston, 1900
  - †Ptychodus arcuatus Agassiz, 1843
  - †Ptychodus articulatus Agassiz, 1843
  - †Ptychodus atcoensis Hamm & Cicimurri, 2011
  - †Ptychodus belluccii Bonarelli, 1898
  - †Ptychodus carapetiae Salinas, 1901
  - †Ptychodus catulloi Salinas, 1901
  - †Ptychodus chilisaensis Kozlov, 1999
  - †Ptychodus cyclodontis Mutter, Iturralde-Vinent & Fernandez Carmona, 2005
  - †Ptychodus decurrens Agassiz, 1839
    - †P. d. decurrens Agassiz, 1839
    - †P. d. hemidecurrens Herman, 1977
  - †Ptychodus dixoni Dibley, 1911
  - †Ptychodus gibberulus Agassiz, 1843
  - †Ptychodus granulosus Redlich, 1896
  - †Ptychodus janevaii Cope, 1874
  - †Ptychodus latissimus Agassiz, 1843
  - †Ptychodus levis Woodward, 1894
  - †Ptychodus mammillaris Agassiz, 1843
  - †Ptychodus martini Williston, 1900
  - †Ptychodus mediterraneus Canavari, 1916
  - †Ptychodus mortoni Mantell, 1836
  - †Ptychodus multiplicatus Leriche, 1902
  - †Ptychodus multistriatus Woodward, 1889
  - †Ptychodus occidentalis Leidy, 1868
  - †Ptychodus oweni Dixon, 1850
  - †Ptychodus papillosus Cope, 1875
  - †Ptychodus parvulus Whiteaves, 1889
  - †Ptychodus pauli Coquand, 1860
  - †Ptychodus polygyrus Agassiz, 1843
  - †Ptychodus rhombodus Underwood & Cumbaa, 2010
  - †Ptychodus rugosus Dixon, 1850
  - †Ptychodus spectabilis Agassiz, 1843
  - †Ptychodus whipplei Marcou, 1858
- †Ptychotrygon Jaekel, 1894
  - †Ptychotrygon agujaensis McNulty & Slaughter, 1972
  - †Ptychotrygon blainensis Case, 1978
  - †Ptychotrygon boothi Case, 1987
  - †Ptychotrygon chattahoocheensis Case, Schwimmer, Borodin & Leggett, 2001
  - †Ptychotrygon clementsi Case, Cook, Saford & Shannon, 2017
  - †Ptychotrygon cuspidata Cappetta & Case, 1975
  - †Ptychotrygon ellae Case, 1987
  - †Ptychotrygon eutawensis Case, Schwimmer, Borodin & Leggett, 2001
  - †Ptychotrygon geyeri Kriwet, 1999
  - †Ptychotrygon gueveli Cappetta, 2004
  - †Ptychotrygon henkeli Werner, 1989
  - †Ptychotrygon ledouxi Cappetta, 1973
  - †Ptychotrygon pustulata Kriwet, Nunn & Klug, 2009
  - †Ptychotrygon slaughteri Cappetta & Case, 1975
  - †Ptychotrygon striata Kriwet, Nunn & Klug, 2009
  - †Ptychotrygon texana Leriche, 1942
  - †Ptychotrygon triangularis Reuss, 1845
  - †Ptychotrygon vermiculata Cappetta, 1975
  - †Ptychotrygon winni Case & Cappetta, 1997
- †Ptychotrygonoides Landemaine, 1991
  - †Ptychotrygonoides hermani Bernardez, 2002
  - †Ptychotrygonoides herreroae Bernardez, 2002
  - †Ptychotrygonoides lamoldai Bernardez, 2002
  - †Ptychotrygonoides pouiti Landemaine, 1991
  - †Ptychotrygonoides sabatieri Guinot, Cappetta, Underwood & Ward, 2012
- †Ptyktoptychion Lees, 1986
  - †Ptyktoptychion tayyo Lees, 1986
  - †Ptyktoptychion wadeae Bartholomai, 2008
- †Pucabatis Cappetta, 1975
  - †Pucabatis hoffstetteri Cappetta, 1975
- †Pucapampella Janvier & Suarez-Riglos, 1986
  - †Pucapampella rodrigae Janvier & Suarez-Riglos, 1986
- †Pucapristis Schaeffer, 1963
  - †Pucapristis branisi Schaeffer, 1963
  - †Pucapristis standhardtae Williamson & Lucas, 1993
- †Pueblocarcharias Bourdon, Wright, Lucas, Spielmann & Pence, 2011
  - †Pueblocarcharias kawaikensis Bourdon, Wright, Lucas, Spielmann & Pence, 2011
- †Pyknotylacanthus Mutter & Rieber, 2005
  - †Pyknotylacanthus humboldtensis Davidson, 1919
  - †Pyknotylacanthus spathianus Mutter & Rieber, 2005

== R ==
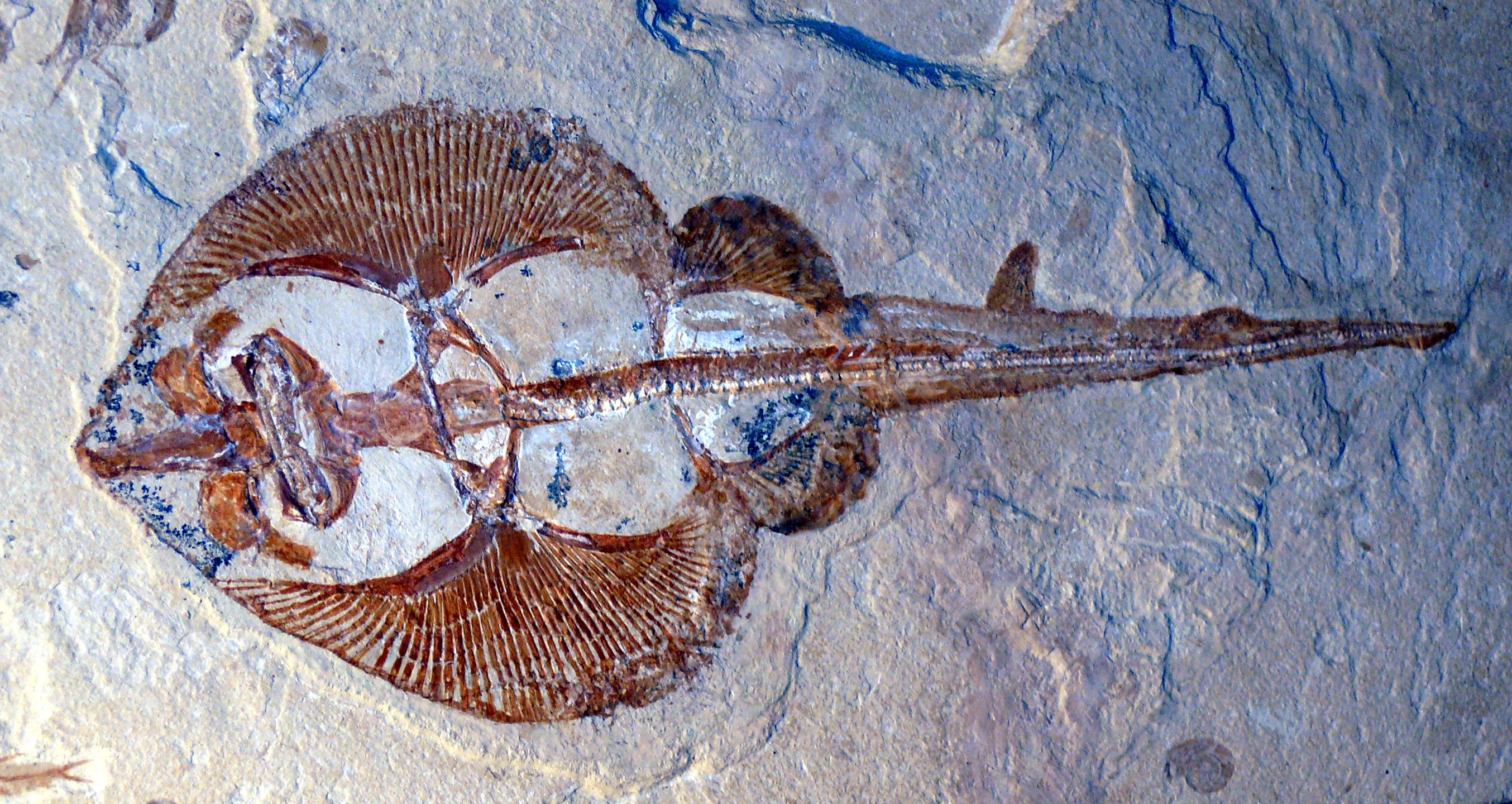
Rhinobatos whitfieldi

- †Raineria Osswald, 1929
  - †Raineria osswaldi Kühn, 1942
- †Rainerichthys Grogan & Lund, 2009
  - †Rainerichthys zangerli Grogan & Lund, 2009
- **Raja** Linnaeus, 1758
  - †Raja amphitrita Engelbrecht, Mörs, Reguero & Kriwet, 2018
  - †Raja antiqua Agassiz, 1843
  - †Raja borussica Noetling, 1885
  - †Raja davisi Fowler, 1958
  - †Raja farishi Case & Cappetta, 1997
  - †Raja gentili Joleaud, 1912
  - †Raja harrisae Ward, 1984
  - †Raja holsatica Reinecke, Von der Hocht & Gürs, 2008
  - †Raja louisi Cappetta, 1972
  - †Raja manitaria Engelbrecht, Mörs, Reguero & Kriwet, 2018
  - †Raja marandati Adnet, 2006
  - †Raja mccollumi Cicimurri & Knight, 2010
  - †Raja michauxi Adnet, 2006
  - †Raja minor Davis, 1887
  - †Raja olisiponensis Jonet, 1968
  - †Raja ornata Agassiz, 1843
  - †Raja philippi Münster, 1846
  - †Raja similis Woodward, 1889
  - †Raja suboxyrhynchus Lawley, 1876
  - †Raja sudhakari Prasad & Cappetta, 1993
  - †Raja thiedei Reinecke, 2015
- †Rajitheca Steininger, 1966
  - †Rajitheca bavarica Steininger, 1966
  - †Rajitheca grisigensis Steininger, 1966
  - †Rajitheca helvetica Fischer-Ooster, 1866
- †Recurvacanthus Duffin, 1981
  - †Recurvacanthus uniserialis Duffin, 1981
- †Reesodus Koot, Cuny, Tintori & Twitchett, 2013
  - †Reesodus pectinatus Lebedev, 1996
  - †Reesodus underwoodi Koot, Cuny, Tintori & Twitchett, 2013
  - †Reesodus wirksworthensis Duffin, 1985
- †Reginaselache Turner & Burrow, 2011
  - †Reginaselache morrisi Turner & Burrow, 2011
- †Reifia Duffin, 1980
  - †Reifia minuta Duffin, 1980
- †Renpetia Werner, 1989
  - †Renpetia labiicarinata Werner, 1989
- †Restesia Cook, Newbrey, Brinkman & Kirkland, 2014
  - †Restesia americana Estes, 1964
- †Reticulodus Murry & Kirby, 2002
  - †Reticulodus synergus Murry & Kirby, 2002
- †Rhaibodus Böhm, 1926
  - †Rhaibodus rapax Böhm, 1926
- **Rhinobatos** Linck, 1790
  - †Rhinobatos alaicus Averianov & Udovitshenko, 1993
  - †Rhinobatos antunesi Jonet, 1968
  - †Rhinobatos auribatensis Adnet, 2006
  - †Rhinobatos bruxelliensis Jaekel, 1894
  - †Rhinobatos casieri Herman, 1977
  - †Rhinobatos craddocki Case & Cappetta, 1997
  - †Rhinobatos echavei Cappetta & Corral, 1999
  - †Rhinobatos gonzaloi Bernardez, 2002
  - †Rhinobatos grandis Davis, 1887
  - †Rhinobatos hakelensis Cappetta, 1980
  - †Rhinobatos ibericus Cappetta & Corral, 1999
  - †Rhinobatos incertus Cappetta, 1973
  - †Rhinobatos incidens Kriwet, 1999
  - †Rhinobatos intermedius Davis, 1887
  - †Rhinobatos kiestensis Cappetta & Case, 1999
  - †Rhinobatos ladoniaensis Cappetta & Case, 1999
  - †Rhinobatos latus Davis, 1887
  - †Rhinobatos lobatus Cappetta & Case, 1999
  - †Rhinobatos mariannae Bor, 1983
  - †Rhinobatos maronita Pictet & Humbert, 1866
  - †Rhinobatos matzensis Baut & Genault, 1995
  - †Rhinobatos picteti Cappetta, 1975
  - †Rhinobatos sahnii Sahni & Mehrotra, 1981
  - †Rhinobatos seruensis Guinot, Cappetta, Underwood & Ward, 2012
  - †Rhinobatos sotoi Bernardez, 2002
  - †Rhinobatos steurbauti Cappetta & Nolf, 1981
  - †Rhinobatos tenuirostris Davis, 1887
  - †Rhinobatos tesselatus Von Der Marck, 1894
  - †Rhinobatos uvulatus Case & Cappetta, 1997
  - †Rhinobatos whitfieldi Hay, 1903
- **Rhinochimaera** Garman, 1901
  - †Rhinochimaera arenicola Vosin, 1968
  - †Rhinochimaera caucasica Obruchev, 1967
- †Rhinognathus Davis, 1887
  - †Rhinognathus lewisii Davis, 1887
- **Rhinoptera** van Hasselt, 1824
  - †Rhinoptera prisca Woodward, 1907
  - †Rhinoptera raeburni White, 1934
  - †Rhinoptera rasilis Böhm, 1926
  - †Rhinoptera schultzi Hiden, 1995
  - †Rhinoptera sherborni White, 1926
  - †Rhinoptera smithii Jordan & Beal, 1913
  - †Rhinoptera studeri Agassiz, 1843
  - †Rhinoptera woodwardi Agassiz, 1843
- †Rhizochlatrus Silva Santos & Travassos, 1960
  - †Rhizochlatrus vidalis Silva Santos & Travassos, 1960
- **Rhizoprionodon** Whitley, 1929
  - †Rhizoprionodon bisulcatus Li, 1995
  - †Rhizoprionodon crenidens Klunzinger, 1879
  - †Rhizoprionodon fischeuri Joleaud, 1912
  - †Rhizoprionodon ganntourensis Arambourg, 1952
  - †Rhizoprionodon taxandriae Leriche, 1926
- †Rhizoquadrangulus Baut & Genault, 1999
  - †Rhizoquadrangulus rupeliensis Le Hon, 1871
- †Rhomaleodus Andreev & Cuny, 2012
  - †Rhomaleodus budurovi Andreev & Cuny, 2012
- †Rhombodus Dames, 1881
  - †Rhombodus andriesi Noubhani & Cappetta, 1994
  - †Rhombodus binkhorsti Dames, 1881
  - †Rhombodus carentonensis Vullo, 2005
  - †Rhombodus ibericus Kriwet, Soler-Gijón & López-Martínez, 2007
  - †Rhombodus levis Cappetta & Case, 1975
  - †Rhombodus meridionalis Arambourg, 1952
  - †Rhombodus microdon Arambourg, 1952
- †Rhombopterygia Cappetta, 1980
  - †Rhombopterygia chaconae Bernardez, 2002
  - †Rhombopterygia rajoides Cappetta, 1980
  - †Rhombopterygia villae Bernardez, 2002
  - †Rhombopterygia zaborskii Vullo & Courville, 2014
- †Rhomphaiodon Duffin, 1993
  - †Rhomphaiodon minor Agassiz, 1837
  - †Rhomphaiodon nicolensis Duffin, 1993
- **Rhynchobatus** Müller & Henle, 1837
  - †Rhynchobatus pristinus Probst, 1877
  - †Rhynchobatus rudolffischeri Laurito Mora, 1999
  - †Rhynchobatus vincenti Jaekel, 1894
- †Rolfodon Cappetta, Morrison & Adnet, 2019
  - †Rolfodon bracheri Pfeil, 1983
  - †Rolfodon fiedleri Pfeil, 1983
  - †Rolfodon goliath Antunes & Cappetta, 2002
  - †Rolfodon keyesi Mannering & Hiller, 2008
  - †Rolfodon landinii Carrillo-Briceño, Aguilera & Rodriguez, 2014
  - †Rolfodon ludvigseni Cappetta, Morrison & Adnet, 2019
  - †Rolfodon tatere Consoli, 2008
  - †Rolfodon thomsoni Richter & Ward, 1990
- †Romerodus Zangerl, 1981
  - †Romerodus orodontus Zangerl, 1981
- †Roongodus Hairapetian & Ginter, 2009
  - †Roongodus phijani Hairapetian & Ginter, 2009
- †Roulletia Vullo, Cappetta & Néraudeau, 2007
  - †Roulletia bureaui Vullo, Cappetta & Néraudeau, 2007
  - †Roulletia canadensis Underwood & Cumbaa, 2010
- †Rubencanthus Figueroa & Gallo, 2017
  - †Rubencanthus diplotuberculatus Figueroa & Gallo, 2017
- †Rugosicorona Johns, Barnes & Orchard, 1997
  - †Rugosicorona circacarina Zhang, Chen, Cheng & Zhang, 2012

== S ==
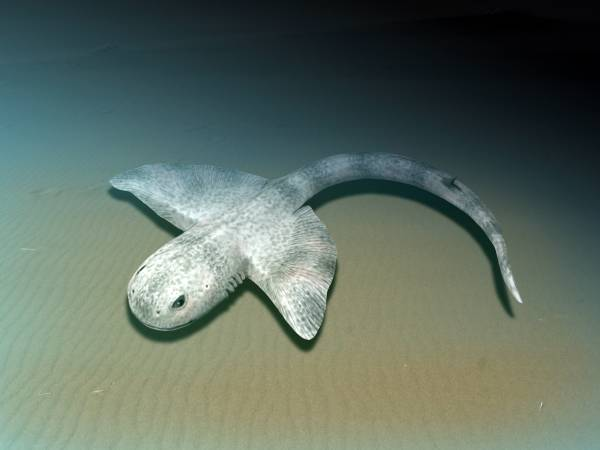
Life reconstruction of Squatinactis caudispinatus

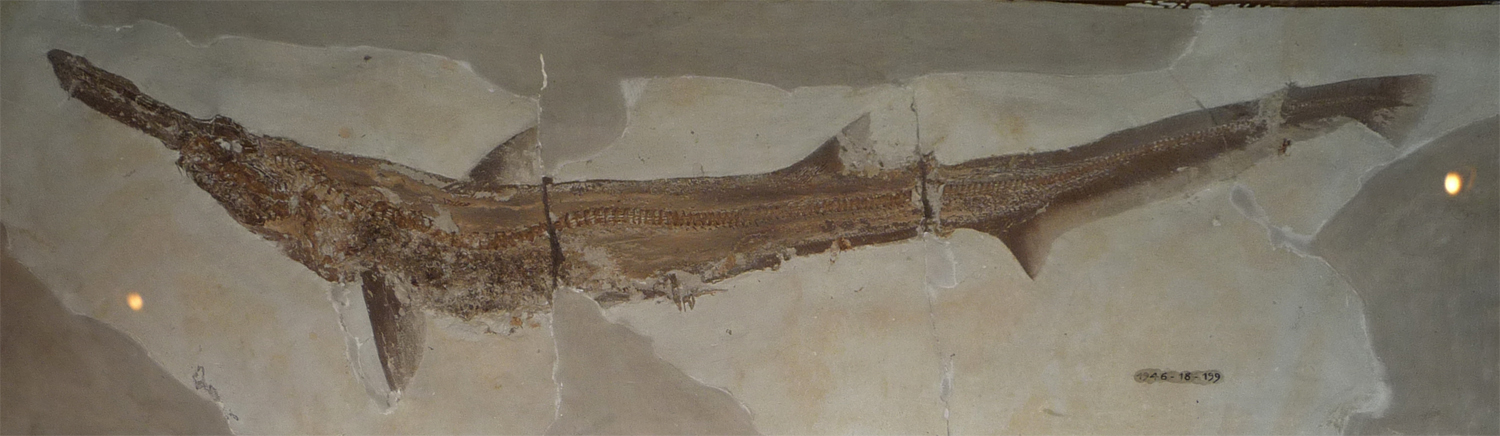
Scapanorhynchus lewisii

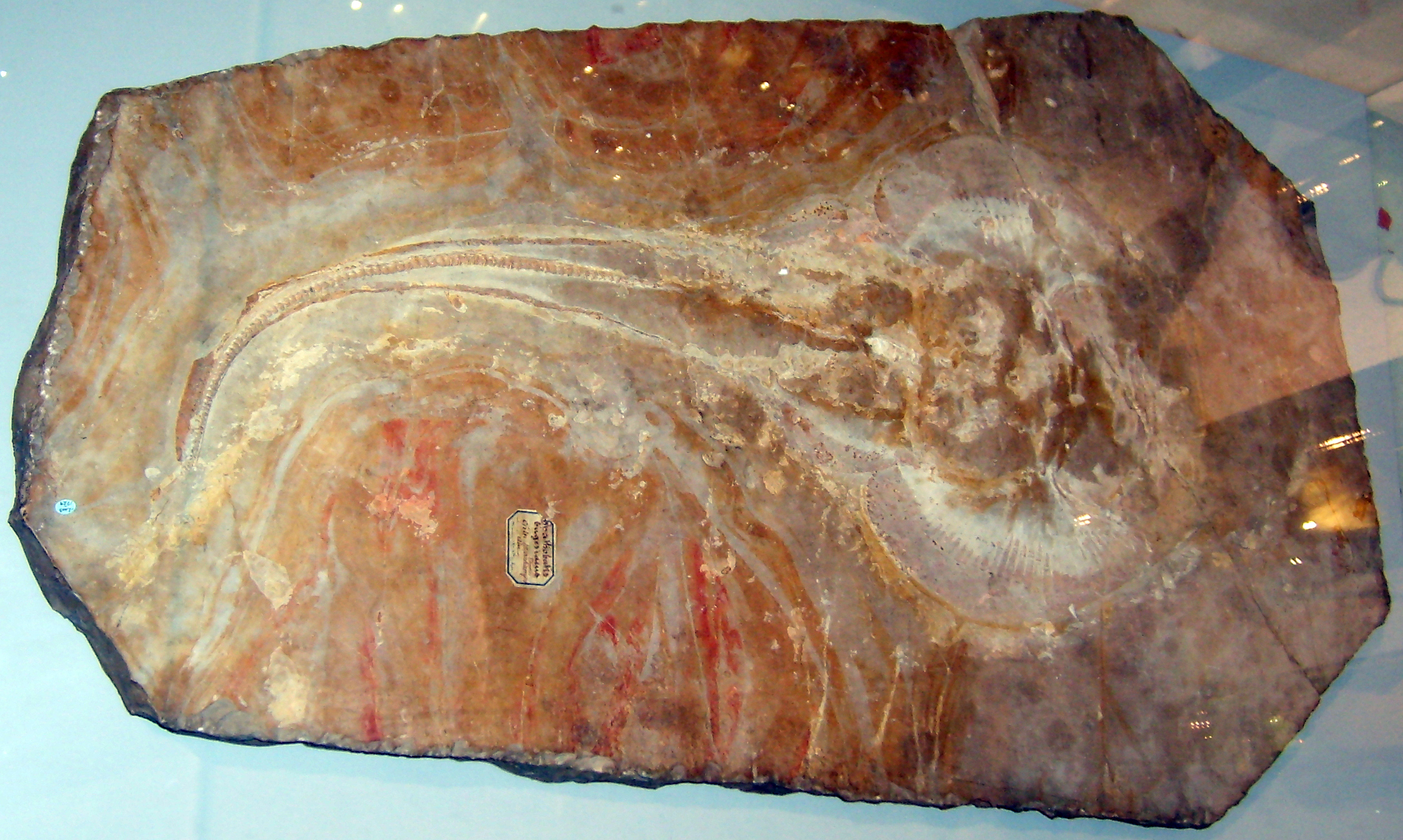
Spathobatis bugesiacus

- †Safagaia Cappetta, 1991
  - †Safagaia ptychodon Cappetta, 1991
- †Safrodus Koot & Cuny, 2015
  - †Safrodus tozeri Koot & Cuny, 2015
- †Saivodus Duffin & Ginter, 2006
  - †Saivodus striatus Agassiz, 1843
- †Saltirius Cook, Eaton, Newbrey & Wilson, 2014
  - †Saltirius utahensis Cook, Eaton, Newbrey & Wilson, 2014
- †Sandalodus Newberry & Worthen, 1866
  - †Sandalodus complanatus Newberry & Worthen, 1866
  - †Sandalodus crassus Newberry & Worthen, 1866
- †Sarcoprion Nielsen, 1952
  - †Sarcoprion edax Nielsen, 1952
- †Sarisubcorona Johns, 1997
  - †Sarisubcorona circabasis Johns, Barnes & Orchard, 1997
- †Scapanorhynchus Woodward, 1889
  - †Scapanorhynchus aciculus Ameghino, 1935
  - †Scapanorhynchus armenicus Glikman, 1980
  - †Scapanorhynchus baghensis Verma, 1965
  - †Scapanorhynchus darvasicus Glikman, 1980
  - †Scapanorhynchus denticulatus Ameghino, 1935
  - †Scapanorhynchus kysylkumensis Sokolov, 1978
  - †Scapanorhynchus lewisii Davis, 1887
  - †Scapanorhynchus lissus Ameghino, 1906
  - †Scapanorhynchus minimus Landemaine, 1991
  - †Scapanorhynchus minor Ameghino, 1935
  - †Scapanorhynchus perssoni Siverson, 1992
  - †Scapanorhynchus praeraphiodon Sokolov, 1978
  - †Scapanorhynchus puercoensis Bourdon, Wright, Lucas, Spielmann & Pence, 2011
  - †Scapanorhynchus rapax Quaas, 1902
  - †Scapanorhynchus rhaphiodon Agassiz, 1843
    - †S. r. rhaphiodon Agassiz, 1843
    - †S. r. zambiensis Dartevelle & Casier, 1959
  - †Scapanorhynchus semistriatus Ameghino, 1935
  - †Scapanorhynchus subulatus Agassiz, 1843
  - †Scapanorhynchus temiricus Zhelezko, 1987
  - †Scapanorhynchus texanus Roemer, 1849
  - †Scapanorhynchus tricarinatus Ameghino, 1935
- †Schizorhiza Weiler, 1930
  - †Schizorhiza stromeri Weiler, 1930
  - †Schizorhiza weileri Serra, 1933
- †Scindocorax Bourdon, Wright, Lucas, Spielmann & Pence, 2011
  - †Scindocorax novimexicanus Bourdon, Wright, Lucas, Spielmann & Pence, 2011
- †Sclerorhynchus Woodward, 1889
  - †Sclerorhynchus atavus Woodward, 1889
  - †Sclerorhynchus fanninensis Cappetta & Case, 1999
  - †Sclerorhynchus pettersi Case & Cappetta, 1997
  - †Sclerorhynchus priscus Cappetta & Case, 1999
- **Scoliodon** Müller & Henle, 1837
  - †Scoliodon alae Sahni & Mehrotra, 1981
  - †Scoliodon conecuhensis Cappetta & Case, 2016
  - †Scoliodon eocenus Averianov & Udovitshenko, 1993
- †Scoliorhiza Raymond, 1925
  - †Scoliorhiza kellyi Raymond, 1925
- †Scyliorhinotheca Kiel, Peckmann & Simon, 2013
  - †Scyliorhinotheca goederti Kiel, Peckmann & Simon, 2013
- **Scyliorhinus** Blainville, 1816
  - †Scyliorhinus ambliatlanticus Lautiro Mora, 1999
  - †Scyliorhinus angustus Münster, 1843
  - †Scyliorhinus antiquus Agassiz, 1843
  - †Scyliorhinus arambourgi Cappetta, 1980
  - †Scyliorhinus arlingtonensis Cappetta & Case, 1999
  - †Scyliorhinus biddlei Halter, 1995
  - †Scyliorhinus biformis Reinecke, 2014
  - †Scyliorhinus bloti Cappetta, 1980
  - †Scyliorhinus brumarivulensis Underwood & Ward, 2008
  - †Scyliorhinus cepaeformis Halter, 1990
  - †Scyliorhinus coupatezi Herman, 1974
  - †Scyliorhinus dubius Woodward, 1889
  - †Scyliorhinus elongatus Davis, 1887
  - †Scyliorhinus entomodon Noubhani & Cappetta, 1997
  - †Scyliorhinus fossilis Leriche, 1927
  - †Scyliorhinus ivagrantae Case & Cappetta, 1997
  - †Scyliorhinus joleaudi Cappetta, 1970
  - †Scyliorhinus kannenbergi Leder, 2015
  - †Scyliorhinus kasenoi Karasawa, 1989
  - †Scyliorhinus luypaertsi Halter, 1995
  - †Scyliorhinus malembeensis Dartevelle & Casier, 1959
  - †Scyliorhinus monsaugustus Guinot, Underwood, Cappetta & Ward, 2013
  - †Scyliorhinus moosi Herman, 1975
  - †Scyliorhinus muelleri Guinot, Underwood, Cappetta & Ward, 2013
  - †Scyliorhinus musteliformis Herman, 1977
  - †Scyliorhinus ptychtus Noubhani & Cappetta, 1997
  - †Scyliorhinus reyndersi Halter, 1995
  - †Scyliorhinus suelstorfensis Reinecke, 2014
  - †Scyliorhinus sulcidens Noubhani & Cappetta, 1997
  - †Scyliorhinus taylorensis Cappetta & Case, 1999
  - †Scyliorhinus tensleepensis Case, 1987
  - †Scyliorhinus trifolius Adnet, 2006
  - †Scyliorhinus wardi Halter, 1990
  - †Scyliorhinus woodwardi Cappetta, 1976
- **Scymnodalatias** Garrick, 1956
  - †Scymnodalatias cigalafulgosii Adnet, 2006
- †Sechmetia Werner, 1989
  - †Sechmetia aegyptiaca Stromer, 1927
- †Selachidea Quenstedt 1852
  - †Selachidea torolosi Quenstedt 1852
- †Seretolepis Karatajute-Talimaa, 1968
  - †Seretolepis elegans Karatajute-Talimaa, 1968
- †Serratocorona Chen, 2002
  - †Serratocorona halberdiforme Chen, 2002
- †Serratolamna Landemaine, 1991
  - †Serratolamna africana Dartevelle & Casier, 1943
  - †Serratolamna caraibaea Leriche, 1938
  - †Serratolamna khderii Zalmout & Mustafa, 2001
  - †Serratolamna serrata Agassiz, 1843
- †Siamodus Long, 1990
  - †Siamodus janvieri Long, 1990
- †Siberiodus Ivanov & Rodina, 2004
  - †Siberiodus mirabilis Ivanov & Rodina, 2004
- †Sibyrhynchus Zangerl & Case, 1973
  - †Sibyrhynchus denisoni Zangerl & Case, 1973
- †Sigmoscyllium Guinot, Underwood, Cappetta & Ward, 2013
  - †Sigmoscyllium acuspidatum Guinot, Underwood, Cappetta & Ward, 2013
  - †Sigmoscyllium striatum Underwood & Ward, 2008
- †Siksika Lund, 1989
  - †Siksika ottae Lund, 1989
- †Similihariotta Zangerl, 1979
  - †Similihariotta dabasinskasi Zangerl, 1979
- †Similiteroscyllium Fuchs, Engelbrecht, Lukeneder & Kriwet, 2018
  - †Similiteroscyllium iniquus Fuchs, Engelbrecht, Lukeneder & Kriwet, 2018
  - †Similiteroscyllium rugasimulatum Guinot, Cappetta & Adnet, 2014
- †Sinacanthus P'An, 1959
  - †Sinacanthus boliviensis Gagnier, Turner, Friman, Suarez-Riglos & Janvier, 1988
  - †Sinacanthus triangulatus P'An & Liu, 1975
  - †Sinacanthus wuchangensis P'An, 1959
- †Sinacrodus Wang, Zhu, Jin & Wang, 2007
  - †Sinacrodus donglingensis Wang, Zhu, Jin & Wang, 2007
- †Sinohelicoprion Liu & Chang, 1963
  - †Sinohelicoprion macrodontus Lei, 1983
- †Smithraja Herman, 1986
  - †Smithraja forestensis Herman, 1986
- †Solenodus Trautschold, 1874
  - †Solenodus crenulatus Trautschold, 1874
- **Somniosus** Lesueur, 1818
  - †Somniosus gonzalezi Welton & Goedert, 2016
- †Spathobatis Thiollière, 1852
  - †Spathobatis bugesiacus Thiollière, 1852
  - †Spathobatis delsatei Underwood & Ward, 2004
  - †Spathobatis halteri Biddle & Landemaine, 1988
  - †Spathobatis morinicus Sauvage, 1873
  - †Spathobatis mutterlosei Thies, 1983
  - †Spathobatis rugosus Underwood, Mitchell & Veltkamp, 1999
  - †Spathobatis uppensis Thies, 1983
- †Sphenacanthus Agassiz, 1837
  - †Sphenacanthus aequistriatus Davis, 1879
  - †Sphenacanthus carbonarius Giebel, 1848
  - †Sphenacanthus delepinei Fournier & Pruvost, 1928
  - †Sphenacanthus depressus Newberry, 1897
  - †Sphenacanthus gondwanus Da Silva Santos, 1947
  - †Sphenacanthus ignis Figueroa & Gallo, 2017
  - †Sphenacanthus minor Davis, 1879
  - †Sphenacanthus nodosus Egerton, 1853
  - †Sphenacanthus riorastoensis Pauliv, Dias & Sedor, 2012
  - †Sphenacanthus sanpauloensis Chahud, Fairchild & Petri, 2010
  - †Sphenacanthus serrulatus Agassiz, 1843
  - †Sphenacanthus tenuis Ginter, 2016
  - †Sphenacanthus vicinalis Soler-Gijón, 1997
- †Sphenodus Agassiz, 1843
  - †Sphenodus alpinus Gümbel, 1861
  - †Sphenodus longidens Agassiz, 1843
  - †Sphenodus lundgreni Davis, 1890
  - †Sphenodus macer Quenstedt, 1852
  - †Sphenodus nitidus Wagner, 1862
  - †Sphenodus planus Agassiz, 1843
  - †Sphenodus rectidens Emmons, 1858
  - †Sphenodus robustidens Seguenza, 1900
  - †Sphenodus tithonius Gemmellaro, 1871
  - †Sphenodus virgai Gemmellaro, 1871
- †Sphenonchus Agassiz, 1843
  - †Sphenonchus hamatus Agassiz, 1843
- **Sphyrna** Rafinesque, 1810
  - †Sphyrna arambourgi Cappetta, 1970
  - †Sphyrna gibbesii Hay, 1902
  - †Sphyrna guinoti Adnet, Marivaux, Cappetta, Charruault, Essid, Jiquel, Ammar, Marandat, Marzougui, Merzeraud, Temani, Vianey-Liaud & Tabuce, 2020
  - †Sphyrna integra Probst, 1878
  - †Sphyrna laevissima Cope, 1867
  - †Sphyrna magna Cope, 1867
- †Sporetodus Cope, 1874
  - †Sporetodus janevaii Cope, 1874
- †Squalicorax Whitley, 1939
  - †Squalicorax acutus Siversson, Cook, Ryan, Watkins, Tatarnic, Downes & Newbrey, 2018
  - †Squalicorax africanus Cappetta, 1991
  - †Squalicorax appendiculatus Agassiz, 1839
  - †Squalicorax baharijensis Stromer, 1927
  - †Squalicorax bassanii Gemmellaro, 1920
  - †Squalicorax bazzii Siversson, Cook, Ryan, Watkins, Tatarnic, Downes & Newbrey, 2018
  - †Squalicorax benguerirensis Cappetta, Adnet, Akkrim & Amalik, 2014
  - †Squalicorax bernardezi Guinot, Underwood, Cappetta & Ward, 2013
  - †Squalicorax coquandi Vullo, Cappetta & Néraudeau, 2007
  - †Squalicorax curvatus Williston, 1900
  - †Squalicorax deckeri Bice & Shimada, 2016
  - †Squalicorax falcatus Agassiz, 1843
  - †Squalicorax heterodon Reuss, 1845
  - †Squalicorax kaupi Agassiz, 1843
  - †Squalicorax kugleri Leriche, 1938
  - †Squalicorax lalunaensis Guinot & Carrillo-Briceño, 2018
  - †Squalicorax lindstromi Davis, 1890
  - †Squalicorax microserratus Cappetta, Adnet, Akkrim & Amalik, 2014
  - †Squalicorax moodyi Guinot & Carrillo-Briceño, 2018
  - †Squalicorax mutabilis Siversson, Cook, Ryan, Watkins, Tatarnic, Downes & Newbrey, 2018
  - †Squalicorax primigenius Landemaine, 1991
  - †Squalicorax priscoserratus Siverson, Lindgren & Kelley, 2007
  - †Squalicorax pristodontus Agassiz, 1843
  - †Squalicorax sagisicus Glikman, 1980
  - †Squalicorax volgensis Glikman, 1971
  - †Squalicorax yangaensis Dartevelle & Casier, 1943
- †Squaliodalatias Adnet, Cappetta & Reynders, 2006
  - †Squaliodalatias savoiei Cappetta, Morrison & Adnet, 2019
  - †Squaliodalatias weltoni Adnet, 2000
- **Squaliolus** Smith & Radcliffe, 1912
  - †Squaliolus gasconensis Adnet, 2006
  - †Squaliolus schaubi Casier, 1958
- †Squaliomicrus Suzuki, 2015
  - †Squaliomicrus sanadaensis Suzuki, 2015
- †Squaloraja Riley, 1833
  - †Squaloraja polyspondyla Agassiz, 1843
- **Squalus** Linnaeus, 1758
  - †Squalus almeidae Antunes & Jonet, 1970
  - †Squalus alsaticus Andreae, 1892
  - †Squalus ballingsloevensis Siverson, 1993
  - †Squalus balsvikensis Siverson, 1993
  - †Squalus crenatidens Arambourg, 1952
  - †Squalus gabrielsoni Siverson, 1993
  - †Squalus huntensis Case & Cappetta, 1997
  - †Squalus minor Daimeries, 1888
  - †Squalus nicholsae Cappetta, Morrison & Adnet, 2019
  - †Squalus occidentalis Agassiz, 1856
  - †Squalus smithi Herman, 1982
  - †Squalus vondermarcki Müller & Schöllmann, 1989
  - †Squalus weltoni Long, 1992
  - †Squalus woodburnei Long, 1992
  - †Squalus worlandensis Case, 1987
- †Squatigaleus Cappetta, 1989
  - †Squatigaleus atlasi Cappetta, 1989
  - †Squatigaleus carinatus Cappetta, 1991
  - †Squatigaleus grandjeani Cappetta, 1991
  - †Squatigaleus sulphurensis Case & Cappetta, 1997
  - †Squatigaleus vianeyi Cappetta, 1989
- **Squatina** Duméril, 1806
  - †Squatina angeloides Van Beneden, 1873
  - †Squatina baumbergensis Von Der Marck, 1885
  - †Squatina beyrichi Noetling, 1885
  - †Squatina biforis Le Hon, 1871
  - †Squatina carinata Giebel, 1848
  - †Squatina cranei Woodward, 1888
  - †Squatina crassa Daimeries, 1889
  - †Squatina danconai Lawley, 1876
  - †Squatina decipiens Dalinkevicius, 1935
  - †Squatina fortemordeo Siversson, Cook, Cederström & Ryan, 2016
  - †Squatina gaudryi Priem, 1901
  - †Squatina gigantea Ameghino, 1906
  - †Squatina hassei Leriche, 1927
  - †Squatina lerichei Jordan & Beal, 1913
  - †Squatina lundegreni Siversson, Cook, Cederström & Ryan, 2016
  - †Squatina minor Eastman, 1911
  - †Squatina muelleri Reuss, 1846
  - †Squatina occidentalis Eastman, 1904
  - †Squatina prima Winkler, 1876
  - †Squatina speciosa Meyer, 1856
  - †Squatina subserrata Münster, 1846
- †Squatinactis Lund & Zangerl, 1974
  - †Squatinactis caudispinatus Lund & Zangerl, 1974
  - †Squatinactis glabrum Ginter, 1999
- †Squatirhina Casier, 1947
  - †Squatirhina draytoni Guinot, Cappetta, Underwood & Ward, 2012
  - †Squatirhina kannensis Herman, 1977
  - †Squatirhina lonzeensis Casier, 1947
  - †Squatirhina thiesi Biddle, 1993
  - †Squatirhina westfalica Müller & Diedrich, 1991
- †Squatiscyllium Cappetta, 1980
  - †Squatiscyllium casieri Arambourg, 1952
- †Srianta Lund & Grogan, 2004
  - †Srianta dawsoni Lund & Grogan, 2004
  - †Srianta iarlis Lund & Grogan, 2004
  - †Srianta srianta Lund & Grogan, 2004
- **Stegostoma** Müller & Henle, 1837
  - †Stegostoma tethysiensis Adnet, Marivaux, Cappetta, Charruault, Essid, Jiquel, Ammar, Marandat, Marzougui, Merzeraud, Temani, Vianey-Liaud & Tabuce, 2020
- †Steinbachodus Reif, 1980
  - †Steinbachodus estheriae Reif, 1980
- †Stenoscyllium Noubhani & Cappetta, 1997
  - †Stenoscyllium priemi Noubhani & Cappetta, 1997
- †Stethacanthulus Zangerl, 1990
  - †Stethacanthulus decorus Ivanov, 1999
  - †Stethacanthulus longipeniculus Zangerl, 1990
  - †Stethacanthulus meccaensis Williams, 1985
- †Stethacanthus Newberry, 1889
  - †Stethacanthus altonensis St. John & Worthen, 1875
  - †Stethacanthus gansuensis Wang, Jin & Wang, 2004
  - †Stethacanthus neilsoni Traquair, 1898
  - †Stethacanthus obtusus Trautschold, 1874
  - †Stethacanthus praecursor Hussakof & Bryant, 1918
  - †Stethacanthus resistens Ginter, 2002
  - †Stethacanthus thomasi Turner, 1982
- †Stoilodon Nessov & Averianov, 1996
  - †Stoilodon aenigma Nessov & Averianov, 1996
- †Streblodus Morris & Roberts, 1862
  - †Streblodus oblongus Agassiz, 1843
- †Striatolamia Glikman, 1964
  - †Striatolamia cederstroemi Siverson, 1995
  - †Striatolamia elegans Agassiz, 1843
    - †S. e. elegans Agassiz, 1843
    - †S. e. naja Zhelezko, 1999
  - †Striatolamia elongata Neugeboren, 1851
  - †Striatolamia macrota Agassiz, 1843
    - †S. m. asiatica Zhelezko, 1999
    - †S. m. evolutus Zhelezko, 1999
    - †S. m. macrota Agassiz, 1843
    - †S. m. paniseliensis Zhelezko, 1999
    - †S. m. prima Zhelezko, 1999
    - †S. m. usakensis Zhelezko, 1999
  - †Striatolamia rossica Glikman, 1964
    - †S. r. prima Glikman, 1964
    - †S. r. rossica Glikman, 1964
    - †S. r. usakensis Glikman, 1964
  - †Striatolamia sibirica Zhelezko, 1999
  - †Striatolamia striata Winkler, 1876
    - †S. s. embaensis Zhelezko, 1999
    - †S. s. junior Zhelezko, 1999
    - †S. s. orchiensis Zhelezko, 1999
    - †S. s. striata Winkler, 1876
  - †Striatolamia tchelkarnurensis Glikman, 1964
  - †Striatolamia whitei Arambourg, 1952
- †Strongyliscus Jordan 1925
  - †Strongyliscus robustus Jordan 1925
- †Sturgeonella Hansen, 1986
  - †Sturgeonella quinqueloba Gunnell, 1933
- †Subathunura Kumar & Loyal, 1987
  - †Subathunura casieri Kumar & Loyal, 1987
- †Sulcidens Underwood, Kolmann & Ward, 2017
  - †Sulcidens sulcidens (Dartevelle & Casier, 1943)
- †Surcaudalus Leu, 1989
  - †Surcaudalus rostratus Leu, 1989
- †Sylvestrilamia Cappetta & Nolf, 2005
  - †Sylvestrilamia teretidens White, 1931
- †Symmorium Cope, 1893
  - †Symmorium reniforme Cope, 1893
- †Synechodus Woodward, 1888
  - †Synechodus antiquus Ivanov, 2005
  - †Synechodus dereki Cappetta, Morrison & Adnet, 2019
  - †Synechodus dispar Reuss, 1846
  - †Synechodus dubrisiensis Mackie, 1863
  - †Synechodus duffini Underwood & Ward, 2004
  - †Synechodus faxensis Davis, 1890
  - †Synechodus filipi Siversson, Cook, Cederström & Ryan, 2016
  - †Synechodus hesbayensis Casier, 1943
  - †Synechodus lerichei Herman, 1977
  - †Synechodus levis Woodward, 1889
  - †Synechodus nitidus Woodward, 1911
  - †Synechodus paludinensis Delsate, Duffin & Weis, 2002
  - †Synechodus patagonicus Ameghino, 1893
  - †Synechodus perssoni Siverson, 1989
  - †Synechodus plicatus Underwood, 2002
  - †Synechodus prorogatus Kriwet, 2003
  - †Synechodus rhaeticus Duffin, 1982
  - †Synechodus seinstedtensis Thies, Vespermann & Solcher, 2014
  - †Synechodus streitzi Delsate, Duffin & Weis, 2002
  - †Synechodus subulatus Leriche, 1951
  - †Synechodus turneri Case, 1987
  - †Synechodus ungeri Klug, 2009
- †Syntomodus Obruchev, 1964
  - †Syntomodus abbreviatus Obruchev, 1964

== T ==
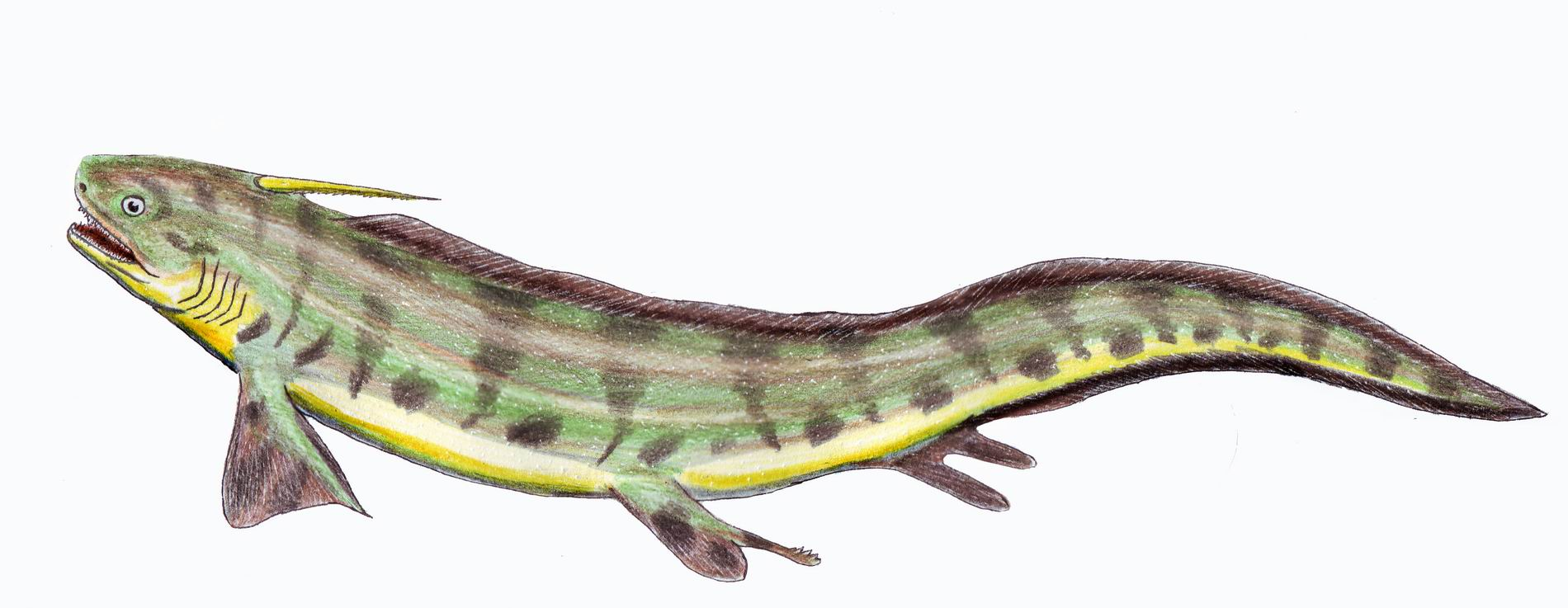
Triodus sessilis

- **Taeniurops** Garman, 1913
  - †Taeniurops cavernosus Probst, 1877
- †Tamiobatis Eastman, 1897
  - †Tamiobatis elgae Ivanov, 2018
  - †Tamiobatis succinctus St. John & Worthen, 1875
  - †Tamiobatis vetustus Eastman, 1897
  - †Tamiobatis wachsmuthi St. John & Worthen, 1875
- †Tanaodus St. John & Worthen, 1875
  - †Tanaodus bellicinctus St. John & Worthen, 1875
  - †Tanaodus depressius St. John & Worthen, 1875
  - †Tanaodus grossiplicatus St. John & Worthen, 1875
  - †Tanaodus multiplicatus Newberry & Worthen, 1866
  - †Tanaodus obscurus Leidy, 1857
  - †Tanaodus polymorphus St. John & Worthen, 1875
  - †Tanaodus pumilis St. John & Worthen, 1875
  - †Tanaodus scoticus Moy-Thomas, 1938
  - †Tanaodus sculptus St. John & Worthen, 1875
  - †Tanaodus sublunatus St. John & Worthen, 1875
  - †Tanaodus wisei Woodward, 1920
- †Tanoutia Noubhani & Cappetta, 1995
  - †Tanoutia iminensis Noubhani & Cappetta, 1995
- †Tantalepis Sansom, Davies, Coates, Nicoll & Ritchie, 2012
  - †Tantalepis gatehousei Sansom, Davies, Coates, Nicoll & Ritchie, 2012
- †Taquaralodus Chahud & Petri, 2010
  - †Taquaralodus albuquerquei Silva Santos, 1946
- †Tarimacanthus Min, 1998
  - †Tarimacanthus bachuensis Min, 1998
- †Tassiliodus Derycke & Goujet, 2011
  - †Tassiliodus lessardi Derycke & Goujet, 2011
- †Teresodus Koot, Cuny, Tintori & Twitchett, 2013
  - †Teresodus amplexus Koot, Cuny, Tintori & Twitchett, 2013
- †Tethybatis de Carvalho, 2004
  - †Tethybatis selachoides de Carvalho, 2004
- †Tethylamna Cappetta & Case, 2016
  - †Tethylamna dunni Cappetta & Case, 2016
  - †Tethylamna twiggsensis Case, 1981
- †Tethytrygon Marramà, Carnevale, Naylor & Kriwet, 2019
  - †Tethytrygon muricatus (Volta, 1796)
- †Texabatis Case & Cappetta, 1997
  - †Texabatis corrugata Case & Cappetta, 1997
- †Texasodus Ivanov, Nestell & Nestell, 2012
  - †Texasodus varidentatus Ivanov, Nestell & Nestell, 2012
- †Texatrygon Cappetta & Case, 1999
  - †Texatrygon avonicola Estes, 1964
  - †Texatrygon brycensis Kirkland, Eaton & Brinkman, 2013
  - †Texatrygon copei Cappetta & Case, 1999
  - †Texatrygon hooveri McNulty & Slaughter, 1972
  - †Texatrygon stouti Bourdon, Wright, Lucas, Spielmann & Pence, 2011
- †Tezakia Andreev, Coates, Shelton, Cooper, Smith & Sansom, 2015
  - †Tezakia hardingensis Andreev, Coates, Shelton, Cooper, Smith & Sansom, 2015
- †Thaiodus Cappetta, Buffetaut & Suteethorn, 1990
  - †Thaiodus ruchae Cappetta, Buffetaut & Suteethorn, 1990
- †Thiesus Guinot, Cappetta & Adnet, 2014
  - †Thiesus concavus Guinot, Cappetta & Adnet, 2014
- †Thrinacodus St. John & Worthen, 1875
  - †Thrinacodus bicuspidatus Ginter & Sun, 2007
  - †Thrinacodus duplicatus Newberry & Worthen, 1866
  - †Thrinacodus dziki Ginter, Duffin, Dean & Korn, 2015
  - †Thrinacodus ferox Turner, 1982
  - †Thrinacodus gracia Grogan & Lund, 2008
  - †Thrinacodus incurvus Newberry & Worthen, 1866
  - †Thrinacodus nanus St. John & Worthen, 1875
  - †Thrinacodus tranquillus Ginter, 2000
- †Tiaraju Richter, 2005
  - †Tiaraju tenuis Richter, 2007
- †Tikiodontus Bhat, Ray & Datta, 2018
  - †Tikiodontus asymmetricus Bhat, Ray & Datta, 2018
- †Tingaleus Cappetta, 1993
  - †Tingaleus dakkai Cappetta, 1993
- †Tingitanius Claeson, Underwood & Ward, 2013
  - †Tingitanius tenuimandibulus Claeson, Underwood & Ward, 2013
- †Titanonarke de Carvalho, 2010
  - †Titanonarke molini Jaekel, 1894
- †Tobolamna Zhelezko, 1999
  - †Tobolamna levinae Zhelezko, 1999
  - †Tobolamna tobolensis Zhelezko, 1999
- †Tomewingia Case & Cappetta, 2013
  - †Tomewingia problematica Case & Cappetta, 1997
- **Torpedo** Houttuyn, 1764
  - †Torpedo acarinata Adnet, 2006
  - †Torpedo chattica Reinecke, 2015
  - †Torpedo dormaalensis Smith, 1999
  - †Torpedo pessanti Adnet, 2006
- †Toxoprion Hay, 1909
  - †Toxoprion lecontei Dean, 1897
- †Traquairius Lund & Grogan, 1997
  - †Traquairius nudus Lund & Grogan, 1997
- **Triaenodon** Müller & Henle, 1837
  - †Triaenodon willei Herman & Van Den Eeckhaut, 2010
- **Triakis** Müller & Henle, 1838
  - †Triakis antunesi Noubhani & Cappetta, 1997
  - †Triakis beali Jordan & Gilbert, 1919
  - †Triakis chalossensis Adnet, 2006
  - †Triakis kelleri Hovestadt & Hovestadt-Euler, 2002
  - †Triakis muelleri Leder, 2013
  - †Triakis rutimeyeri Casier, 1958
  - †Triakis tanoutensis Noubhani & Cappetta, 1997
  - †Triakis wardi Cappetta, 1976
- †Tribodus Brito & Ferreira, 1989
  - †Tribodus limae Brito & Ferreira, 1989
  - †Tribodus morlati Landemaine, 1991
  - †Tribodus tunisiensis Cuny, Ouaja, Srarfi, Schmitz, Buffetaut & Benton, 2004
- †Trigonodus Winkler, 1876
  - †Trigonodus primus Winkler, 1876
- †Trigonotodus Kozlov, 1999
  - †Trigonotodus alteri Kozlov, 2001
  - †Trigonotodus tusbairicus Kozlov, 1999
- †Triodus Jordan, 1849
  - †Triodus carinatus Fritsch, 1890
  - †Triodus elpia Johnson & Thayer, 2010
  - †Triodus frossardi Gaudry, 1883
  - †Triodus kraetschmeri Hampe, 1989
  - †Triodus lauterensis Hampe, 1989
  - †Triodus obscurus Hampe, 1989
  - †Triodus palatinus Hampe, 1989
  - †Triodus pulchellus Davis, 1880
  - †Triodus richterae Pauliv, Martinelli, Francischini, Dentzien-Dias, Soares, Schultz & Ribeiro, 2017
  - †Triodus serratus Davis, 1892
  - †Triodus sessilis Jordan, 1849
  - †Triodus teberdaensis Hampe & Ivanov, 2007
- †Tristychius Agassiz, 1837
  - †Tristychius arcuatus Agassiz, 1843
  - †Tristychius minor Portlock, 1843
  - †Tristychius semistriatus Traquair, 1894
- †Truyolsodontos Bernardez, 2018
  - †Truyolsodontos estauni Bernardez, 2018
- †Tuberospina Lebedev, 1995
  - †Tuberospina nataliae Lebedev, 1995
- †Tubulacanthus Fritsch, 1889
  - †Tubulacanthus sulcatus Fritsch, 1889
- †Turania Kozlov, 2001
  - †Turania andrusovi Kozlov, 2001
- †Turnovichthys Štamberg, 2001
  - †Turnovichthys magnus Štamberg, 2001
- †Turoniabatis Landemaine, 1991
  - †Turoniabatis cappettai Landemaine, 1991
- †Tuvalepis Zigaite & Karatajute-Talimaa, 2008
  - †Tuvalepis schultzei Zigaite & Karatajute-Talimaa, 2008

== U ==
- †Uralodus Kozlov, 2000
  - †Uralodus zangerli Kozlov, 2000
- **Urobatis** Garman, 1913
  - †Urobatis molleni Hovestadt & Hovestadt-Euler, 2010
  - †Urobatis sloani Blainville, 1816
- **Urolophus** Müller & Henle, 1837
  - †Urolophus bicuneatus Noetling, 1885
- †Usakias Zhelezko & Kozlov, 1999
  - †Usakias wardi Zhelezko & Kozlov, 1999
    - †U. w. gracilis Zhelezko & Kozlov, 1999
    - †U. w. schorymensis Zhelezko & Kozlov, 1999
    - †U. w. wardi Zhelezko & Kozlov, 1999

== V ==
- †Vallisia Duffin, 1982
  - †Vallisia coppi Duffin, 1982
- †Vascobatis Cappetta & Corral, 1999
  - †Vascobatis albaitensis Cappetta & Corral, 1999
- †Vectiselachos Rees & Underwood, 2002
  - †Vectiselachos gosslingi Batchelor, 2013
  - †Vectiselachos ornatus Woodward, 1889
- †Venustodus St. John & Worthen, 1875
  - †Venustodus arcuatus Lebedev, 2001
- †Vetacapsula Mackie, 1867
  - †Vetacapsula cooperi Mackie & Crocker, 1865
  - †Vetacapsula kidstoni Crookall, 1928
  - †Vetacapsula moyseyi Crookall, 1928
- †Viperecucullus Case, 1996
  - †Viperecucullus kuehnei Case, 1996

== W ==
- †Walteraja Siverson & Cappetta, 2001
  - †Walteraja exigua Siverson & Cappetta, 2001
- †Washakiebatis Zeigler, Lucas & Heckert, 2005
  - †Washakiebatis kirklandi Zeigler, Lucas & Heckert, 2005
- †Weissobatis Hovestadt & Hovestadt-Euler, 1999
  - †Weissobatis micklichi Hovestadt & Hovestadt-Euler, 1999
- †Welcommia Cappetta, 1990
  - †Welcommia bodeuri Cappetta, 1990
  - †Welcommia cappettai Klug & Kriwet, 2010
- †Wellerodus Turner, 1997
  - †Wellerodus priscus Eastman, 1899
  - †Wellerodus wellsi Turner, 1997
- †Weltonia Ward, 1979
  - †Weltonia ancistrodon Arambourg, 1952
  - †Weltonia burnhamensis Ward, 1979
- †Whitropus Richards, Sherwin, Smithson, Bennion, Davies, Marshall & Clack, 2018
  - †Whitropus longicalcus Richards, Sherwin, Smithson, Bennion, Davies, Marshall & Clack, 2018
- †Wodnika Münster, 1843
  - †Wodnika borealis Maisey, 1982
  - †Wodnika striatula Münster, 1843
- †Woellsteinia Reinecke, Stapf & Raisch, 2001
  - †Woellsteinia kozlovi Adnet, 2006
  - †Woellsteinia oligocaena Reinecke, Stapf & Raisch, 2001
- †Wurdigneria Richter, 2005
  - †Wurdigneria obliterata Richter, 2005
  - †Wurdigneria pricei Würdig-Maciel, 1975
  - †Wurdigneria santosi Würdig-Maciel, 1975

== X ==
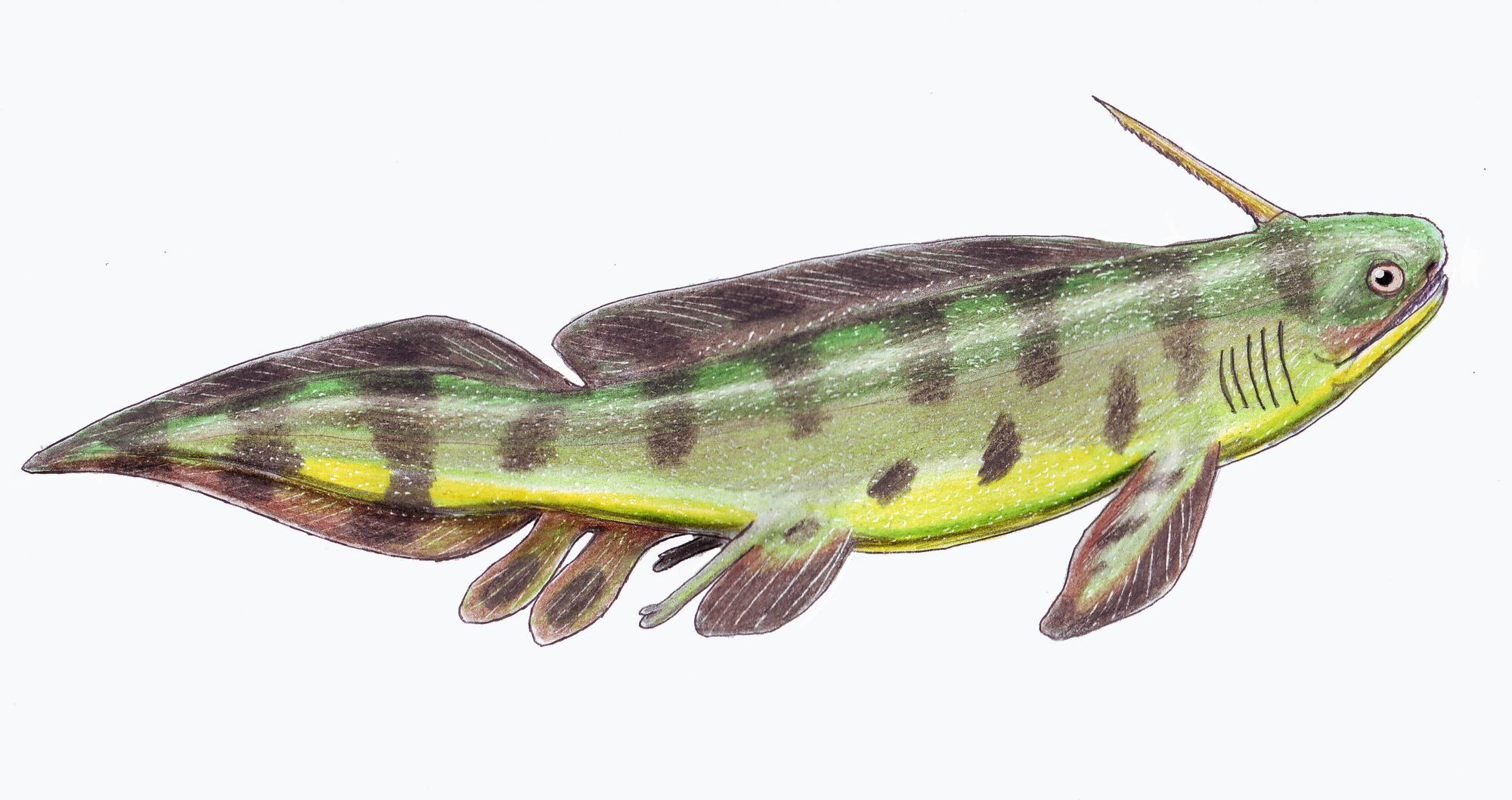
Xenacanthus gaudryi

- †Xampylodon Cappetta, Morrison & Adnet, 2019
  - †Xampylodon dentatus Woodward, 1886
  - †Xampylodon loozi (Vincent 1876)
  - †Xampylodon brotzeni (Siverson 1995)
  - †Xampylodon diastemacron Santos et al. 2024
- †Xenacanthus Beyrich, 1848
  - †Xenacanthus decheni Goldfuss, 1847
  - †Xenacanthus elegans Traquair, 1881
  - †Xenacanthus gaudryi Brongniart & Sauvage, 1888
  - †Xenacanthus humbergensis Hampe, 1994
  - †Xenacanthus laevissimus Agassiz, 1837
  - †Xenacanthus latus Newberry & Worthen, 1866
  - †Xenacanthus meisenheimensis Hampe, 1994
  - †Xenacanthus oelbergensis Fritsch, 1890
  - †Xenacanthus ossiani Johnson, 1999
  - †Xenacanthus ovalis Fritsch, 1890
  - †Xenacanthus parallelus Fritsch, 1890
  - †Xenacanthus ragonhai Pauliv, Dias, Sedor & Ribeiro, 2014
  - †Xenacanthus remigiusbergensis Hampe, 1994
  - †Xenacanthus slaughteri Johnson, 1999
  - †Xenacanthus tenuis Woodward, 1889
  - †Xenacanthus tocantinsensis Santos & Salgado, 1970
- †Xenosynechodus Glikman, 1980
  - †Xenosynechodus egloni Glikman, 1980
- †Xinjiangichthys Wang, Zhang, Wang & Zhu, 1998
  - †Xinjiangichthys pluridentatus Wang, Zhang, Wang & Zhu, 1998
  - †Xinjiangichthys tarimensis Wang, Zhang, Wang & Zhu, 1998
- †Xiphodolamia Leidy, 1877
  - †Xiphodolamia ensis Leidy, 1877
  - †Xiphodolamia eocaena Woodward, 1889
  - †Xiphodolamia serrata Adnet, Hosseinzadeh, Antunes, Balbino, Kozlov & Cappetta, 2009
- †Xystracanthus Leidy, 1859
  - †Xystracanthus arcuatus Leidy, 1859
- †Xystrogaleus Adnet, 2006
  - †Xystrogaleus cappettai Adnet, 2006

== Y ==
- †Youssoubatis Cappetta, 1992
  - †Youssoubatis ganntourensis Cappetta, 1992

== Z ==
- †Zamponiopteron Janvier & Suarez-Riglos, 1986
  - †Zamponiopteron falciformis Janvier & Suarez-Riglos, 1986
  - †Zamponiopteron spinifera Janvier & Suarez-Riglos, 1986
  - †Zamponiopteron triangularis Janvier & Suarez-Riglos, 1986
- **Zapteryx** Jordan & Gilbert, 1880
  - †Zapteryx bichuti Signeux, 1961
- †Zygzabatis Mendiola, 1995
  - †Zygzabatis maroccana Mendiola, 1995

== See also ==
- Cartilaginous fish
- List of acanthodians
- List of placoderms
- List of prehistoric bony fish
- List of prehistoric jawless fish
- List of sharks
