= 2012 in paleoichthyology =

This list of fossil fish species is a list of taxa of fish that have been described during the year 2012. The list only includes taxa at the level of genus or species.

== Newly named jawless vertebrates ==
Name	Novelty	Status	Authors	Age	Unit	Location	Notes	Images
Diademaspis janvieri	Sp. nov	Valid	Keating, Sansom & Purnell	Early Devonian (Lochkovian)	Wayne Herbert Quarry	United Kingdom	A member of Osteostraci, a species of Diademapsis.	
Dunyu	Gen. et sp. et comb. nov	Valid	Zhu, Liu, Jia & Gai	Silurian	Huixingshao Formation; Kuanti Formation	China	A eugaleaspidiform galeaspid. Its type species is Dunyu longiforus; genus also contains "Eugaleaspis" xiushanensis Liu 1983.	
Janaspis	Gen. et comb et 2 sp. nov	Valid	Keating, Sansom & Purnell	Early Devonian (Lochkovian)	Wayne Herbert Quarry	United Kingdom	A new genus of Osteostraci including the type species "Cephalaspis" pagei Lankester, 1868 and new species J. newtonensis and J. punctata.	
Kerreralepis	Gen. et sp. nov	Valid	Blom	Lower Devonian		United Kingdom	A birkeniid anaspid. The type species is Kerreralepis carinata.	
Waengsjoeaspis platycornis	Sp. nov	Valid	Scott & Wilson	Early Devonian (Lochkovian)	Man On The Hill Lagerstätte	Canada	A member of Osteostraci, a species of Waengsjoeaspis.	
Zenaspis waynensis	Sp. nov	Valid	Keating, Sansom & Purnell	Early Devonian (Lochkovian)	Wayne Herbert Quarry	United Kingdom	A member of Osteostraci, a species of Zenaspis.	

== Newly named acanthodians ==
Name	Novelty	Status	Authors	Age	Unit	Location	Notes	Images
Halimacanthodes	Gen. et sp. nov	Valid	Burrow, Trinajstic & Long	Late Devonian (Frasnian)	Gogo Formation	Australia	An acanthodiform acanthodian. The type species is Halimacanthodes ahlbergi.	
Machaeracanthus goujeti	Sp. nov	Valid	Botella, Martínez-Pérez & Soler-Gijón	Early Devonian		France; Spain	A species of Machaeracanthus.	
Podoliacanthus	Gen. et sp. nov	Valid	Voichyshyn & Szaniawski	Early Devonian, possibly also late Silurian.		Ukraine; Greenland	An ischnacanthiform, possibly an ischnacanthid. The type species is Podoliacanthus zychi; also contains three yet unnamed species.	

== Newly named cartilaginous fishes ==
Name	Novelty	Status	Authors	Age	Unit	Location	Notes	Images
Abdounia lata	Sp. nov	Valid	Malyshkina	Late Eocene	Tavda Formation	Russia	A requiem shark, a species of Abdounia.	
Abdounia vassilyevae	Sp. nov	Valid	Malyshkina	Late Eocene	Tavda Formation	Russia	A requiem shark, a species of Abdounia.	
Agaleorhynchus	Gen. et sp. nov	Valid	Guinot et al.	Late Cretaceous (late Santonian to early Campanian)		United Kingdom	A sclerorhynchid. The type species is Agaleorhynchus britannicus.	
Argoubia	Gen. et sp. nov	Valid	Adnet et al.	Late Eocene		Morocco	A mobulid. The type species is Argoubia barbei.	
Australopristis	Gen. et sp. nov	Valid	Martill & Ibrahim	Late Cretaceous		New Zealand	A sawfish. The type species is Australopristis wiffeni.	
Borodinopristis shannoni	Sp. nov	Valid	Case et al.	Late Cretaceous (Campanian)		United States	A sclerorhynchid sawfish, a species of Borodinopristis.	
Carcharodon hubbelli	Sp. nov	Valid	Ehret et al.	Late Miocene	Pisco Formation	Peru	A lamnid shark, a species of Carcharodon.	
Cretaplatyrhinoidis	Gen. et sp. nov	Valid	Guinot et al.	Late Cretaceous (Santonian to Campanian)		France; United Kingdom	A platyrhinid. The type species is Cretaplatyrhinoidis ornatus.	
Cromhallia	Gen. et sp. nov	Valid	Behan, Walken & Cuny	Early Carboniferous		United Kingdom	A chondrichthyan of indeterminate phylogenetic relationships. The type species is Cromhallia parvunda.	
Duffinselache	Gen. et comb. nov	Valid	Andreev & Cuny	Rhaetian		United Kingdom	A shark, a new genus for "Polyacrodus" holwellensis (Duffin, 1998).	
Eoplinthicus underwoodi	Sp. nov	Valid	Adnet et al.	Late Eocene		Morocco	A mobulid, a species of Eoplinthicus.	
Fragilicorona wanlantricuspis	Sp. nov	Valid	Zhang et al.	Middle Triassic (Ladinian)	Zhuganpo Formation	China	An elasmobranch, a species of Fragilicorona.	
Galeocorax	Nom. nov	Valid	Cappetta	Late Cretaceous		United Kingdom; United States	A shark related to Pseudocorax; a replacement name for Paracorax Cappetta (1977).	
Glabrisubcorona triridgecorona	Sp. nov	Valid	Zhang et al.	Middle Triassic (Ladinian)	Zhuganpo Formation	China	An elasmobranch, a species of Glabrisubcorona.	
Isacrodus	Gen. et sp. nov	Valid	Ivanov, Nestell & Nestell	Middle Permian (Roadian)	Cutoff Formation	United States	A jalodontid chondrichthyan. The type species is Isacrodus marthae.	
Kaibabvenator	Gen. et sp. nov	Valid	Hodnett et al.	Permian (Late Leonardian)	Kaibab Limestone	United States	A ctenacanthiform. The type species is Kaibabvenator swiftae.	
Nanocorax	Nom. nov	Valid	Cappetta	Late Cretaceous		France; United Kingdom; United States	A member of Anacoracidae; a replacement name for Microcorax Cappetta & Case (1975).	
Nanoskalme	Gen. et sp. nov	Valid	Hodnett et al.	Permian (Late Leonardian)	Kaibab Limestone	United States	A ctenacanthiform. The type species is Nanoskalme natans.	
Neosaivodus	Gen. et sp. nov	Valid	Hodnett et al.	Permian (Late Leonardian)	Kaibab Limestone	United States	A ctenacanthiform. The type species is Neosaivodus flagstaffensis.	
Odontaspis watinensis	Sp nov	Valid	Cook et al.	Late Cretaceous (early Turonian)	Kaskapau Formation	Canada	A species of Odontaspis.	
Oromobula	Gen. et sp. nov	Valid	Adnet et al.	Late Eocene		Morocco	A mobulid. The type species is Oromobula dakhlaensis.	
Parasquatina jarvisi	Sp nov	Valid	Guinot et al.	Late Cretaceous (late Santonian to early late Campanian)		France; United Kingdom	A squatiniform, a species of Parasquatina.	
Parasquatina justinensis	Sp nov	Valid	Guinot et al.	Late Cretaceous (middle Turonian)		France	A squatiniform, a species of Parasquatina.	
Plesiobatis vandenboschi	Sp. nov	Valid	Bor, Reinecke & Verschueren	Miocene (early Langhian)	Breda Formation	Netherlands	A relative of the deepwater stingray.	
Proteothrinax	Nom. nov	Valid	Pfeil	Eocene (Lutetian)	Weitwies Subformation	Austria	A member of Chlamydoselachidae; a replacement name for Thrinax Pfeil (1983).	
Pseudoplatyrhina	Gen. et sp. nov	Valid	Guinot et al.	Late Cretaceous (late Santonian to early Campanian)		France; United Kingdom	A platyrhinid. The type species is Pseudoplatyrhina crispa.	
Ptychotrygonoides sabatieri	Sp. nov	Valid	Guinot et al.	Late Cretaceous (middle Turonian)		France	A ptychotrygonid, possibly a relative of sclerorhynchids; a species of Ptychotrygonoides.	
"Rhinobatos" seruensis	Sp. nov	Valid	Guinot et al.	Late Cretaceous (late Santonian)		France	A guitarfish, a possible species of Rhinobatos.	
Rhomaleodus	Gen. et sp. nov	Valid	Andreev & Cuny	Anisian		Bulgaria	A shark. The type species is Rhomaleodus budurovi.	
Rugosicorona circacarina	Sp. nov	Valid	Zhang et al.	Middle Triassic (Ladinian)	Zhuganpo Formation	China	An elasmobranch, a species of Rugosicorona.	
Sphenacanthus riorastoensis	Sp. nov	Valid	Pauliv, Dias & Sedor	Permian (Wordian to Wuchiapingian)	Rio do Rasto Formation	Brazil	A species of Sphenacanthus.	
Squatirhina draytoni	Sp. nov	Valid	Guinot et al.	Late Cretaceous (late Early Cenomanian to middle Turonian)		France; United Kingdom	A guitarfish, a species of Squatirhina.	
Tantalepis	Gen. et sp. nov	Valid	Sansom et al.	Middle Ordovician (Darriwilian)	Stairway Sandstone	Australia	A gnathostome of uncertain phylogenetic placement, a possible cartilaginous fish. The type species is Tantalepis gatehousei.	
Texasodus	Gen. et sp. nov	Valid	Ivanov, Nestell & Nestell	Middle Permian (late Wordian or early Capitanian)	Bell Canyon Formation	USA	A jalodontid chondrichthyan. The type species is Texasodus varidentatus.	

== Newly named bony fishes ==
Name	Novelty	Status	Authors	Age	Unit	Location	Notes	Images
Aglyptorhynchus hakataramea	sp nov	Valid	Gottfried, Fordyce & Rust	Late Oligocene		New Zealand	A billfish	
Ampheristus neobavaricus	Sp. nov	Valid	Schwarzhans	Paleocene (Danian to Thanetian)	Oiching Formation	Austria; Germany	A cusk-eel, a species of Ampheristus.	
Anguilla pfeili	Sp. nov	Valid	Schwarzhans	Paleocene (Danian)	Oiching Formation	Germany	A member of Anguillidae, a species of Anguilla.	
Apsopelix miyazakii	Sp. nov	Valid	Yabumoto, Hikida & Nishino	Late Cretaceous (Turonian)		Japan	A species of Apsopelix.	
Argyripnus kroisbachensis	Sp. nov	Valid	Schwarzhans	Paleocene (Thanetian)	Oiching Formation	Austria	A member of Sternoptychidae, a species of Argyripnus.	
Aspidopleurus kickapoo	Sp. nov	Valid	Alvarado-Ortega & Porras-Múzquiz	Late Cretaceous (Turonian)	Eagle Ford Formation	Mexico	An aspidopleurid aulopiform, a species of Aspidopleurus.	
Aspistor verumquadriscutis	sp nov	Valid	Aguilera & Marceniuk	Late Miocene	Urumaco Formation	Venezuela	An ariid, a species of Aspistor.	
Aulopus praeteritus	Sp. nov	Valid	Schwarzhans	Paleocene (Thanetian)	Oiching Formation	Austria	A member of Aulopidae, a species of Aulopus.	
Bavariscopelus parvinavis	Sp. nov	Valid	Schwarzhans	Paleocene (Danian)	Oiching Formation	Germany	A member of Myctophiformes of uncertain phylogenetic placement, a species of Bavariscopelus.	
Bawitius	Gen. et comb. nov	Valid	Grandstaff et al.	Cenomanian	Bahariya Formation	Egypt	A polypterid actinopterygian, a new genus for "Polypterus" bartheli (Schaal, 1984).	
Belonostomus marquesbritoi	Sp. nov	Valid	Taverne & Capasso	Late Cretaceous (Campanian-Maastrichtian boundary)		Italy	A member of Aspidorhynchiformes, a species of Belonostomus.	
Bruehnopteron	Gen. et sp. nov	Valid	Schultze & Reed	Middle Devonian		United States	A tristichopterid sarcopterygian. The type species is Bruehnopteron murphyi. The species was argued by Parfitt et al. (2014) to be likely junior synonym of Tinirau clackae.	
Caruso	Gen. et comb. nov	Valid	Carnevale & Pietsch	Eocene		Italy	A lophiid anglerfish, a new genus for "Lophius" brachysomus (Agassiz).	
Centroberyx apogoniformis	Sp. nov	Valid	Schwarzhans	Late Cretaceous (Maastrichtian) and Paleocene (Danian to Thanetian)	Oiching Formation	Austria; Germany; United States (Arkansas; Texas)	A member of Berycidae, a species of Centroberyx.	
Cyclogonostoma	Gen. et sp. nov	Valid	Schwarzhans	Paleocene (Thanetian)	Oiching Formation	Austria	A member of Gonostomatidae. The type species is Cyclogonostoma disciformis.	
Danoscopelus	Gen. et comb. nov	Valid	Schwarzhans	Paleocene (Selandian to Thanetian)	Oiching Formation	Austria; Denmark	A member of Myctophiformes of uncertain phylogenetic placement; a new genus for "genus Myctophidarum" schnetleri Schwarzhans (2003).	
Dentex? solidus	Sp. nov	Valid	Schwarzhans	Paleocene (Danian to Thanetian)	Oiching Formation	Austria; Germany	A member of Sparidae, possibly a species of Dentex.	
Deutschenchelys	Gen. et sp. nov	Valid	Prokofiev	Early Oligocene		Germany	An eel, possibly a member of Moringuidae. The type species is Deutschenchelys micklichi.	
Diandongperleidus	Gen. et sp. nov	Valid	Geng et al.	Middle Triassic (middle or late Anisian)	Guanling Formation	China	A perleidid perleidiform. The type species is Diandongperleidus denticulatus.	
Diretmus serrativenter	Sp. nov	Valid	Schwarzhans	Paleocene (Thanetian)	Oiching Formation	Austria	A spinyfin related to the silver spinyfin.	
Echinelops	Gen. et sp. nov.	Valid	Murray & Hoşgör	Early Oligocene		Turkey	An elopiform fish. The type species is Echinelops ozcani.	
Eotetraodon tavernei	Sp. nov	Valid	Tyler & Bannikov	Eocene (Ypresian or Lutetian)		Italy	A pufferfish, a species of Eotetraodon.	
Eurolebias	Gen. et comb. nov	Valid	Costa	Late Oligocene		France	A pupfish; a new genus for "Prolebias" meridionalis Gaudant (1978).	
Francolebias	Gen. et comb. nov	Valid	Costa	Early Oligocene		France	A relative of Valencia; a new genus for "Prolebias" delphinensis Gaudant (1989) and "Lebias" aymardi Sauvage (1869).	
Frigosorbinia	Gen. et comb. nov	Valid	Bannikov & Tyler	Eocene		Italy	A surgeonfish; a new genus for "Pesciarichthys" baldwinae Sorbini & Tyler (1998).	
Frippia	Gen. et sp. nov	Valid	Bannikov & Carnevale	Eocene		Italy	A member of Percoidei. The type species is Frippia labroiformis.	
Fuyuanperleidus	Gen. et sp. nov	Valid	Geng et al.	Middle Triassic (late Ladinian)	Falang Formation	China	A perleidid perleidiform. The type species is Fuyuanperleidus dengi.	
Galaxias angustiventris	Sp nov	Valid	Schwarzhans in Schwarzhans et al.	Early Miocene	Bannockburn Formation	New Zealand	A galaxiid, a species of Galaxias.	
Galaxias brevicauda	Sp nov	Valid	Schwarzhans in Schwarzhans et al.	Early Miocene	Bannockburn Formation	New Zealand	A galaxiid, a species of Galaxias.	
Galaxias bobmcdowalli	Sp nov	Valid	Schwarzhans in Schwarzhans et al.	Early Miocene	Bannockburn Formation	New Zealand	A galaxiid, a species of Galaxias.	
Galaxias papilionis	Sp nov	Valid	Schwarzhans in Schwarzhans et al.	Early Miocene	Bannockburn Formation	New Zealand	A galaxiid, a species of Galaxias.	
Galaxias parvirostris	Sp nov	Valid	Schwarzhans in Schwarzhans et al.	Early Miocene	Bannockburn Formation	New Zealand	A galaxiid, a species of Galaxias.	
Galaxias tabidus	Sp nov	Valid	Schwarzhans in Schwarzhans et al.	Early Miocene		New Zealand	A galaxiid, a species of Galaxias.	
Gerpegezhus	Gen. et sp. nov	Valid	Bannikov & Carnevale	Early Eocene		Russia	A close relative of centriscids. The type species is Gerpegezhus paviai.	
Gnathophis probus	Sp. nov	Valid	Schwarzhans	Paleocene (Danian to Thanetian)	Oiching Formation	Austria; Germany	A member of Congridae, a species of Gnathophis.	
Gorgasia? turgidus	Sp. nov	Valid	Schwarzhans	Paleocene (Thanetian)	Oiching Formation	Austria	A member of Congridae, possibly a species of Gorgasia.	
Haemulon? conjugator	Sp. nov	Valid	Schwarzhans	Paleocene (Danian to Selandian)	Oiching Formation	Austria; Germany	A member of Haemulidae of uncertain phylogenetic placement.	
Hippotropiscis	Gen. et sp. nov	Valid	Žalohar & Hitij	Middle Miocene		Slovenia	A hippocampine syngnathid. The type species is Hippotropiscis frenki.	
Holocentronotus blandus	Sp. nov	Valid	Schwarzhans	Paleocene (Danian to Thanetian)	Oiching Formation	Austria; Germany	A member of Holocentridae, a species of Holocentronotus.	
Ictalurus countermani	sp nov	Valid	Lundberg & Luckenbill	Late Miocene	St. Marys Formation	United States	A species of Ictalurus.	
Illusionella	Gen. et 2 sp. nov	Valid	Baykina	Miocene		Russia	A clupeid fish. Genus contains two species: Illusionella tsurevica and Illusionella pshekhensis. The genus Illusionella was subsequently synonymized with the genus Sarmatella Menner (1949) by Baykina (2013); however, Baykina kept the species I. tsurevica and I. pshekhensis as valid, distinct species within the genus Sarmatella.	
Isozen mareikeae	Sp. nov	Valid	Schwarzhans	Paleocene (Thanetian)	Oiching Formation	Austria	A member of Zeiformes of uncertain phylogenetic placement, related to the family Parazenidae; a species of Isozen.	
Isurichthys breviusculus	Sp nov	Valid	Bannikov	Lower Oligocene		Russia	An ariommatid, a species of Isurichthys.	
Kressenbergichthys	Gen. et sp. nov	Valid	Schwarzhans	Paleocene (Danian to Thanetian)	Oiching Formation	Austria; Germany	A member of Berycidae. The type species is Kressenbergichthys kuhni.	
Kyphosichthys	Gen. et sp. nov	Valid	Xu & Wu	Middle Anisian	Guanling Formation	China	A ginglymodian actinopterygian.	
Lactarius? simplex	Sp. nov	Valid	Schwarzhans	Paleocene (Danian to Thanetian)	Oiching Formation	Austria; Germany	A relative of the false trevally.	
Lebonichthys nardoensis	Sp. nov	Valid	Taverne & Capasso	Late Cretaceous (Campanian-Maastrichtian boundary)		Italy	A bonefish, a species of Lebonichthys.	
Luopingperleidus	Gen. et sp. nov	Valid	Geng et al.	Middle Triassic (middle or late Anisian)	Guanling Formation	China	A perleidid perleidiform. The type species is Luopingperleidus sui.	
Luoxiongichthys	Gen. et sp. nov	Valid	Wen et al.	Middle Anisian	Guanling Formation	China	A basal actinopterygian.	
Macrosemimimus	Gen. et sp. et comb. nov	Valid	Schröder, López-Arbarello & Ebert	Late Jurassic		France; Germany; United Kingdom	A semionotiform. The type species is Macrosemimimus fegerti; "Lepidotes" lennieri (Sauvage, 1893) is a second species of Macrosemimimus.	
Mataichthys	Gen. et sp. nov	Valid	Schwarzhans, Scofield, Tennyson & T. Worthy in Schwarzhans et al.	Early Miocene	Bannockburn Formation	New Zealand	An eleotrid. Contains M. bictenatus, M. procerus, M. rhinoceros, and M. taurinus	
Melamphaes? protoforma	Sp. nov	Valid	Schwarzhans	Paleocene (Thanetian)	Oiching Formation	Austria	A ridgehead of uncertain phylogenetic placement.	
Mercediella	Nom. nov	Valid	Koerber	Early Cretaceous	Riachuelo Formation	Brazil	A member of Pycnodontiformes; a replacement name for Camposichthys Figueiredo & Silva Santos (1991).	
Nanaichthys	Gen. et sp. nov	Valid	Amaral & Brito	Early Cretaceous, possibly Aptian	Marizal Formation	Brazil	A member of Chanidae. The type species is Nanaichthys longipinnus.	
Nardoelops	Gen. et sp. nov	Valid	Taverne & Capasso	Late Cretaceous (Campanian-Maastrichtian boundary)		Italy	A member of Elopidae. The type species is Nardoelops nybelini.	
Nettastoma davejohnsoni	Sp. nov	Valid	Schwarzhans	Paleocene (Selandian to Thanetian)	Oiching Formation	Austria	A member of Nettastomatidae, a species of Nettastoma.	
Ogcocephalus? semen	Sp. nov	Valid	Schwarzhans	Paleocene (Thanetian)	Oiching Formation	Austria	A member of Ogcocephalidae, possibly a species of Ogcocephalus.	
Pachyrhizodus grawi	Sp. nov	Valid	Bartholomai	Early Cretaceous (Albian)	Allaru Formation; Toolebuc Formation	Australia		
Palaeogadus? bratishkoi	Sp. nov	Valid	Schwarzhans	Late Cretaceous (Maastrichtian) and Paleocene (Danian and Thanetian)	Kemp Clay; Oiching Formation	Austria; Denmark; United States (Texas)	Originally described as a member of Merlucciidae and a possible species of Palaeogadus. Subsequently reinterpreted as a stem gadiform of uncertain familial affinities and transferred to the genus Archaemacruroides by Schwarzhans & Stringer (2020).	
Palatinichthys	Gen. et sp. nov	Valid	Witzmann & Schoch	Lower Permian	Saar–Nahe Basin	Germany	A megalichthyid sarcopterygian. The type species is Palatinichthys laticeps.	
Paleotetra	Gen. et 2 sp.	Valid	Weiss, L. R. Malabarba & M. C. Malabarba	Eocene to Oligocene		Brazil	A characiform, probably a characid. The genus contains two species: Paleotetra entrecorregos and Paleotetra aiuruoca.	
Paraconger vetustus	Sp. nov	Valid	Schwarzhans	Paleocene (Danian)	Oiching Formation	Germany	A member of Congridae, a species of Paraconger.	
Paraulopus novellus	Sp. nov	Valid	Schwarzhans	Paleocene (Danian, possibly Thanetian)	Oiching Formation	Germany; Austria?	A species of Paraulopus.	
Paranaichthys	Gen. et sp. nov	Valid	Dias	Permian, Guadalupian (Wordian or Capitanian)	Rio do Rasto Formation	Brazil	A probable relative of Platysomus and other platysomids. The type species is Paranaichthys longianalis.	
Parawenzichthys	Gen. et sp. nov	Valid	de Figueiredo, Gallo & Delarmelina	Turonian	Atlântida Formation	Brazil	A protacanthopterygian.	
Platysepta kressenbergensis	Sp. nov	Valid	Schwarzhans	Paleocene (Danian to Thanetian)	Oiching Formation	Austria; Germany	A member of Sparidae, a species of Platysepta.	
Plesiopoma elegantissima	Sp. nov	Valid	Schwarzhans	Paleocene (Danian)	Oiching Formation	Germany	A member of Acropomatidae, a species of Plesiopoma.	
Plesiopoma traubi	Sp. nov	Valid	Schwarzhans	Paleocene (Danian to Thanetian)	Oiching Formation	Austria; Germany	A member of Acropomatidae, a species of Plesiopoma.	
Polymixia polita	Sp. nov	Valid	Schwarzhans	Paleocene (Danian to Thanetian)	Oiching Formation	Austria; Germany	A beardfish.	
Polyperca exserta	Sp. nov	Valid	Schwarzhans	Paleocene (Danian)	Oiching Formation	Germany	A member of Serranidae, a species of Polyperca.	
Prognathoglossum	Gen. et sp. nov	Valid	Taverne & Capasso	Late Cretaceous (Cenomanian)		Lebanon	A member of the family Pantodontidae. The type species is P. kalassyi.	
Progonostoma	Gen. et 2 sp. nov	Valid	Schwarzhans	Paleocene (Thanetian)	Oiching Formation	Austria	A member of Gonostomatidae. The type species is Progonostoma primordialis; genus also contains Progonostoma hagni.	
Prototroctes modestus	Sp nov	Valid	Schwarzhans in Schwarzhans et al.	Early Miocene	Bannockburn Formation	New Zealand	A retropinnid, a species of Prototroctes.	
Prototroctes vertex	Sp nov	Valid	Schwarzhans in Schwarzhans et al.	Early Miocene	Bannockburn Formation	New Zealand	A retropinnid, a species of Prototroctes.	
Rebellatrix	Gen. et sp. nov	Valid	Wendruff & Wilson	Lower Triassic	Sulphur Mountain Formation	Canada	A coelacanth. The type species is Rebellatrix divaricerca.	
Reidus	Gen. et sp. nov	Valid	Graf	Albian		United States	A coelacanth. The type species is Reidus hilli.	
Rhinodipterus kimberleyensis	Sp nov	Valid	Clement	Late Devonian	Gogo Formation	Australia	A lungfish, a species of Rhinodipterus.	
Rhynchoconger intercedens	Sp. nov	Valid	Schwarzhans	Paleocene (Danian to Thanetian)	Oiching Formation	Austria; Germany	A member of Congridae, a species of Rhynchoconger.	
Sangiorgioichthys valmarensis	Sp. nov	Valid	Lombardo, Tintori & Tona	Middle Triassic (late Ladinian)		Switzerland	A semionotid semionotiform, a species of Sangiorgioichthys.	
Schaefferius	Nom. nov	Valid	Akbulut & Özdikmen	Early Triassic		Angola	A member of Palaeonisciformes belonging to the family Canobiidae; a replacement name for Marquesia Schaeffer (1990).	
Sinamia liaoningensis	sp nov	Valid	Zhang	Early Cretaceous (Barremian to Aptian)	Jiufotang Formation; Yixian Formation	China	A sinamiid amiiform, a species of Sinamia.	
Squamibolcoides	Gen. et sp. nov	Valid	Bannikov & Zorzin	Eocene		Italy	A member of Percoidei of uncertain phylogenetic placement. The type species is Squamibolcoides minciottii.	
Thoracopterus wushaensis	Sp. nov	Valid	Tintori et al.	Middle Triassic (late Ladinian)	Falang Formation	China	A thoracopterid peltopleuriform, a species of Thoracopterus. The species might be synonymous with the species Potanichthys xingyiensis Xu et al. (2013).	
Tinirau	Gen. et sp. nov	Valid	Swartz	Middle Devonian	Red Hill I beds	United States	An eotetrapodiform tetrapodomorph related to the clade Elpistostegalia or a tristichopterid. The type species is Tinirau clackae.	
Tomognathus gigeri	sp nov	Valid	Cavin & Giner	Valanginian		France	A halecomorph fish, a species of Tomognathus.	
Trachichthys anomalopsoides	Sp. nov	Valid	Schwarzhans	Paleocene (Danian to Thanetian)	Oiching Formation	Austria; Germany	A slimehead, a species of Trachichthys.	
Trachichthys impavidus	Sp. nov	Valid	Schwarzhans	Paleocene (Danian to Thanetian)	Oiching Formation	Austria; Germany	A slimehead, a species of Trachichthys.	
Tungsenia	Gen. et sp. nov	Valid	Lu et al.	Early Devonian		China	A basal member of Tetrapodomorpha. The type species is Tungsenia paradoxa.	
Valenciennellus kennetti	Sp. nov	Valid	Schwarzhans	Paleocene (Thanetian)	Oiching Formation	Austria	A member of Sternoptychidae, a species of Valenciennellus.	
Voelklichthys	Gen. et sp. nov	Valid	Arratia & Schultze	Kimmeridgian		Germany	A macrosemiiform. The type species is Voelklichthys comitatus.	
Zoqueichthys	Gen. et sp. nov	Valid	Alvarado-Ortega & Than-Marchese	Late Cretaceous (Cenomanian)	Sierra Madre Formation	Mexico	A close relative of Aipichthyoides and Aspesaipichthys, more distantly related to Aipichthys. The type species is Zoqueichthys carolinae.	
