= Eutaw Formation =

Geological formation in the southern United States

- Stratigraphic range: Upper Cretaceous
- Type: Geological formation
- Sub-units: Tombigbee Sand Member, Ingersoll Shale
- Underlies: Austin Group and Mooreville Chalk Formation
- Overlies: Tuscaloosa Group
- Thickness: 40 m (130 ft) to 120 m (390 ft)

Lithology
- Primary: Glauconitic sandstone

Location
- Region: Alabama, Georgia, Mississippi
- Country: United States

Type section
- Named for: Eutaw, Alabama

The Eutaw Formation is a geological formation in North America, within the U.S. states of Alabama, Georgia, and Mississippi. The strata date from the late Coniacian to the early Santonian stage of the Late Cretaceous. It consists of the upper Tombigbee Sand Member and an unnamed lower member. Dinosaur, mosasaur, and pterosaur remains have been recovered from the Eutaw Formation.

== Vertebrate paleofauna ==
=== Cartilaginous fish ===
Cartilaginous fish of the Eutaw Formation
Taxa	Species	State	Stratigraphic position	Abundance	Notes	Images
Archaeolamna	A. kopingensis	Alabama			A lamniform shark	Tooth of Cretoxyrhina mantelli Ischyrhiza mira rostral spines Teeth of Scapanorhynchus texanus Squalicorax falcatus
Borodinopristis	B. schwimmeri	Alabama			A sclerorhynchid	Tooth of Cretoxyrhina mantelli Ischyrhiza mira rostral spines Teeth of Scapanorhynchus texanus Squalicorax falcatus
Brachyrhizodus	B. mcnultyi	Alabama			Myliobatids	Tooth of Cretoxyrhina mantelli Ischyrhiza mira rostral spines Teeth of Scapanorhynchus texanus Squalicorax falcatus
Brachyrhizodus	B. wichitaensis	Alabama			Myliobatids	Tooth of Cretoxyrhina mantelli Ischyrhiza mira rostral spines Teeth of Scapanorhynchus texanus Squalicorax falcatus
Carcharias	C. sp.	Alabama			A lamniform shark	Tooth of Cretoxyrhina mantelli Ischyrhiza mira rostral spines Teeth of Scapanorhynchus texanus Squalicorax falcatus
Cantioscyllium	C. globidens	Alabama			Carpet sharks	Tooth of Cretoxyrhina mantelli Ischyrhiza mira rostral spines Teeth of Scapanorhynchus texanus Squalicorax falcatus
Cantioscyllium	C. decipiens (=C. meyeri or C. saginatus?)	Alabama			Carpet sharks	Tooth of Cretoxyrhina mantelli Ischyrhiza mira rostral spines Teeth of Scapanorhynchus texanus Squalicorax falcatus
Chiloscyllium	C. greeni	Alabama			A hemiscylliid	Tooth of Cretoxyrhina mantelli Ischyrhiza mira rostral spines Teeth of Scapanorhynchus texanus Squalicorax falcatus
Cretodus	C. semiplicatus	Alabama			A lamniform shark	Tooth of Cretoxyrhina mantelli Ischyrhiza mira rostral spines Teeth of Scapanorhynchus texanus Squalicorax falcatus
Cretalamna	C. appendiculata	Alabama			Otodontids	Tooth of Cretoxyrhina mantelli Ischyrhiza mira rostral spines Teeth of Scapanorhynchus texanus Squalicorax falcatus
Cretalamna	C. serrata	Alabama			Otodontids	Tooth of Cretoxyrhina mantelli Ischyrhiza mira rostral spines Teeth of Scapanorhynchus texanus Squalicorax falcatus
Cretoxyrhina	C. mantelli	Alabama			A lamniform shark	Tooth of Cretoxyrhina mantelli Ischyrhiza mira rostral spines Teeth of Scapanorhynchus texanus Squalicorax falcatus
Edaphodon	E. sp.	Alabama			A chimaera	Tooth of Cretoxyrhina mantelli Ischyrhiza mira rostral spines Teeth of Scapanorhynchus texanus Squalicorax falcatus
Heterodontus?	H. sp.	Alabama			A heterodontiform	Tooth of Cretoxyrhina mantelli Ischyrhiza mira rostral spines Teeth of Scapanorhynchus texanus Squalicorax falcatus
Hybodus	H. sp.	Alabama			A hybodontid	Tooth of Cretoxyrhina mantelli Ischyrhiza mira rostral spines Teeth of Scapanorhynchus texanus Squalicorax falcatus
Ischyrhiza	I. mira	Alabama			A rajiform	Tooth of Cretoxyrhina mantelli Ischyrhiza mira rostral spines Teeth of Scapanorhynchus texanus Squalicorax falcatus
Lissodus (=Lonchidion?)	L. sp.	Alabama			A hybodontid	Tooth of Cretoxyrhina mantelli Ischyrhiza mira rostral spines Teeth of Scapanorhynchus texanus Squalicorax falcatus
Paranomotodon	P. angustidens	Alabama			A lamniform shark	Tooth of Cretoxyrhina mantelli Ischyrhiza mira rostral spines Teeth of Scapanorhynchus texanus Squalicorax falcatus
Pseudocorax	P. laevis	Alabama			A lamniform shark	Tooth of Cretoxyrhina mantelli Ischyrhiza mira rostral spines Teeth of Scapanorhynchus texanus Squalicorax falcatus
Pseudohypolophus (=Brachyrhizodus?)	P. mcnultyi	Alabama			A rajiform	Tooth of Cretoxyrhina mantelli Ischyrhiza mira rostral spines Teeth of Scapanorhynchus texanus Squalicorax falcatus
Ptychodus	P. mortoni	Alabama			Ptychodontids	Tooth of Cretoxyrhina mantelli Ischyrhiza mira rostral spines Teeth of Scapanorhynchus texanus Squalicorax falcatus
Ptychodus	P. polygyrus	Alabama			Ptychodontids	Tooth of Cretoxyrhina mantelli Ischyrhiza mira rostral spines Teeth of Scapanorhynchus texanus Squalicorax falcatus
Ptychodus	P. rugosus	Alabama			Ptychodontids	Tooth of Cretoxyrhina mantelli Ischyrhiza mira rostral spines Teeth of Scapanorhynchus texanus Squalicorax falcatus
Ptychotrygon	P. triangularis (=P. vermiculata and/or P. chattahoochiensis?)	Alabama			A ptychotrygonid	Tooth of Cretoxyrhina mantelli Ischyrhiza mira rostral spines Teeth of Scapanorhynchus texanus Squalicorax falcatus
Rajiformes indet.		Alabama				Tooth of Cretoxyrhina mantelli Ischyrhiza mira rostral spines Teeth of Scapanorhynchus texanus Squalicorax falcatus
Scapanorhynchus	S. raphiodon	Alabama			Lamniform sharks	Tooth of Cretoxyrhina mantelli Ischyrhiza mira rostral spines Teeth of Scapanorhynchus texanus Squalicorax falcatus
Scapanorhynchus	S. texanus	Alabama			Lamniform sharks	Tooth of Cretoxyrhina mantelli Ischyrhiza mira rostral spines Teeth of Scapanorhynchus texanus Squalicorax falcatus
Sclerorhynchus?	S. sp.	Alabama			A rajiform	Tooth of Cretoxyrhina mantelli Ischyrhiza mira rostral spines Teeth of Scapanorhynchus texanus Squalicorax falcatus
Squalicorax	S. falcatus	Alabama			Lamniform sharks	Tooth of Cretoxyrhina mantelli Ischyrhiza mira rostral spines Teeth of Scapanorhynchus texanus Squalicorax falcatus
Squalicorax	S. kaupi	Alabama			Lamniform sharks	Tooth of Cretoxyrhina mantelli Ischyrhiza mira rostral spines Teeth of Scapanorhynchus texanus Squalicorax falcatus
Squalicorax	S. pristodontus	Alabama			Lamniform sharks	Tooth of Cretoxyrhina mantelli Ischyrhiza mira rostral spines Teeth of Scapanorhynchus texanus Squalicorax falcatus
Squatina	S. hassei	Alabama			A squatinid	Tooth of Cretoxyrhina mantelli Ischyrhiza mira rostral spines Teeth of Scapanorhynchus texanus Squalicorax falcatus

=== Bony fish ===
Bony fish of the Eutaw Formation
Taxa	Species	State	Stratigraphic position	Abundance	Notes	Images
Albula	A. dunklei	Alabama			A bonefish	Enchodus petrosus Protosphyraena Stratodus Xiphactinus audax
Anomoeodus	A. phaseolus	Alabama			A pycnodontid	Enchodus petrosus Protosphyraena Stratodus Xiphactinus audax
Atractosteus	A. sp.?	Alabama			A gar	Enchodus petrosus Protosphyraena Stratodus Xiphactinus audax
Bananogmius	B. sp.	Alabama			A plethodid	Enchodus petrosus Protosphyraena Stratodus Xiphactinus audax
Belonostomus	B. sp.	Alabama			An aspidorhynchiform	Enchodus petrosus Protosphyraena Stratodus Xiphactinus audax
Enchodus	E. petrosus	Alabama			An enchodontid	Enchodus petrosus Protosphyraena Stratodus Xiphactinus audax
Hadrodus	H. priscus	Alabama			A pycnodontid	Enchodus petrosus Protosphyraena Stratodus Xiphactinus audax
Lepisosteus	L. sp.	Alabama			A gar	Enchodus petrosus Protosphyraena Stratodus Xiphactinus audax
Mawsonia	M. sp.	Alabama			A coelacanthiform fish	Enchodus petrosus Protosphyraena Stratodus Xiphactinus audax
Phacodus	P. puncatatus	Alabama			A pycnodontiform	Enchodus petrosus Protosphyraena Stratodus Xiphactinus audax
Protosphyraena	P. sp.	Alabama			A pachycormiform	Enchodus petrosus Protosphyraena Stratodus Xiphactinus audax
Stratodus	S. apicalis	Alabama			An aulopiform	Enchodus petrosus Protosphyraena Stratodus Xiphactinus audax
Xiphactinus	X. audax	Alabama			An ichthyodectid	Enchodus petrosus Protosphyraena Stratodus Xiphactinus audax

=== Turtles ===
Turtles of the Eutaw Formation
Taxa	Species	State	Stratigraphic position	Abundance	Notes	Images
Chedighaii	C. barberi	Alabama			A bothremydid	Protostega gigas
Protostega	P. gigas	Alabama			A protostegid	Protostega gigas
Thinochelys	T. sp.	Alabama				Protostega gigas
Toxochelys	T. sp.	Alabama				Protostega gigas
Trionychidae indet.		Alabama				Protostega gigas

=== Plesiosaurs ===
Plesiosaurs of the Eutaw Formation
Taxa	Species	State	Stratigraphic position	Abundance	Notes	Images
Discosaurus	D. vetustus	Alabama			An elasmosaurid	Vertebrae of D. vestutus
Elasmosauridae indet.		Alabama				Vertebrae of D. vestutus

=== Mosasaurs ===
Mosasaurs of the Eutaw Formation
Taxa	Species	State	Stratigraphic position	Abundance	Notes	Images
Clidastes	Clidastes sp.	Alabama			A mosasaurine	Eonatator sternbergii Platecarpus tympaniticus Tylosaurus proriger skull
Eonatator	E. sternbergii	Alabama			A halisaurine: 1. E. sternbergii was formerly classified as Halisaurus sternbergii	Eonatator sternbergii Platecarpus tympaniticus Tylosaurus proriger skull
Globidens	G. alabamaensis	Alabama			A mosasaurine	Eonatator sternbergii Platecarpus tympaniticus Tylosaurus proriger skull
Platecarpus	P. tympaniticus	Alabama			A plioplatecarpine	Eonatator sternbergii Platecarpus tympaniticus Tylosaurus proriger skull
Plioplatecarpus	P. sp.	Alabama			A plioplatecarpine	Eonatator sternbergii Platecarpus tympaniticus Tylosaurus proriger skull
Selmasaurus	S. russelli	Alabama			A plioplatecarpine	Eonatator sternbergii Platecarpus tympaniticus Tylosaurus proriger skull
Tylosaurus	T. nepaeolicus	Alabama			Tylosaurines	Eonatator sternbergii Platecarpus tympaniticus Tylosaurus proriger skull
Tylosaurus	T. proriger	Alabama			Tylosaurines	Eonatator sternbergii Platecarpus tympaniticus Tylosaurus proriger skull

=== Crocodylians ===
Crocodylians of the Eutaw Formation
Genus	Species	State	Stratigraphic position	Abundance	Notes	Images
Borealosuchus	B. sp.	Alabama			An eusuchian	A skull of Deinosuchus
Deinosuchus	D. rugosus?	Alabama			An alligatoroid	A skull of Deinosuchus
Leidyosuchus	L. sp.	Alabama			An alligatoroid	A skull of Deinosuchus

=== Ornithodires ===
Dinosaur feathers have been found in the Ingersoll Shale of Georgia, which is a subunit of the Eutaw Formation. Indeterminate hadrosaurid remains have been found in Mississippi. Ornithomimosaurs of medium-size and large-size have also been unearthed in Mississippi.

Ornithodires of the Eutaw Formation
Genus	Species	State	Stratigraphic position	Abundance	Notes	Images
Lophorhothon	L. atopus	Alabama			A hadrosauromorph dinosaur	Illustration of a fossil of Lophorhothon Pteranodon sp.
Pteranodon	Indeterminate	Georgia			A pteranodontid pterosaur	Illustration of a fossil of Lophorhothon Pteranodon sp.

== See also ==
- List of fossil sites
