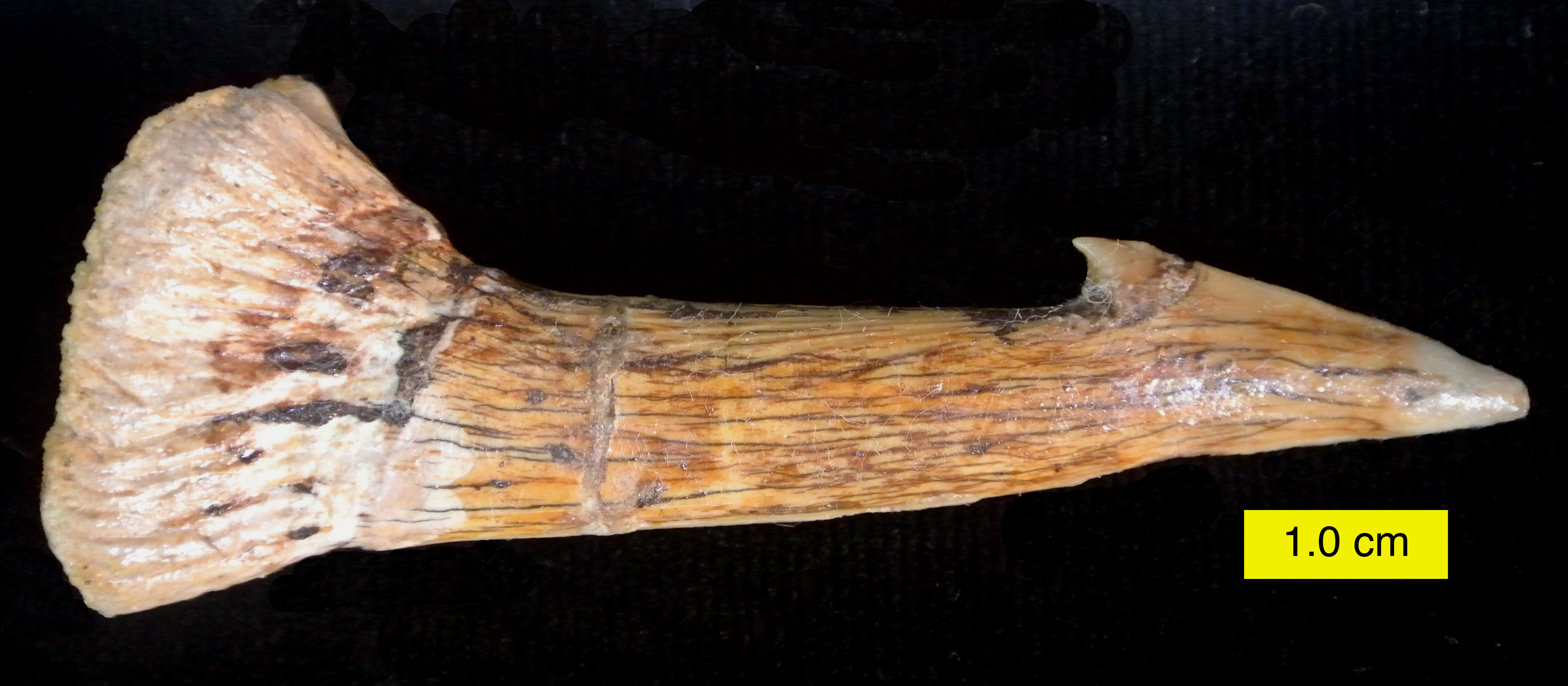
- Rostral denticle of O. numida

Scientific classification
- Kingdom: Animalia
- Phylum: Chordata
- Class: Chondrichthyes
- Subclass: Elasmobranchii
- Order: Rajiformes
- Suborder: †Sclerorhynchoidei
- Family: †Onchopristidae; Villalobos-Segura, Kriwet, Vullo, Stumpf, Ward, & Underwood, 2021
- Genus: †Onchopristis; Stromer, 1917

Type species
- †Onchopristis numida (Haug, 1905)

Other species
- †Onchopristis dunklei McNulty & Slaughter, 1962

Synonyms
- Genus synonymy: Platyspondylus Haug, 1905; Onychopristis Jordan, 1923 (lapsus calami); Peyeria Weiler, 1935; Sechmetia Werner, 1989; Onchopristes Kirkland, 1996 (lapsus calami); Ochopristis Hunt, Santucci, & Kenworthy, 2006 (lapsus calami); Species synonymy: O. numida; Gigantichthys numidus Haug, 1905; Platyspondylus foureaui Haug, 1905; Squatina aegyptiaca Stromer, 1927; Sechmetia aegyptiaca (Stromer, 1927); Peyeria libyca Weiler, 1935 O. dunklei; Onchopristis dunklei praecursor Thurmond, 1971; Sechmetia cruciformis Werner, 1989

= Onchopristis =

Onchopristis Temporal range: Barremian–Cenomanian Potential Maastrichtian records

Extinct genus of cartilaginous fishes

Onchopristis is an extinct genus of sclerorhynchoid, or sawskate, from the Cretaceous of North Africa, Europe, North America, and potentially South America. The genus contains two valid species, O. numida and O. dunklei, though some researchers argue that both may be considered a single taxon with variation in morphology caused by a wide geographical range. Specimens of Onchopristis have been discovered in coastal and fluvial deposits dated from the Barremian to the Cenomanian ages (~125-94 mya), making this genus one of the oldest known sclerorhynchoids.

== Discovery and naming ==
In 1905, the French paleontologist Émile Haug named Gigantichthys numidus based on fragmentary rostral denticles from the Continental intercalaire of Algeria, and named Platyspondylus foureaui based on vertebrae from the same formation. Articulated specimens have confirmed that the rostral denticles and vertebrae belong to the same species. In 1917, Ernst Stromer assigned "G". numidus to a new genus Onchopristis, derived from the Ancient Greek ónkos (ὄγκος, 'barb') and prístis (πρίστις, 'saw' or 'sawfish'). Although the spelling "Onchopristis numidus" is commonly used for the type species, Greenfield (2021) suggested that this is grammatically incorrect and emended it to O. numida.

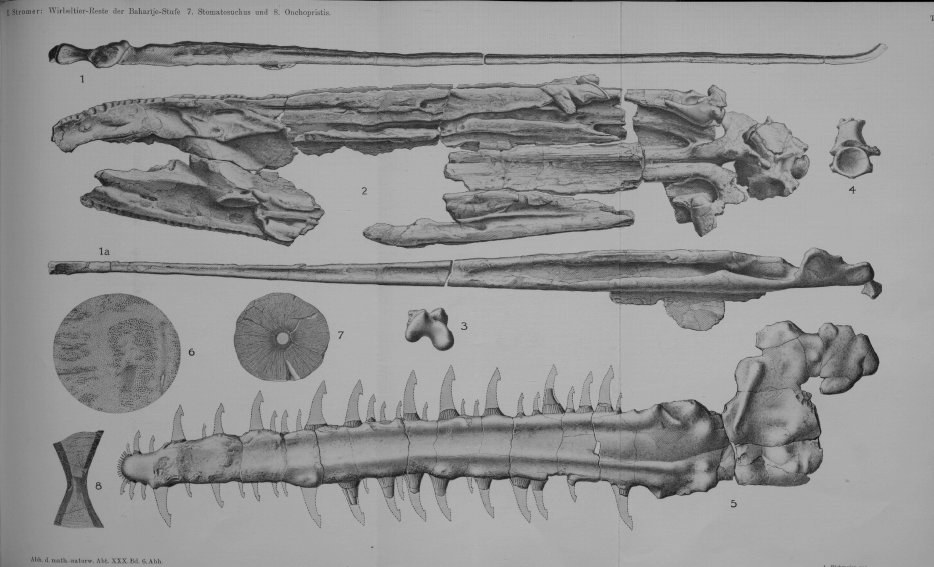
Figure from a 1925 paper by Ernst Stromer on Onchopristis and Stomatosuchus. No. 5 is a rostrum, or saw, from the former.

Oral teeth from the Bahariya Formation of Egypt were named Squatina aegyptiaca by Stromer in 1927, and were later renamed as the separate genus Sechmetia by Christa Werner in 1989. Again, articulated specimens confirmed that these teeth belong to O. numida. In 1935, Wilhelm Weiler named Peyeria libyca for what he thought were sawfish rostral denticles from the Bahariya Formation. An associated specimen of Ischyrhiza mira, a close relative of Onchopristis, indicates that "Peyeria" were actually dermal denticles from O. numida. In 2003, two incomplete rostral denticles, measuring 8.15 mm (0.321 in) and 12.65 mm (0.498 in) respectively, were referred to as Onchopristis cf. O. numida from the Alcântara Formation of Brazil, but were unfigured.

A second valid species from the Woodbine Formation of Texas, Onchopristis dunklei, was named by Charles McNulty, Jr. and Bob Slaughter in 1962. O. dunklei is also known from the Cenomanian of Spain and France, and from the Albian of Tunisia based on incomplete material. In 1971, John Thurmond named the subspecies O. dunklei praecursor, but it is probably not distinct from O. dunklei.

=== Formerly assigned material ===
Fourteen rostral denticles formerly identified as Onchopristis sp. from the Alcântara Formation of Brazil have been redescribed as their own genus and species, Atlanticopristis equatorialis. Rostral denticles from New Zealand formerly referred to "O. d. praecursor" have also been reassigned to their own genus and species, Australopristis wiffeni. An uncritical summary of 70 vertebrate taxa found in the Aguja Formation reports the presence of O. dunklei based on two fragmentary specimens, though the authors acknowledge the skepticism regarding the Campanian-Maastrichtian occurrence of this genus. Subsequent studies have identified these specimens as Columbusia deblieuxi.

In 2019, the isolated rostral denticles found in the possible late Maastrichtian-Paleocene strata from Mali were attributed to O. numida, but these specimens more likely represent cutlassfish fangs. In 2024, four fragmentary rostral denticles and an exceptionally large, 1.46 metres (4.8 ft) long rostrum of sclerorhynchoids from the Maastrichtian-aged Dakhla Formation of Egypt were referred to as Onchopristis sp. However, Greenfield (2025) argued that neither of the referred material from the Dakhla Formation can be assigned to Onchopristis, and he reidentified the rostrum as an indeterminate sclerorhynchoid and the unassociated rostral denticles as Sclerorhynchus cf. leptodon. The authors of the original study stood by their original conclusion, stating that any taxonomic determination of the material without direct examination is unacceptable.

== Description ==
Specimens of O. numida, IPUW 353500 and IGR 2818, suggest a length estimate of 2.94–4.25 m (9.6–13.9 ft) and 2.21–3.15 m (7.3–10.3 ft), respectively; such individuals would have weighed 70–150 kg (150–330 lb). Isolated rostral denticles are the most common fossils of Onchopristis, but rostra, chondrocrania, jaws, oral teeth, vertebrae, and dermal denticles have also been found.

=== Rostrum and cranium ===
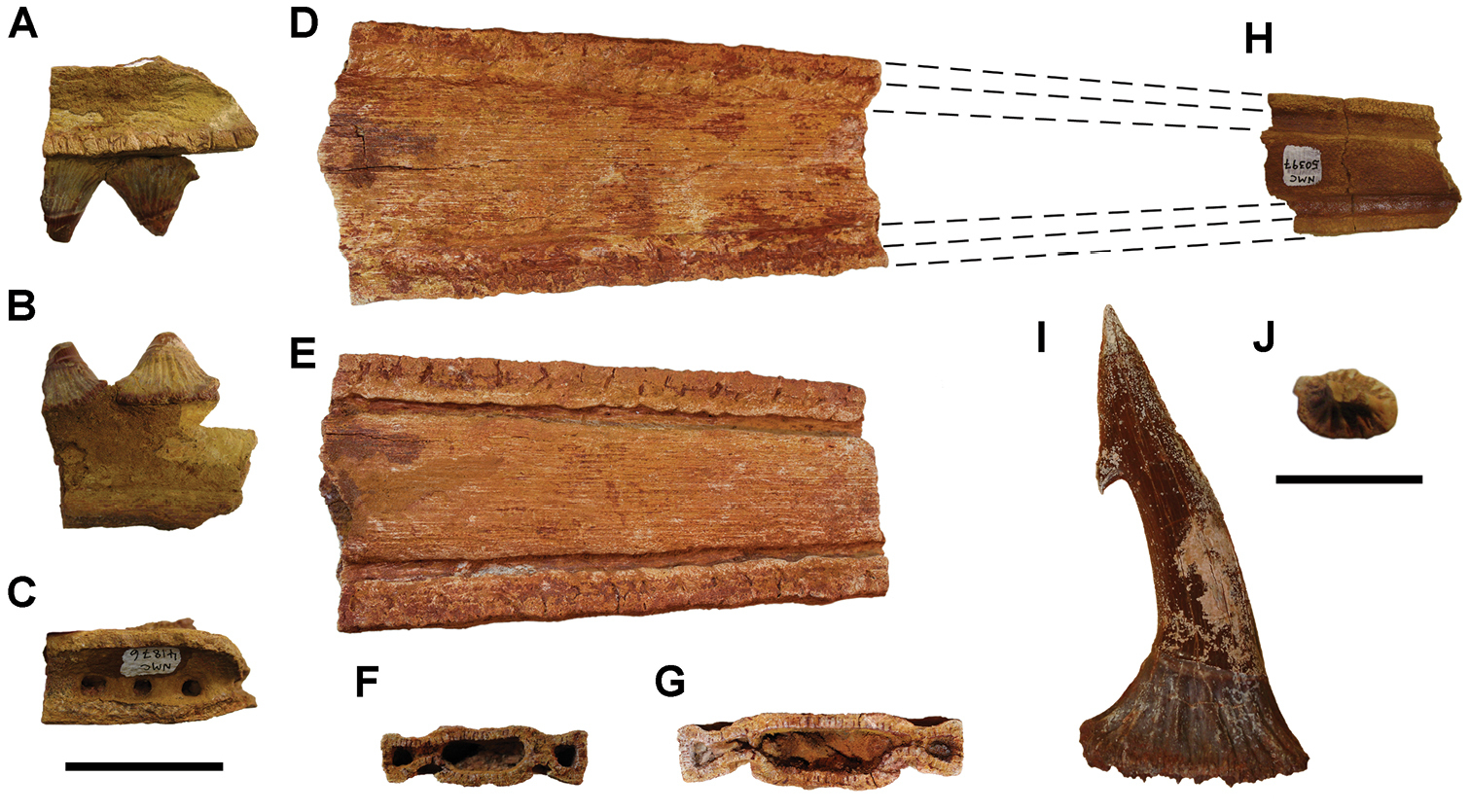
Isolated O. numida rostral and tooth remains

Like other sclerorhynchoids, Onchopristis had a 'saw', a long rostrum with large denticles, similar to those of sawfishes and sawsharks. This feature was the result of convergent evolution, and its repeated evolution among chondrichthyans has been dubbed 'pristification'. The saw, like in those taxa and in other sclerorhynchoids, was cartilaginous and compressed dorsoventrally (from top-to-bottom). It was somewhat triangular in shape, widest at the base, narrowing towards the tip. Internally, it consisted of a layer of small, prismatic cartilage blocks, covered in a fibrous cartilage layer. This layer has been compared to wood cortex, and bears well-mineralised ridges. The rostral denticles at the very front of the saw were very small, Those on the sides of the saw were larger with the biggest measuring 7 cm (2.8 in), and more irregular, with different morphologies observed based on where along the saw the denticles originated from. Based on the variation in denticle size, it is likely that Onchopristis constantly shed and replaced them. Unlike other sclerorhynchoids, Onchopristis denticles possessed small, rearward-projecting projections, called barbs, which vary in number depending on the species: O. numida had one barb per denticle, while O. dunklei had up to three.

The base of the saw transitioned smoothly into the neurocranium (the base of the cranium). The neurocranium was rectangular in shape and box-like. Near the rostral base was an oval-shaped precerebral fenestra. The antorbital cartilage, that behind the eye, was triangular, with a narrow distal (far) edge which pointed posteriorly (rearward). The orbital cavity, or eye socket, is large. Lymphatic foramina were present on the posterior part of the forebrain. Onchopristis' hyomandibula, the structure from which the jaw was suspended, was triangular. Its proximal (near) end articulated with the neurocranium, while the distal end sat between the palatoquadrate and Meckel's cartilage. The jaw cartilages are poorly known, with only those structures being visible when viewed ventrally (from the bottom). Known oral teeth all display well-developed cutting edges, extending continuously between the cusp and lateral cusplets. The cusp of each tooth bends lingually (inwards).

Life restoration of O. dunklei, showing dermal thorns assigned to Peyeria along the back

=== Postcranium and dermal denticles ===
Onchopristis' vertebral centra, as in other chondrichthyans, consist of two structures: the corpus calcareum and the intermedialia. The former is well mineralised and there is some indication that minerals were cyclically deposited, though it is not clear whether this deposition was seasonal as in other chondrichthyans. No additional postcranial remains are known, although based on other sclerorhynchoids, it can be assumed that the ratio between the length of the rostrum and the total length of the body was around 1:3.27. Like some other sclerorhynchoids, notably Ischyrhiza, Onchopristis had large dermal denticles, also known as dermal thorns. In Ischyrhiza, they resembled those of slow-moving, benthic batoids, though their arrangement cannot be fully ascertained. If, as suggested, the "Peyeria" denticles do belong to Onchopristis, it is possible that dermal thorns were widespread throughout sclerorhynchoids.

== Paleobiology ==
=== Predation ===
Specimens of Onchopristis have been associated with the jaws of Spinosaurus in North Africa, indicating that Spinosaurus would have preyed upon Onchopristis based on direct evidence of piscivory. An isolated fish vertebra, tentatively referred to Onchopristis, has been associated with the tooth alveolus of a possible specimen of Spinosaurus (MSNM V 4047). Similarly, the dentary fragment of Spinosaurus aegyptiacus (MPDM 31) is associated with the rostral denticle of Onchopristis. Additionally, the teeth of Spinosaurus and rostral denticles of Onchopristis form a bone bed at one locality in the Kem Kem beds of Morocco (Errachidia Province).

== Documentary appearances ==
Onchopristis first appeared in Planet Dinosaur in 2011 and the companion book in 2012, where it was inaccurately depicted as an 8–10 m (26–33 ft) sawfish. It was also featured in the 2025 revival of Walking with Dinosaurs and the companion book, where it was accurately depicted as a 4 m (13 ft) sawskate. In both documentaries it was shown being preyed on by Spinosaurus in accordance with the fossil evidence.
