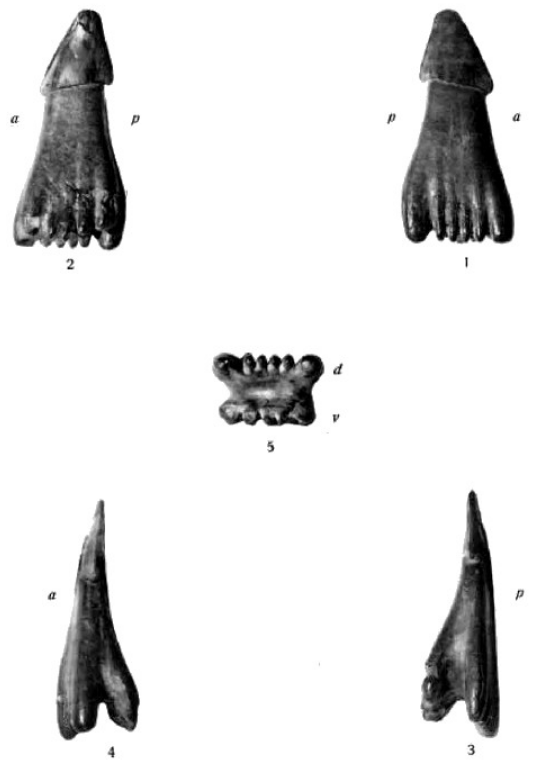
- The holotype of D. stromeri from Libya
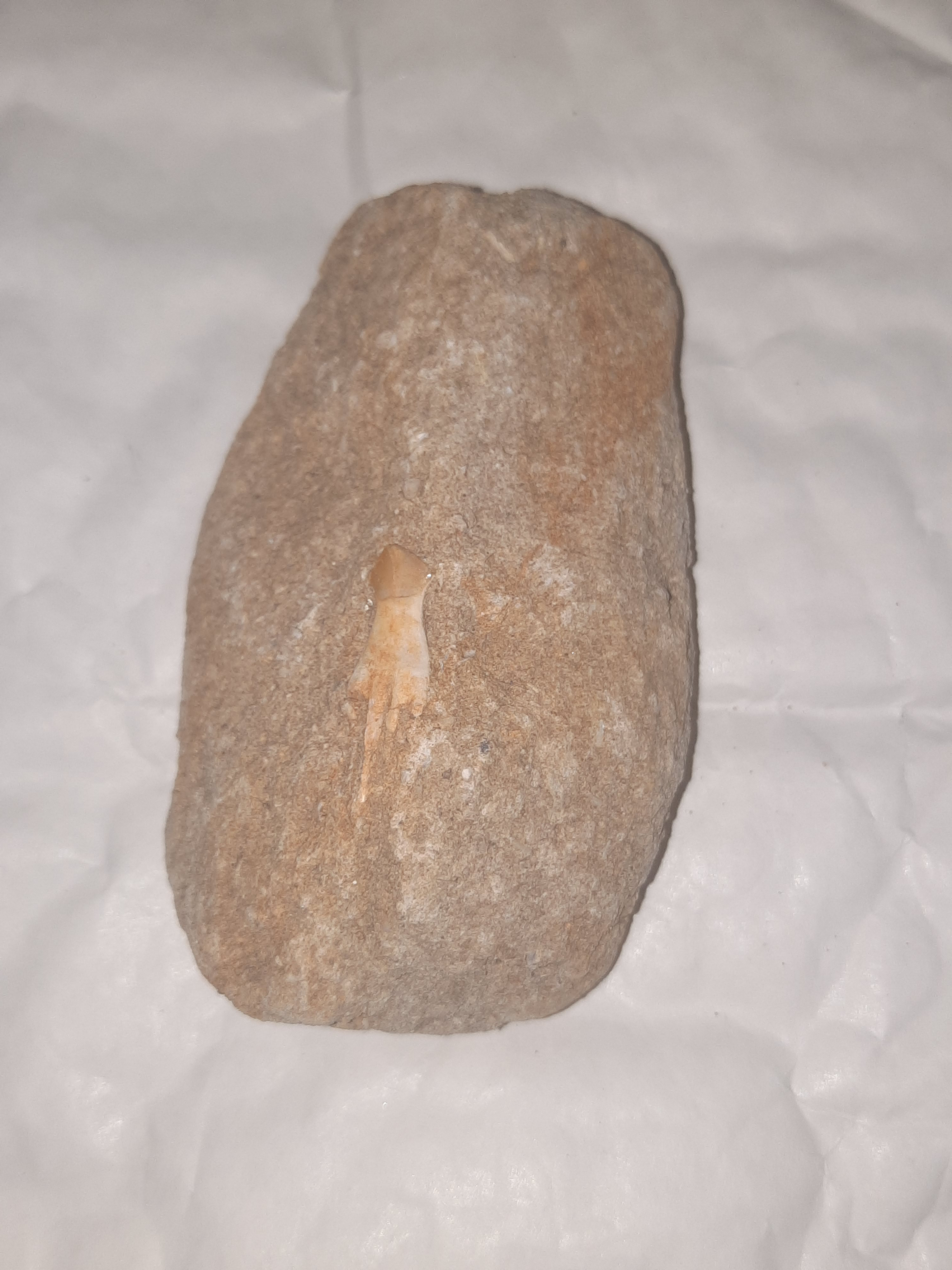
- Dalpiazia stromeri tooth from Morocco

Scientific classification
- Kingdom: Animalia
- Phylum: Chordata
- Class: Chondrichthyes
- Order: Rajiformes
- Suborder: Sclerorhynchoidei
- Genus: †Dalpiazia Checchia-Rispoli, 1933

Binomial name
- †Dalpiazia stromeri Checchia-Rispoli, 1933

Synonyms
- Dalpiazia maroccana; Ischyrhiza maroccana; Ischyrhiza stromeri Arambourg, 1935; Onchosaurus manzadinensis Darteville & Casier, 1943; Onchosaurus maroccana; Onchosaurus stromeri (Arambourg, 1935)

= Dalpiazia =

Dalpiazia Temporal range: Late Cretaceous, Maastrichtian

Genus of cartilaginous fishes

Dalpiazia is an extinct genus of sclerorhynchoid fish whose fossils are found in rocks dating from the Maastrichtian stage in mines in Jordan, Libya, Morocco and Syria. The type species D. stromeri was named by Checchia-Rispoli (1933) in honor of Ernst Stromer, and the holotype, a rostral tooth, was found in Tripolitania, Libya.

The validity of Dalpiazia has been questioned on the basis of its similarities to Ischyrhiza, a subgenus of Onchosaurus.

== See also ==
- Flora and fauna of the Maastrichtian stage
- List of prehistoric cartilaginous fish (Chondrichthyes)
