= Iberotrygon =

Iberotrygon Temporal range: Late Cretaceous, 95 Ma

Scientific classification
- Kingdom: Animalia
- Phylum: Chordata
- Class: Chondrichthyes
- Order: Rajiformes
- Suborder: †Sclerorhynchoidei
- Genus: †Iberotrygon Kriwet, Nunn & Klug, 2009

Binomial name
- †Iberotrygon plagiolophus Kriwet, Nunn & Klug, 2009

Extinct genus of cartilaginous fishes

Iberotrygon is an extinct genus of sclerorhynchoid ray from the Cenomanian Mosqueruela Formation of Spain. Only the single species I. plagiolophus, is known; it was named and described in 2009. It is known from the holotype MPZ 2005-33, an antero-lateral tooth, and the parartypes MPZ 2005-34, four well-preserved teeth from a single juvenile?, and MPZ 2005-35, an isolated tooth (all found in Sample 4 from Facies 2).

The tooth crown of Iberotrygon is cuspidate, with a well-developed, high, pointed, main cusp that is inclined lingually in teeth of juveniles and adults. The lingual margin of the crown overhangs the root, especially towards the apex. The crown is bulky and well defined, while the crown shoulders are short and low, while contrastingly, the cutting edge is blunt but continuous between the central cusp and crown shoulders. In occlusal view the crown is devoid of distinct transversal crests. However, there is some ornamentation, most notably a longitudinal medio-labial ridge, which sometimes bifurcates basally delimiting the apron. There are conspicuous short vertical ridges at the labial crown base. These vertical ridges occasionally are amalgamated in smaller, probably juvenile teeth forming a short transversal crest similar to those found in Ptychotrygon. The apron is broad, with a rounded extremity that is bent basally and is detached from the labial contour. The lingual face is fairly steep, and has a well-developed vertical directed uvula, above which is a well-marked central depression. This depression is bordered dorsally by a short and slightly convex transversal crest, which is constrained to the central cusp. The root is low and narrow, with narrow lobes separated by a broad, but deep central groove. There is no basal bulge.

The teeth of Iberotrygon display some sort of ontogenetic variation. According to the available material, teeth of juvenile individuals seemingly differ from adult ones in the presence of amalgamated vertical ridges into short transversal crests and the presence of a vertical labial crest that tends to bifurcate basally in teeth of adults.

Teeth of Iberotrygon resemble those of Ptychotrygon, Texatrygon and Archingeayia to some extent but can easily be distinguished from those by the character combination indicated in the diagnosis.
