= Asflapristis =

Asflapristis Temporal range: Turonian-Santonian

Scientific classification
- Kingdom: Animalia
- Phylum: Chordata
- Class: Chondrichthyes
- Subclass: Elasmobranchii
- Order: Rajiformes
- Suborder: †Sclerorhynchoidei
- Family: †Ptychotrygonidae
- Genus: †Asflapristis; Villalobos-Segura, Underwood, Ward, & Claeson, 2019

Type species
- †Asflapristis cristadentis Villalobos-Segura, Underwood, Ward, & Claeson, 2019

Other species
- †Asflapristis rugosa (Case, Schwimmer, Borodin & Leggett, 2001)

Synonyms
- Species synonymy: A. rugosa; Erguitaia rugosa Case, Schwimmer, Borodin & Leggett, 2001; Ptychotrygon rugosum (Case, Schwimmer, Borodin & Leggett, 2001)

Extinct genus of cartilaginous fishes

Asflapristis is an extinct genus of ptychotrygonid sclerorhynchoid that lived during the Late Cretaceous. It contains two valid species: A. cristadentis from the Akrabou Formation of Morocco and A. rugosa from the Eutaw Formation of Georgia and Mississippi and the Pleasant Creek Formation of North Carolina. Articulated skeletons of A. cristadentis show it had secondarily lost the rostral denticles typical of sclerorhynchoids, a process called "depristification".
