= Schizorhizidae =

Schizorhizidae Temporal range: Campanian–Maastrichtian

Scientific classification
- Kingdom: Animalia
- Phylum: Chordata
- Class: Chondrichthyes
- Subclass: Elasmobranchii
- Order: Rajiformes
- Suborder: †Sclerorhynchoidei
- Family: †Schizorhizidae; Kirkland & Aguillón-Martínez, 2002

Genera
- †Harranahynchus; †Schizorhiza

Extinct family of cartilaginous fishes

Schizorhizidae is an extinct family of cartilaginous fish from the Late Cretaceous belonging to the suborder Sclerorhynchoidei. This family contains the genera Harranahynchus and Schizorhiza. It was originally named as a subfamily of Sclerorhynchidae, but was later raised to the rank of family.
