= Harranahynchus =

Harranahynchus Temporal range: Late Maastrichtian

Scientific classification
- Domain: Eukaryota
- Kingdom: Animalia
- Phylum: Chordata
- Class: Chondrichthyes
- Subclass: Elasmobranchii
- Order: Rajiformes
- Suborder: †Sclerorhynchoidei
- Family: †Schizorhizidae
- Genus: †Harranahynchus; Kaddumi, 2009
- Species: †H. minutadens

Binomial name
- †Harranahynchus minutadens Kaddumi, 2009

Extinct genus of cartilaginous fishes

Harranahynchus is an extinct genus of schizorhizid sawskate that lived during the Late Cretaceous. It contains one valid species, Harranahynchus minutadens. It is known from relatively complete cranial and body fossils found in the Muwaqqar Chalk Marl Formation of Jordan, dating back to the late Maastrichtian. Its rostral denticles are extremely small and are arranged in batteries like its close relative Schizorhiza. It has an estimated length of around 2 m (6.6 ft).
