= Baharipristis =

Baharipristis Temporal range: Cenomanian

Scientific classification
- Domain: Eukaryota
- Kingdom: Animalia
- Phylum: Chordata
- Class: Chondrichthyes
- Subclass: Elasmobranchii
- Order: Rajiformes
- Suborder: †Sclerorhynchoidei
- Genus: †Baharipristis; Werner, 1989
- Species: †B. bastetiae

Binomial name
- †Baharipristis bastetiae Werner, 1989

Extinct sawfish-like shark genus

Baharipristis is an extinct genus of sclerorhynchoid from the Late Cretaceous. It contains a singular species, B. bastetiae. It was described from the Cenomanian-aged Bahariya formation of Gebel Ghorabi, Egypt based on distinctive isolated rostral teeth. It shares the formation with at least 9 other genera of Sclerorhynchid Saw-snouted sharks.
