= Archingeayia =

Archingeayia Temporal range: Cenomanian

Scientific classification
- Kingdom: Animalia
- Phylum: Chordata
- Class: Chondrichthyes
- Subclass: Elasmobranchii
- Order: Rajiformes
- Suborder: †Sclerorhynchoidei
- Family: †Ptychotrygonidae
- Genus: †Archingeayia; Vullo, Cappetta, & Néraudeau, 2007
- Species: †A. sistaci

Binomial name
- †Archingeayia sistaci Vullo, Cappetta, & Néraudeau, 2007

Archingeayia is an extinct genus of sawskate from the Cretaceous period. The name is derived from the type locale of the type species: Archingeay−Les Nouillers, France. This genus is known currently by isolated oral teeth alone from a singular species, Archingeayia sistaci. The specific epithet honors geologist Paul Sistac. This species was described from the lower Cenomanian of France.
