= Ingersoll Shale =

Late Cretaceous geological unit in Alabama, United States

- Stratigraphic range: Santonian; ~86–85 Ma
- Type: Informal unit
- Unit of: Eutaw Formation
- Thickness: 90 cm (35 in)

Lithology
- Primary: Claystone
- Other: Sandstone

Location
- Coordinates: 32.5°N 85.0°W
- Approximate paleocoordinates: 32.4°N 54.2°W
- Region: Russell County, Alabama
- Country: United States
- Extent: <30 m (98 ft)
- Ingersoll Shale (the United States) Ingersoll Shale (Alabama)

The Ingersoll Shale is a Late Cretaceous (Santonian) informal geological unit in eastern Alabama. Fourteen theropod feathers assigned to birds and possibly dromaeosaurids have been recovered from the unit.

== Description ==
The Ingersoll Shale consists of a clay-dominated lens, asymmetrical in cross-section, with a maximum thickness of 90 centimetres (35 in) and a width estimated to be less than 30 metres (98 ft).
