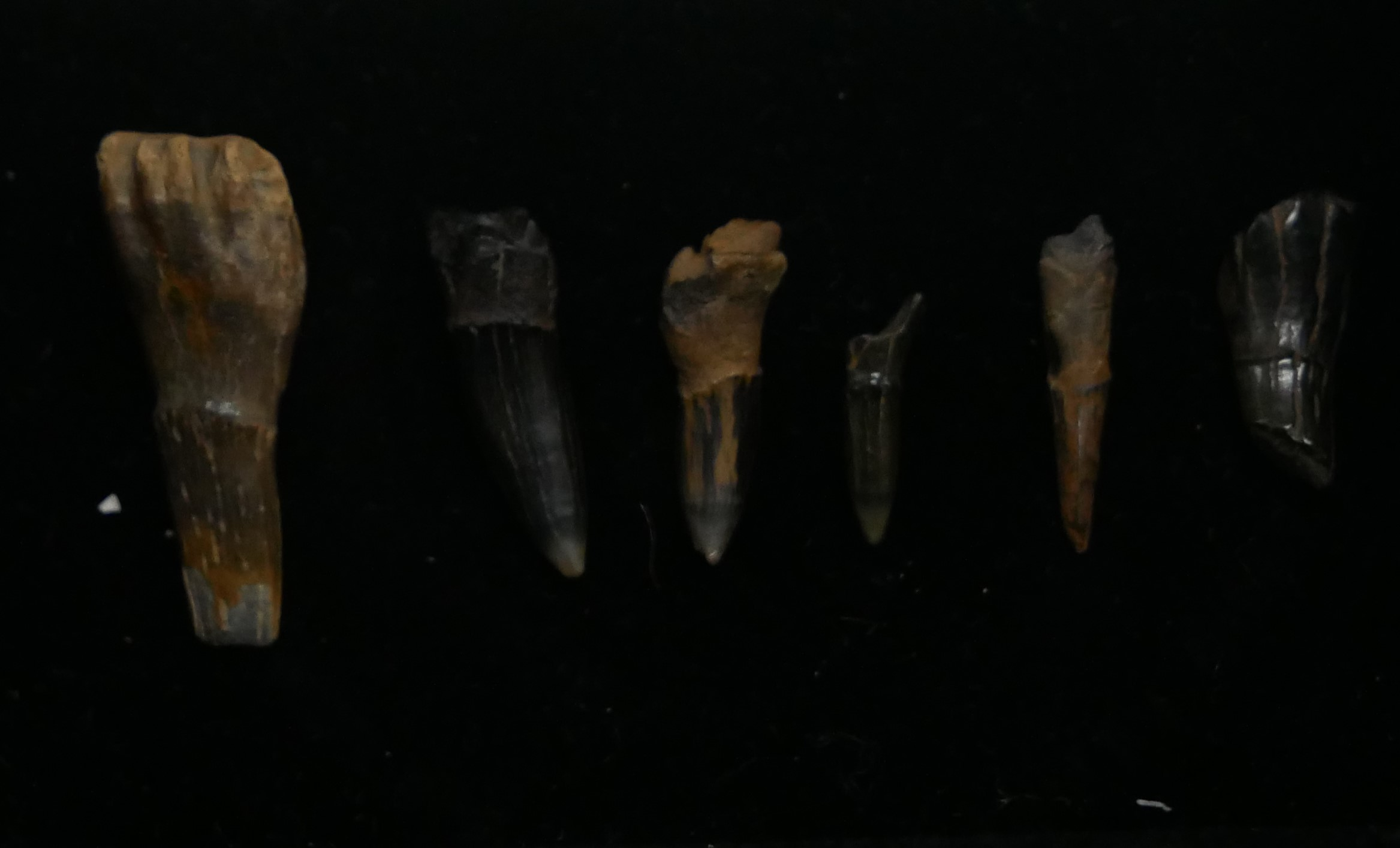
- Ischyrhiza mira rostral spines

Scientific classification
- Kingdom: Animalia
- Phylum: Chordata
- Class: Chondrichthyes
- Subclass: Elasmobranchii
- Order: Rajiformes
- Suborder: †Sclerorhynchoidei
- Family: †Ischyrhizidae; Cope, 1875
- Genus: †Ischyrhiza; Leidy, 1856

Type species
- †Ischyrhiza mira Leidy, 1856

Species
- †I. antiquus; †I. avonicola Estes, 1964; †I. marrocanus; †I. mira Leidy, 1856; †I. stromeri; †I. texana Cappetta & Case 1975; †I. serra Nessov, 1997; †I. nigeriensis Tabaste, 1963; †I. hartenbergeri Cappetta, 1975; †I. germaniae Weiler & Albers, 1964; †I. viaudi Cappetta, 1981; †I. antiqua (Leidy, 1856); †I. radiata (Clark, 1895)

= Ischyrhiza =

Ischyrhiza Temporal range: Late Cretaceous

Extinct genus of cartilaginous fishes

Ischyrhiza is an extinct genus of sclerorhynchoid ray from the Late Cretaceous (Cenomanian-Maastrichtian).

Life restoration of I. avonicola

It had a large, toothed rostrum closely resembling that of a modern-day sawfish. Despite formerly being classified within a family of extinct sawfish-like rays known as Sclerorhynchidae, phylogenetic analyses indicate that Ischyrhiza, Schizorhiza, and Onchopristis form a distinct clade that groups closer with the extant family Rajidae, which contains the true skates, possibly rendering the suborder Sclerorhynchoidei paraphyletic.

Fossils of the genus have been found in Canada, the United States, the Aguja Formation of Mexico, the Bissekty Formation of Uzbekistan, the Tamayama Formation of Japan, the Dukamaje Formation of Niger, the El Molino Formation of Bolivia, the Quiriquina Formation of Chile, and the Chota Formation of Peru.
