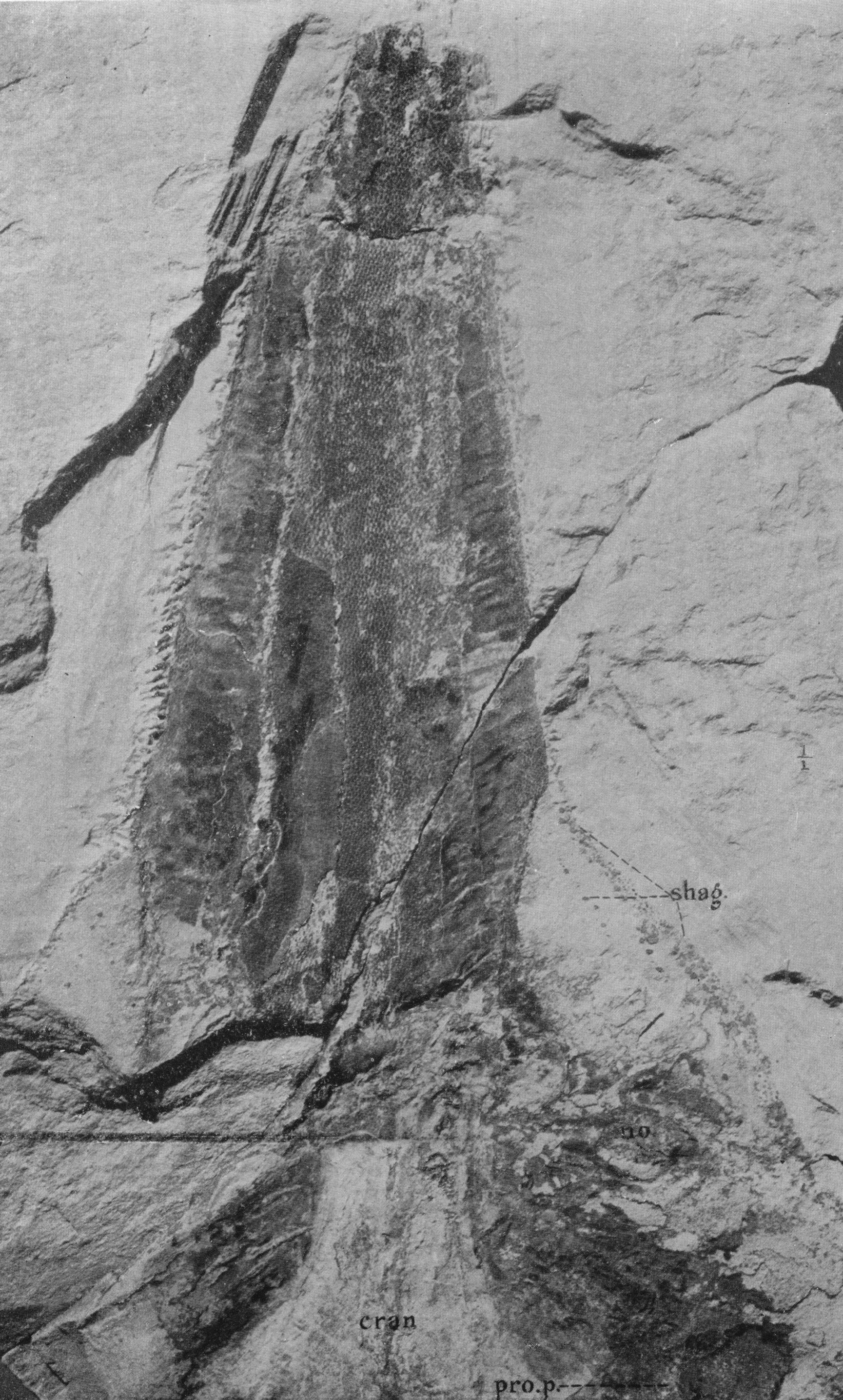
- Micropristis solomonis rostrum

Scientific classification
- Domain: Eukaryota
- Kingdom: Animalia
- Phylum: Chordata
- Class: Chondrichthyes
- Subclass: Elasmobranchii
- Order: Rajiformes
- Suborder: †Sclerorhynchoidei
- Family: †Ganopristidae
- Genus: †Micropristis; Cappetta, 1980
- Species: †M. solomonis

Binomial name
- †Micropristis solomonis (Hay, 1903)

Synonyms
- Sclerorhynchus solomonis Hay, 1903; Sclerorhynchus sentus Hay, 1903; Sclerorhynchus germaniae Albers & Weiler, 1964

= Micropristis =

Micropristis Temporal range: Cenomanian-Campanian

Extinct genus of cartilaginous fishes

Micropristis is an extinct genus of ganopristid sclerorhynchoid that lived in the Middle East and Europe during the Late Cretaceous. The type specimen is known from the Cenomanian of Lebanon, and other specimens referrable to this genus have been found in Santonian-Campanian age rocks of Europe.
