= Walking with Dinosaurs (disambiguation) =

Walking with Dinosaurs is a television documentary series produced by the BBC in 1999.

Walking with Dinosaurs may also refer to:

- Walking with Dinosaurs (film), 2013
- Walking with Dinosaurs (video game), 2013
- Walking with Dinosaurs (2025 TV series)

== See also ==
- Walking with...
