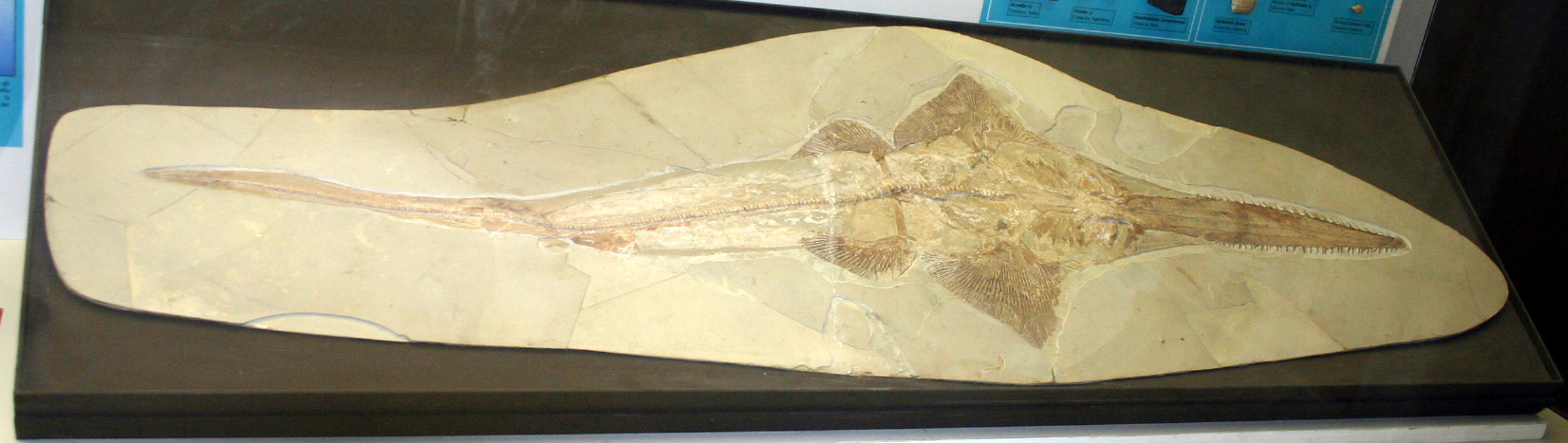
- L. hiram fossil

Scientific classification
- Kingdom: Animalia
- Phylum: Chordata
- Class: Chondrichthyes
- Subclass: Elasmobranchii
- Order: Rajiformes
- Suborder: †Sclerorhynchoidei
- Family: †Ganopristidae
- Genus: †Libanopristis; Cappetta, 1980
- Species: †L. hiram

Binomial name
- †Libanopristis hiram (Hay, 1903)

Synonyms
- Sclerorhynchus hiram Hay, 1903; Rhinobatus eretes Hay, 1903

= Libanopristis =

Libanopristis Temporal range: Cenomanian

Extinct genus of cartilaginous fishes

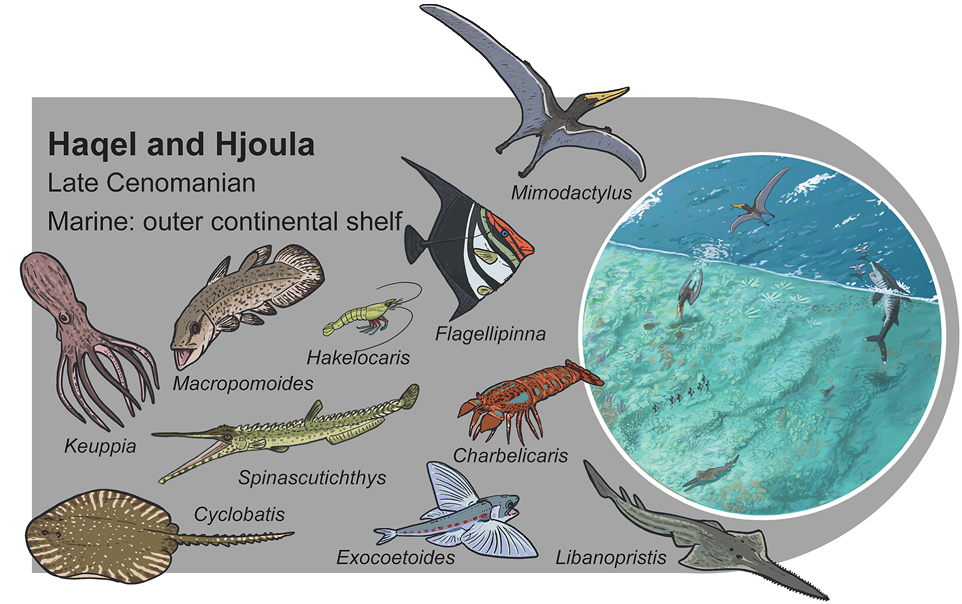
Fauna and depositional environment of the coeval Hakel and Hjoula localities, including Libanopristis

Libanopristis is an extinct genus of ganopristid sclerorhynchoid that lived in Lebanon during the Late Cretaceous. One female specimen with nine embryos preserved in situ represents one of the first fossil evidence of batoid ovoviviparity.
