= Ctenopristis =

Ctenopristis Temporal range: Maastrichtian

Scientific classification
- Kingdom: Animalia
- Phylum: Chordata
- Class: Chondrichthyes
- Subclass: Elasmobranchii
- Order: Rajiformes
- Suborder: †Sclerorhynchoidei
- Genus: †Ctenopristis; Arambourg, 1940
- Species: †C. nougareti

Binomial name
- †Ctenopristis nougareti Arambourg, 1940

Genus of cartilaginous fishes

Ctenopristis is a genus of sclerorhynchoid whose fossils are found in rocks dating from the Maastrichtian stage in Jordan. The anterior teeth of Ctenopristis have a high cusp compared to certain other ancient sawfish genera.

== See also ==
- Flora and fauna of the Maastrichtian stage
- List of prehistoric cartilaginous fish (Chondrichthyes)
