= Ankistrorhynchus =

Ankistrorhynchus Temporal range: Santonian– Campanian

Scientific classification
- Kingdom: Animalia
- Phylum: Chordata
- Class: Chondrichthyes
- Subclass: Elasmobranchii
- Order: Rajiformes
- Suborder: †Sclerorhynchoidei
- Genus: †Ankistrorhynchus; Casier, 1964

Species
- Ankistrorhynchus lonzeensis; Ankistrorhynchus major; Ankistrorhynchus washakiensis

Cretaceous Sclerorhynchid from Belgium

Ankistrorhynchus is an extinct genus of sclerorhynchoid from the Cretaceous Period. It is known only isolated rostral teeth from two species. A. lonzeensis is named for its type locality of Lonzée, Belgium. It is from the lower Santonian stage. A. washakiensis was described from the Campanian-aged Mesaverde Formation of Wyoming, USA. The species A. major was named from Campanian/Santonian of New Jersey, USA off of fragmentary material, thus making its validity questionable.
