= Argoubia =

Argoubia Temporal range: Eocene– Oligocene

Scientific classification
- Kingdom: Animalia
- Phylum: Chordata
- Class: Chondrichthyes
- Subclass: Elasmobranchii
- Order: Myliobatiformes
- Family: Mobulidae
- Genus: †Argoubia; Adnet et al., 2012

Species
- Argoubia barbei; Argoubia arnoldmülleri

Argoubia is an extinct genus of devil ray from the Paleogene period. It is named for the town of El Argoub, Morocco. The type species, A. barbei, is from the Priabonian-aged Samlat formation of Morocco. The specific epithet honors Mr. Gérard Barb who helped collect the first specimens of this species. A. arnoldmülleri is a second species from the middle Oligocene Böhlen Formation of the Zwenkau lignite mines of Germany. It is named for Dr. Arnold Müller, curator of Palaeontological and Geological collections at Leipzig University.
