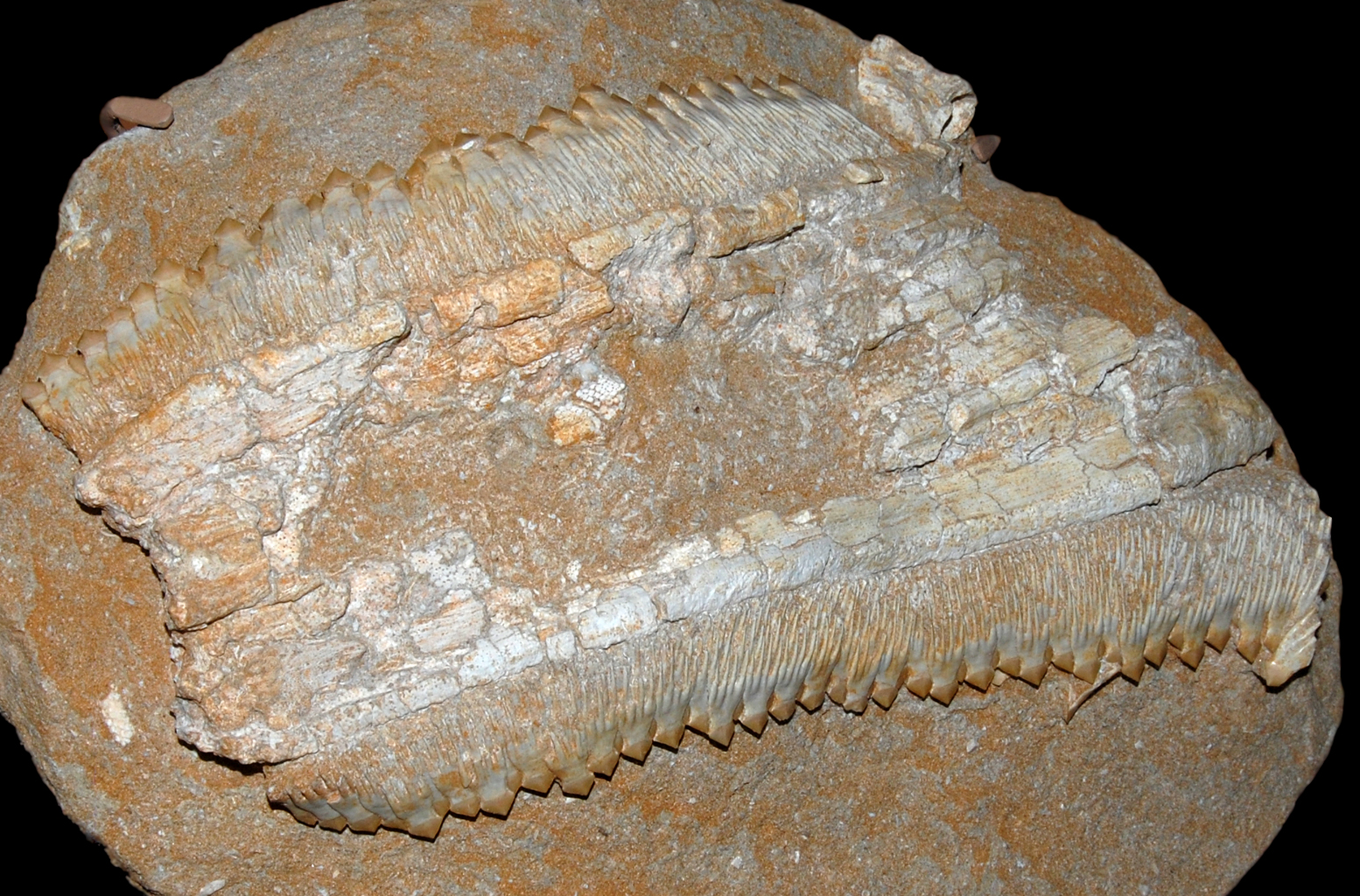
- Schizorhiza stromeri rostrum

Scientific classification
- Kingdom: Animalia
- Phylum: Chordata
- Class: Chondrichthyes
- Subclass: Elasmobranchii
- Order: Rajiformes
- Suborder: †Sclerorhynchoidei
- Family: †Schizorhizidae
- Genus: †Schizorhiza; Weiler, 1930
- Species: †S. stromeri

Binomial name
- †Schizorhiza stromeri Weiler, 1930

Synonyms
- Schizorhiza weileri Serra, 1933

= Schizorhiza =

Schizorhiza Temporal range: Campanian–Maastrichtian

Extinct genus of cartilaginous fishes

Schizorhiza is an extinct genus of schizorhizid sclerorhynchoid that lived during the Late Cretaceous. It contains one valid species, Schizorhiza stromeri. It lived from the Campanian to Maastrichtian, and its fossils have been found in Africa, the Middle East, North America, and South America.

== Taxonomy ==
Schizorhiza stromeri was named by Wilhelm Weiler in 1930 for rostral denticles from the Nubian Sandstone of Egypt. The species was named in honor of Ernst Stromer. A second species, S. weileri, was named by Giselda Serra in 1933 for rostral denticles from Libya. It is considered a junior synonym of S. stromeri.

== Description ==
Schizorhiza is characterized by its robust rostrum with over 1,800 denticles arranged in dense batteries, which form a continuous cutting edge along each side. Each denticle was replaced by a series of smaller denticles nested inside its roots and new rows of denticles grew from the end of the rostrum. Among sclerorhynchoids, this denticle arrangement and replacement system is only found in Schizorhiza and its close relative Harranahynchus. The rostrum was likely used for swiping and slicing prey like sawfishes and has earned Schizorhiza the common name of "slasher ray".
