= Agaleorhynchus =

Agaleorhynchus Temporal range: Santonian – Campanian

Scientific classification
- Domain: Eukaryota
- Kingdom: Animalia
- Phylum: Chordata
- Class: Chondrichthyes
- Subclass: Elasmobranchii
- Order: Rajiformes
- Suborder: †Sclerorhynchoidei
- Genus: †Agaleorhynchus; Guinot et al., 2012
- Species: †A. britannicus

Binomial name
- †Agaleorhynchus britannicus Guinot et al., 2012

Extinct genus of Catshark

Agaleorhynchus is an extinct genus of sclerorhynchoid from the Cretaceous period. It is named after Professor Andy Gale, in recognition of his work on Cretaceous chalk stratigraphy. It is known from a single species, A. britannicus, which is currently restricted to the middle Santonian to early Campanian of southern England.
