= Duffinselache =

Duffinselache Temporal range: Late Triassic, Rhaetian

Scientific classification
- Kingdom: Animalia
- Phylum: Chordata
- Class: Chondrichthyes
- Subclass: Elasmobranchii
- Division: Selachii
- Genus: †Duffinselache; Andreev & Cuny, 2012
- Species: †D. holwellensis

Binomial name
- †Duffinselache holwellensis (Duffin, 1998)

Synonyms
- †Polyacrodus holwellensi Duffin, 1998

Extinct genus of cartilaginous fish

Duffinselache (Duffin's shark) is an extinct genus of basal shark elasmobranchii cartilaginous fish, known from a single species, Duffinselache holwellensis, collected from the Late Triassic (Rhaetian stage) of England. It was first named by Duffin in 1998 as a species of Polyacrodus. Plamen S. Andreev and Gilles Cuny in 2012 reassigned it to a new genus as its type species, Polyacrodus holwellensis.
