= Australopristis =

Australopristis Temporal range: Campanian – Maastrichtian

Scientific classification
- Kingdom: Animalia
- Phylum: Chordata
- Class: Chondrichthyes
- Order: Rajiformes
- Suborder: Sclerorhynchoidei
- Genus: Australopristis Martill and Ibrahim, 2012

Type species
- †Australopristis wiffeni Martill and Ibrahim, 2012

Synonyms
- Onchopristis dunklei praecursor Thurmond, 1971

Extinct sawfish genus

Australopristis is an extinct genus of sclerorhynchoid fish from the late Cretaceous epoch. Its name is derived from the Latin for "southern" and the Greek for "saw". It is known from a single species, A. wiffeni named for the late prominent fossil hunter Joan Wiffen. This species is currently known only from rostral teeth found at Mangahouanga stream and East Wing, Haumuri bluff, New Zealand. Its rostral teeth possess a smooth root which makes it unique among sclerorhynchoids. Rostral teeth appear to vary in morphology according to position and ontogenetic stage. Unlike the related Onchopristis and Atlanticopristis, it lives in a marine rather than fluvial environment and likely preferred cooler waters.
