= Odontaspis watinensis =

Odontaspis watinensis Temporal range: Turonian

Scientific classification
- Kingdom: Animalia
- Phylum: Chordata
- Class: Chondrichthyes
- Subclass: Elasmobranchii
- Division: Selachii
- Order: Lamniformes
- Family: Odontaspididae
- Genus: Odontaspis
- Species: †O. watinensis

Binomial name
- †Odontaspis watinensis Cook et al., 2013

Extinct species of shark

Odontaspis watinensis is an extinct species of Odontaspis that lived during the early Turonian stage of the Late Cretaceous epoch.

== Distribution ==
Odontaspis watinensis is known from the Kaskapau Formation of northwestern Alberta.
