= Ptychotrygonidae =

Ptychotrygonidae Temporal range: Albian–Maastrichtian

Scientific classification
- Kingdom: Animalia
- Phylum: Chordata
- Class: Chondrichthyes
- Subclass: Elasmobranchii
- Order: Rajiformes
- Suborder: †Sclerorhynchoidei
- Family: †Ptychotrygonidae; Kriwet, Nunn, & Klug, 2009

Genera
- †Archingeayia; †Asflapristis; †Ptychotrygon; †Ptychotrygonoides; †Texatrygon

Extinct family of cartilaginous fishes

Ptychotrygonidae is an extinct family of cartilaginous fish from the Cretaceous period belonging to the suborder Sclerorhynchoidei. This family contains the genera Archingeayia, Asflapristis, Ptychotrygon, Ptychotrygonoides, and Texatrygon.
