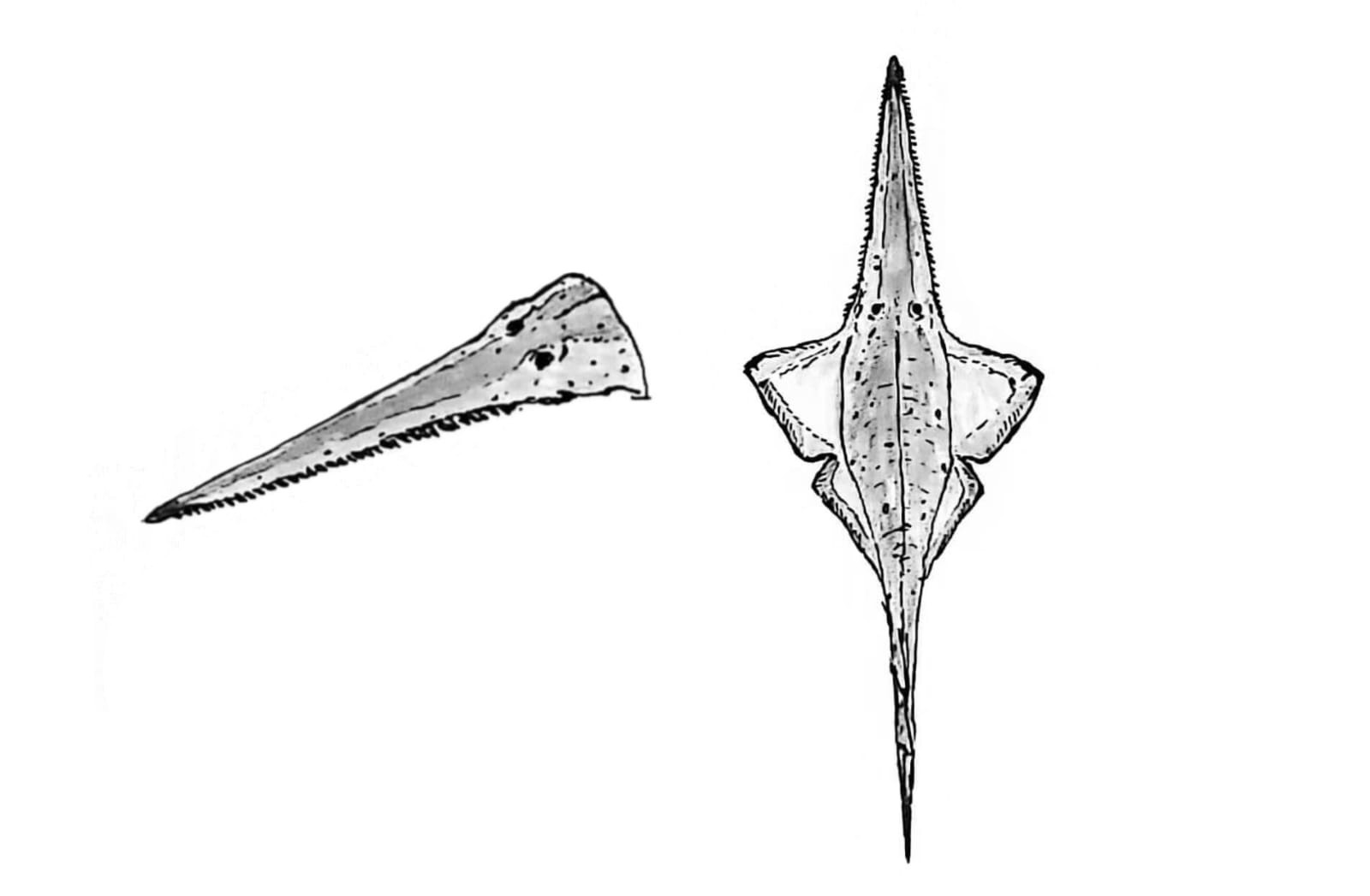
- Life restoration of Sclerorhynchus atavus

Scientific classification
- Kingdom: Animalia
- Phylum: Chordata
- Class: Chondrichthyes
- Subclass: Elasmobranchii
- Order: Rajiformes
- Suborder: †Sclerorhynchoidei
- Family: †Ganopristidae
- Genus: †Sclerorhynchus; Woodward, 1889

Type species
- †Sclerorhynchus atavus Woodward, 1889

Other species
- †Sclerorhynchus leptodon (Arambourg, 1935); †Sclerorhynchus pettersi Case & Cappetta, 1997; †Sclerorhynchus fanninensis Cappetta & Case, 1999; †Sclerorhynchus priscus Cappetta & Case, 1999; †Sclerorhynchus karakensis Mustafa, Case, & Zalmout, 2002

Synonyms
- Genus synonymy: Ganopristis Arambourg, 1935; Species synonymy: S. atavus; Squatina crassidens Woodward, 1889; Ganopristis libanica Arambourg, 1940 S. leptodon; Ganopristis leptodon Arambourg, 1935; Sclerorhynchus batavicus Albers & Weiler, 1964

= Sclerorhynchus =

Sclerorhynchus Temporal range: Turonian-Maastrichtian

Extinct genus of cartilaginous fishes

Sclerorhynchus (from Greek: σκληρός scleros, 'hard' and Greek: ῥύγχος rhynchos 'snout') is an extinct genus of ganopristid sclerorhynchoid that lived during the Late Cretaceous. The genus Ganopristis is considered a junior synonym of Sclerorhynchus. It was a widespread genus, with fossils found in the Middle East (S. atavus, S. karakensis), North Africa (S. leptodon), Europe (S. leptodon), and North America (S. fanninensis, S. pettersi, S. priscus). While it had a long rostrum with large denticles similar to sawfishes and sawsharks, its closest living relatives are actually skates. Complete specimens of S. atavus show that its fin arrangement was similar to skates, with the pectoral and pelvic fins touching, both dorsal fins located behind the pelvic fins, and a reduced caudal fin.
