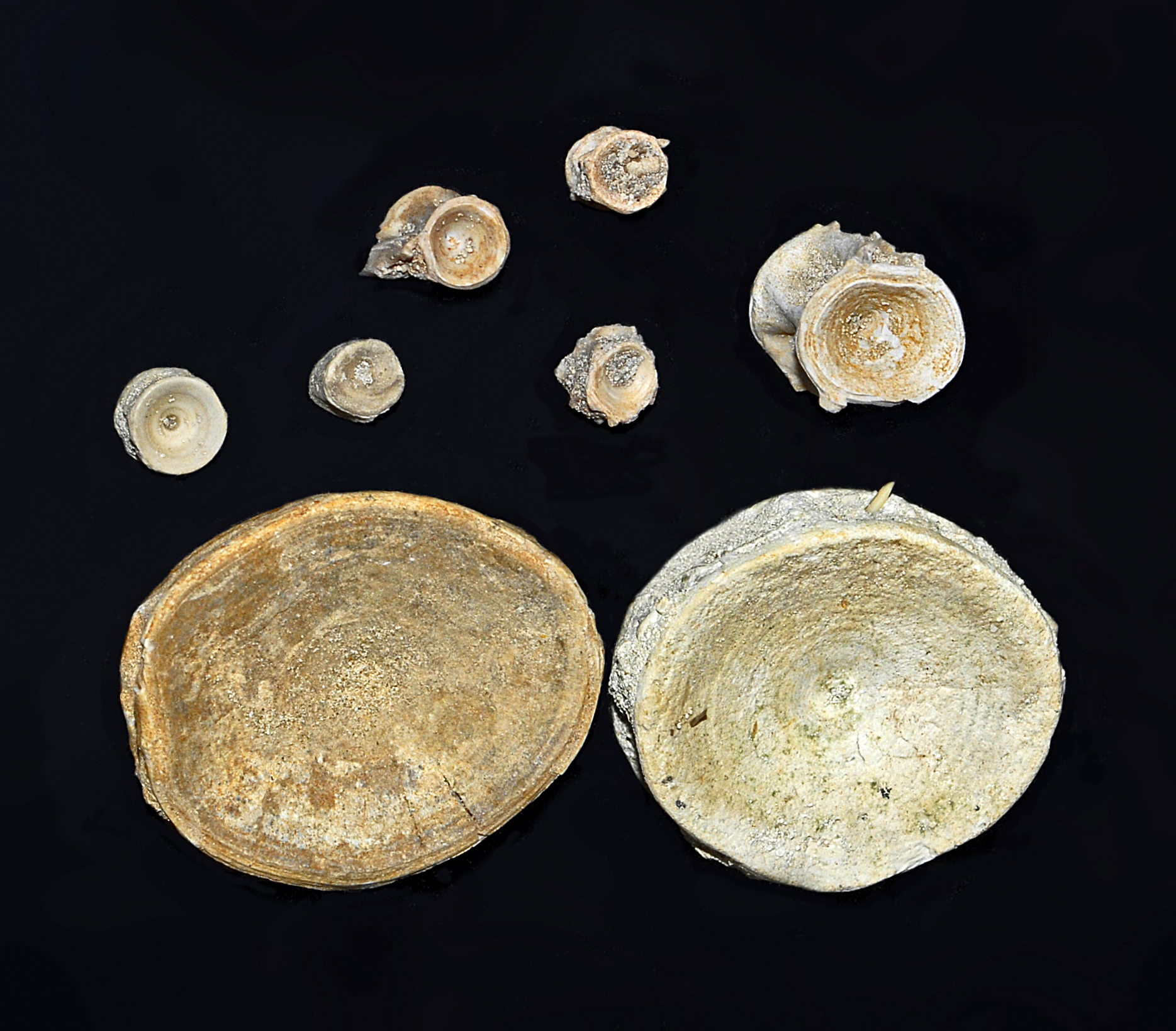
- Fossil vertebrae of Onchosaurus marocanus from Khouribga (Morocco)

Scientific classification
- Kingdom: Animalia
- Phylum: Chordata
- Class: Chondrichthyes
- Subclass: Elasmobranchii
- Order: Rajiformes
- Suborder: †Sclerorhynchoidei
- Genus: †Onchosaurus; Gervais, 1852

Type species
- †Onchosaurus radicalis Gervais, 1852

Species
- †O. marocanus Arambourg, 1935; †O. pharao (Dames, 1887); †O. radicalis Gervais. 1852 (type species)

Synonyms
- Gigantichthys? Dames, 1887; Onchosaurus maroccanus Arambourg, 1935 (sic); Titanichtys pharao Dames, 1887; Ischyrhiza iwakiensis Uyeno & Hasegawa, 1986; Onchosaurus iwakiensis Suárez & Cappetta, 2004; Onchopristis pharao Martill & Ibrahim, 2012

= Onchosaurus =

Onchosaurus Temporal range: Late Cretaceous, 84.9–66.043 Ma

Extinct genus of cartilaginous fishes

Onchosaurus is an extinct genus of sclerorhynchoid fish from the Late Cretaceous (84.9 to 66.043 million years ago). Its fossils have been found in the Cretaceous sediments of Egypt, Brazil, Congo, Morocco, France, Niger, Japan, Colombia, Chile, Peru and the United States.

== Description ==
These sclerorhynchid sawskates are only known by isolated vertebra and rostral spines. On the basis of fossil findings they are considered large, bottom-dwelling fishes, mainly inhabiting shallow marine habitats, but they were also powerful swimmers.

== Species ==
Species within this genus include:

- Onchosaurus marocanus Arambourg, 1935
- Onchosaurus pharao (Dames, 1887)
- Onchosaurus radicalis Gervais, 1852
