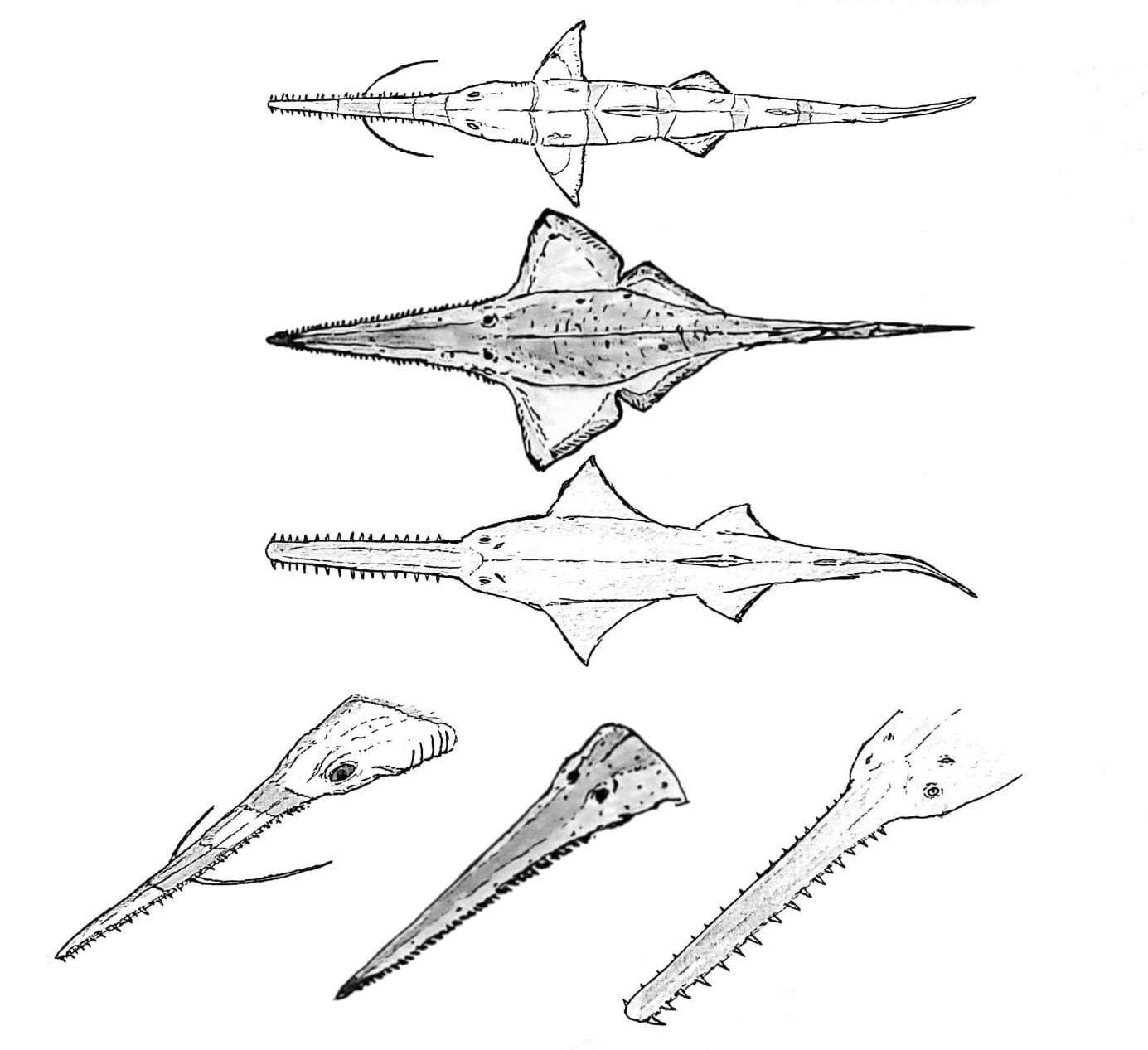
- Comparison between a longnose sawshark (top and left), Sclerorhynchus (middle), and a largetooth sawfish (bottom and right)

Scientific classification
- Kingdom: Animalia
- Phylum: Chordata
- Class: Chondrichthyes
- Subclass: Elasmobranchii
- Order: Rajiformes
- Suborder: †Sclerorhynchoidei; Cappetta, 1980

Families
- †Ganopristidae; †Ischyrhizidae; †Onchopristidae; †Ptychotrygonidae; †Schizorhizidae

Synonyms
- Ganopristinidea Case, 1978; Sclerorhynchiformes Kriwet, 2004; Ganopristiformes Herman & Van Waes, 2012a; Ptychotrygoniformes Herman & Van Waes, 2012b; Ganopristomorphii Herman & Van Waes, 2014

= Sclerorhynchoidei =

Sclerorhynchoidei Temporal range: Barremian-Maastrichtian

Extinct suborder of cartilaginous fishes

Sclerorhynchoidei is an extinct suborder of rajiform rays that had long rostra with large denticles similar to sawfishes and sawsharks. This feature was convergently evolved, recently proposed as 'pristification', and their closest living relatives are actually skates. While they are often called "sawfishes", sawskates is a more accurate common name proposed in 2021 for sclerorhynchoids, which has been subsequently used by other researchers.

The suborder contains five named families: Ganopristidae, Ischyrhizidae, Onchopristidae, Ptychotrygonidae, and Schizorhizidae. Several genera (see below) are not currently placed in any of these families. Sclerorhynchoids first appeared in the Barremian and went extinct during the Cretaceous–Paleogene extinction event, with former Paleocene occurrences being misidentifications or reworked specimens. One female specimen of Libanopristis with nine embryos preserved in situ represents one of the first fossil evidence of batoid ovoviviparity.

== Phylogeny ==
Below is a cladogram of Sclerorhynchoidei, with the topology based on Villalobos-Segura et al. (2021b) and the family taxonomy based on Greenfield (2021).

- Rajiformes
  - Rajidae
  - Sclerorhynchoidei
    - Schizorhizidae
      Schizorhiza
    - - - Ischyrhizidae
          Ischyrhiza
        - Onchopristidae
          Onchopristis
      - - Ptychotrygonidae
          - Asflapristis
          - Ptychotrygon
        - Ganopristidae
          - Libanopristis
          - Micropristis
          - Sclerorhynchus

== Other genera ==
- †Agaleorhynchus
- †Ankistrorhynchus
- †Atlanticopristis
- †Australopristis
- †Baharipristis
- †Biropristis
- †Borodinopristis
- †Celtipristis
- †Columbusia
- †Ctenopristis
- †Dalpiazia
- †Iberotrygon
- †Kiestus
- †Marckgrafia
- †Onchosaurus
- †Plicatopristis
- †Pucapristis
- †Renpetia
