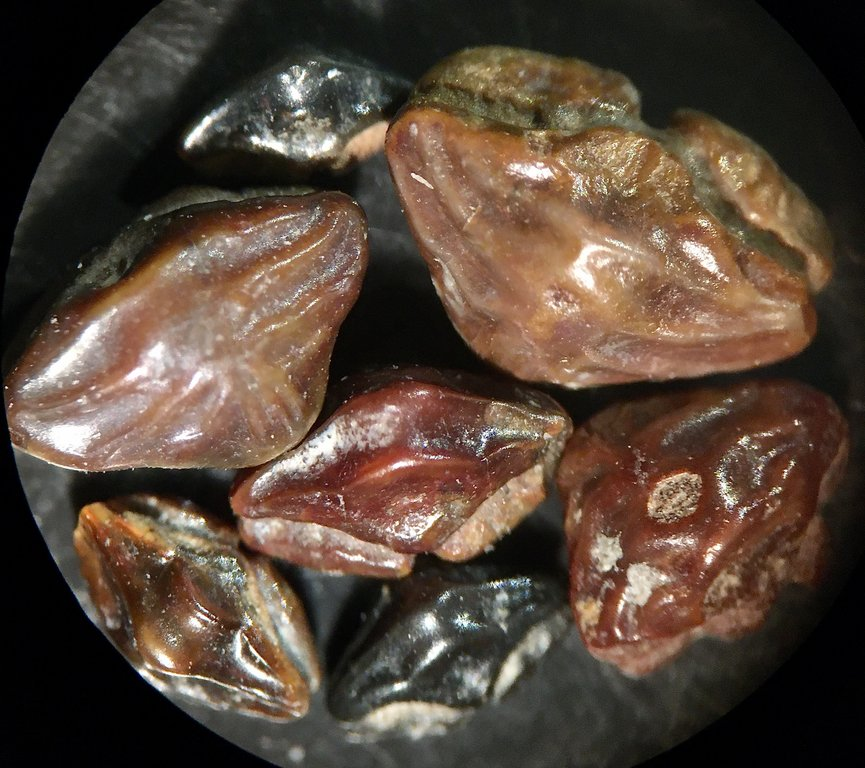
- Ptychotrygon sp. oral teeth from the Cretaceous of Texas, USA

Scientific classification
- Kingdom: Animalia
- Phylum: Chordata
- Class: Chondrichthyes
- Subclass: Elasmobranchii
- Order: Rajiformes
- Suborder: †Sclerorhynchoidei
- Family: †Ptychotrygonidae
- Genus: †Ptychotrygon; Jaekel, 1894

Species
- See text.

= Ptychotrygon =

Ptychotrygon Temporal range: Albian–Maastrichtian

Extinct genus of cartilaginous fishes

Ptychotrygon is a genus of sawfish-like ray whose fossils have been found worldwide from the Cretaceous period (Albian-Maastrichtian). Along with Ptychotrygonoides, Texatrygon, and Asflapristis, it is the member of the family Ptychotrygonidae within the suborder Sclerorhynchoidei.

== Species ==
The following species are considered valid:

- †Ptychotrygon ameghinorum
- †Ptychotrygon blainensis
- †Ptychotrygon eutawensis
- †Ptychotrygon geyeri
- †Ptychotrygon mcnultyi
- †Ptychotrygon nazeensis
- †Ptychotrygon pustulata
- †Ptychotrygon rostrispatula
- †Ptychotrygon striata
- †Ptychotrygon triangularis
- †Ptychotrygon vermiculata
