= David Ward (palaeontologist) =

British palaeontologist (born 1948)

David J. Ward (born 10 October 1948, in London) is a British palaeontologist.

Ward worked for 14 years as a veterinary surgeon while being an amateur palaeontologist and taking part in several expeditions to Africa. In 1988 he retired from medicine to devote himself completely to palaeontology. He travelled extensively in Europe, Africa, Australia, and the Americas, as well as to Uzbekistan, Russia and Kazakhstan.

Ward published over 50 scientific articles and co-authored a bestselling book, Fossils (Smithsonian Handbook series).

Ward was the 2007 Skinner Award recipient.
