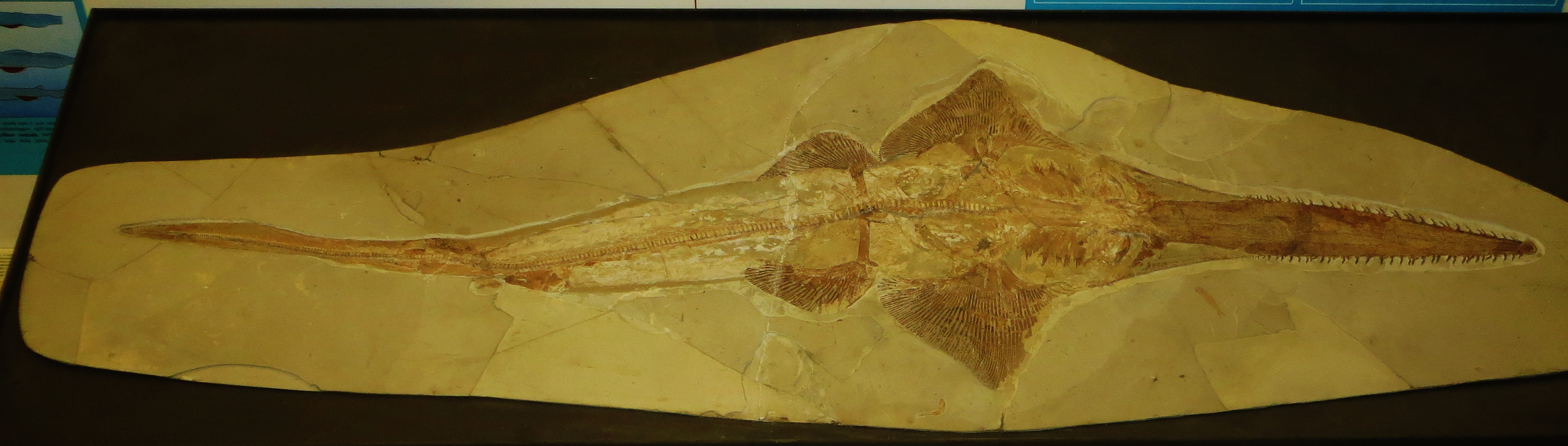
- Libanopristis hiram

Scientific classification
- Kingdom: Animalia
- Phylum: Chordata
- Class: Chondrichthyes
- Subclass: Elasmobranchii
- Order: Rajiformes
- Suborder: †Sclerorhynchoidei
- Family: †Ganopristidae; Arambourg, 1940

Genera
- †Libanopristis; †Micropristis; †Sclerorhynchus (=Ganopristis)

Synonyms
- Sclerorhynchidae Arambourg, 1952

= Ganopristidae =

Ganopristidae Temporal range: Cenomanian-Maastrichtian

Extinct family of cartilaginous fishes

Ganopristidae is an extinct family of cartilaginous fish from the Cretaceous belonging to the suborder Sclerorhynchoidei. While the name Sclerorhynchidae is often used for this family, it is a junior synonym of Ganopristidae. This family contains the genera Libanopristis, Micropristis, and Sclerorhynchus. The type genus Ganopristis is considered to be a junior synonym of Sclerorhynchus.
