= Lueders Formation =

Geologic formation in Texas, United States

- Stratigraphic range: Early Permian
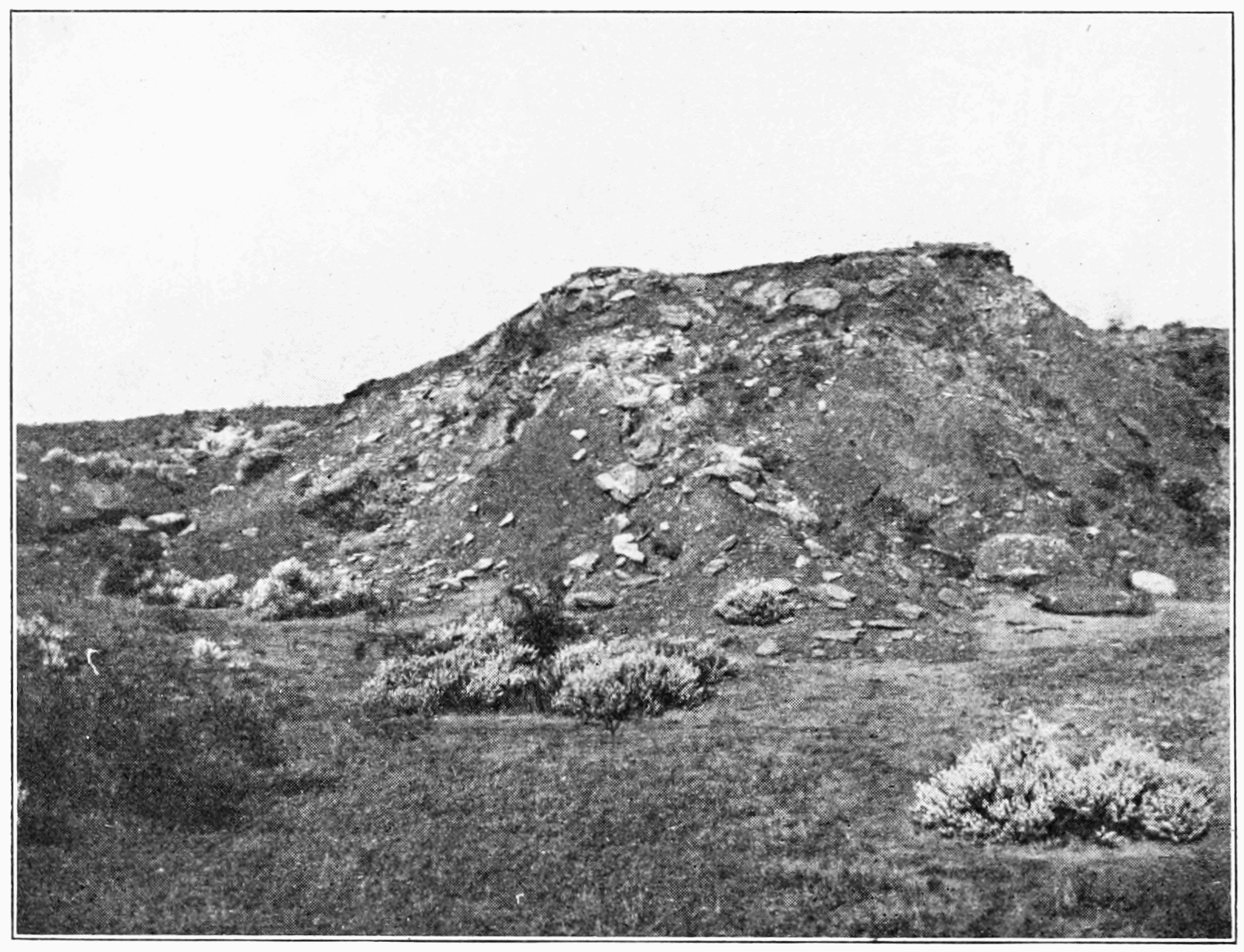
- Exposure in Wilbarger County, Texas (1908).
- Type: Geological formation
- Unit of: Albany Group
- Sub-units: Lake Kemp Limestone; Maybelle Limestone
- Underlies: Clear Fork Group
- Overlies: Talpa Formation
- Thickness: 50 to 70 feet

Lithology
- Primary: Interbedded shale & limestone

Location
- Region: Texas
- Country: United States

Type section
- Named for: Lueders, Texas

The Lueders Formation is a geologic formation in Texas. It is the top formation of the Albany Group and preserves fossils dating back to the Permian period.

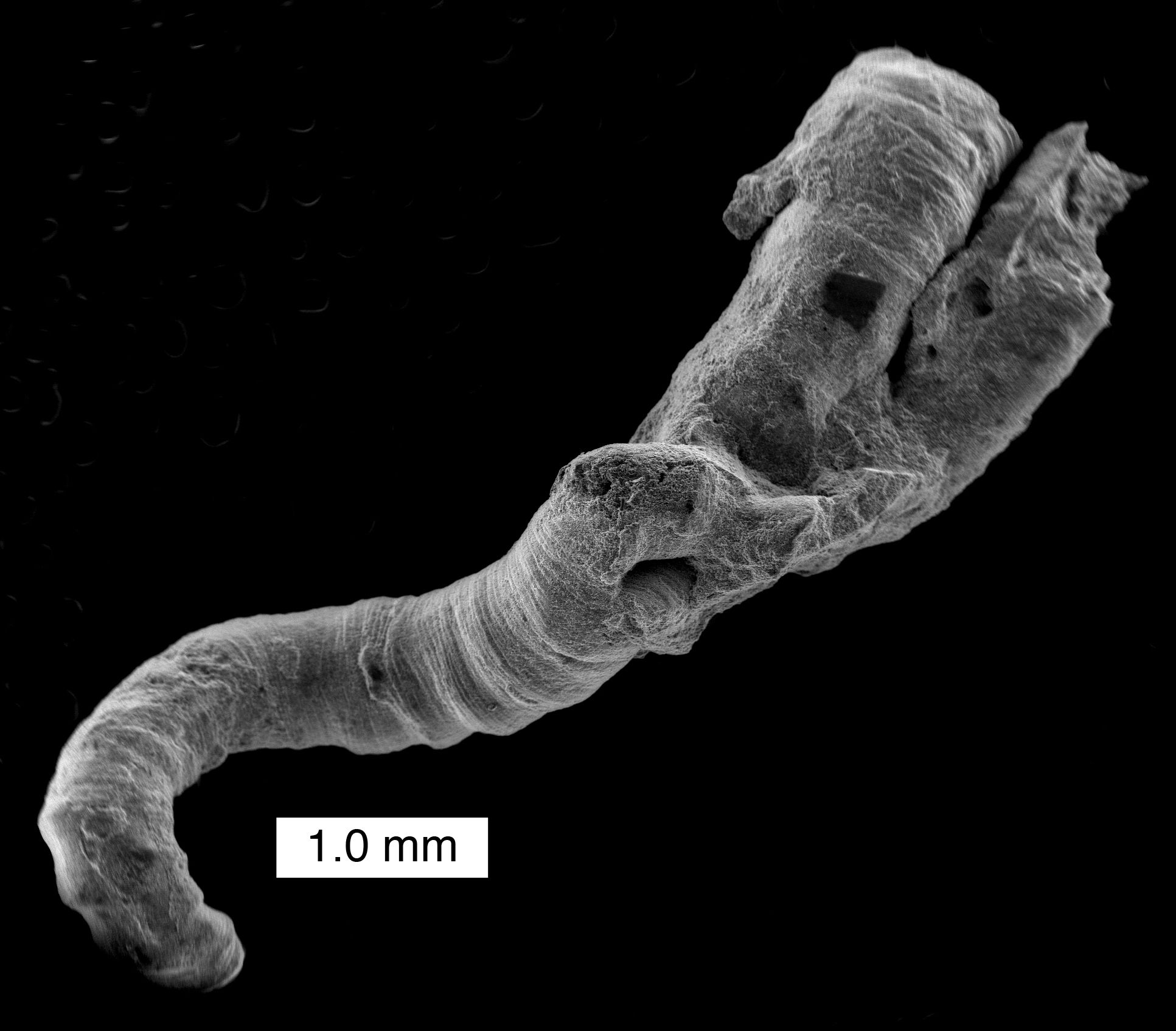
Helicoconchus elongatus, a microconchid from the Lueders Formation of Texas.

== Description ==
=== Paleogeography ===
At the time of deposition, a broad sea connected to the Panthalassic Ocean covered much of the central United States, including Texas. The Lueders Formation would have been located in the northern tropics or subtropics. Climatically, after the retreat of an early Artinskian glacial maximum, the deserts of the North American craton experienced fluctuation and growth during this time period, and the associated aridity decrease impacted seabed deposition in localities across the basin.

=== Depositional environment ===
The Lueders Formation represents a deltaic environment, with terrestrial sediments being deposited onto the muddy bottom of a shallow estuary by shifting freshwater streams. In the Maybelle Member, the dolomite likely represents marine deposits, preserving marine sharks and fish, whereas darker terrestrial sediments and freshwater shale deposits contain remains of land animals and freshwater fish respectively.

== Fossil content ==
=== Amphibians ===
Amphibians reported from the Lueders Formation
Genus	Species	Presence	Material	Notes	Images
Crossotelos	C. annulatus	Maybelle Member.	Multiple specimens.	A nectridean.	
Diplocaulus	D. magnicornis	Maybelle Member.	Multiple specimens.	A nectridean.	
Eryops	E. megacephalus	Maybelle Member.	Limb & skull elements.	An eryopid.	
Trimerorhachis	T. sp.	Maybelle Member.	Limb & skull elements.	A dvinosaur.	

=== Fish ===
==== Acanthodians ====
Acanthodians reported from the Lueders Formation
Genus	Species	Presence	Material	Notes	Images
Acanthodes	A. sp.	Maybelle Member.	A fin spine.	An acanthodiform, known from freshwater deposits.	

==== Bony fish ====
Bony fish reported from the Lueders Formation
Genus	Species	Presence	Material	Notes	Images
"Acrolepis"		Maybelle Member.	Scales.	A palaeonisciform.	
Gnathorhiza	G. serrata	Maybelle Member.	Jaw elements & near-complete specimen.	A lungfish from freshwater deposits.	
Lawnia	L. cf. L. taylorensis	Maybelle Member.	Remains of millions of individuals.	A palaeonisciform originally reported as 'Lawnia-like', now thought to represent the genus itself.	
Luederia	L. kempi	Maybelle Member.	A braincase & 2 large cleithra.	A marine palaeonisciform.	
?Platysomus	?P. palmaris	Maybelle Member.	Partial bodies & numerous scales.	A marine (?) palaeonisciform.	
Sagenodus		Maybelle Member.	Upper tooth plate (UCLA VP 431).	A lungfish.	
Schaefferichthys	S. leudersensis	Maybelle Member.	Incomplete specimen (USNM 23109).	A freshwater palaeonisciform.	
?Spermatodus	?S. pustulosus	Maybelle Member.	Multiple specimens.	A coelacanth.	

==== Cartilaginous fish ====
Cartilaginous fish reported from the Lueders Formation
Genus	Species	Presence	Material	Notes	Images
Acrodus	?A. olsoni		Teeth.	A hybodont.	
Acrodus	?A. sweetlacruzensis		Teeth.	A hybodont.	
Barbclabornia	B. luedersensis		Numerous teeth.	A giant freshwater xenacanth.	
Ctenacanthus	C. cf. C. amblyxiphias	Maybelle Member.	Fin spines.	A ctenacanth found in the marine dolomite.	
Janassa	J. sp.	Maybelle Member.	Isolated teeth.	A petalodont found in the marine dolomite.	
Orthacanthus	O. platypternus		Teeth.	A freshwater xenacanth.	
Orthacanthus	O. texensis		Teeth.	A freshwater xenacanth.	
Polyacrodus	P. wichitaensis		Teeth.	A hybodont.	
Polyacrodus	P. zideki		Teeth.	A hybodont.	
Xenacanthus	?X. slaughteri		Teeth.	A freshwater xenacanth.	
Xenacanthus	X. sp.	Maybelle Member.	A tooth.	A freshwater xenacanth.	

=== Synapsids ===
Synapsids reported from the Lueders Formation
Genus	Species	Presence	Material	Notes	Images
Dimetrodon	D. sp.	Maybelle Member.	Neural spine & bone fragments.	A sphenacodontid.	

=== Invertebrates ===
==== Arthropods ====
Arthropods reported from the Lueders Formation
Genus	Species	Presence	Material	Notes	Images
Ostracoda indet.	Indeterminate		WSU 1445.	A fragmentary ostracod.	
Panduralimulus	P. babcocki	Maybelle Member.	Multiple specimens.	A horseshoe crab.	

==== Bivalves ====
Bivalves reported from the Lueders Formation
Genus	Species	Presence	Material	Notes	Images
Myalinella	M. sp.		Valves (WSU 1407).	A myalinid.	
Pinnidae indet.	Indeterminate		Shell.	An unknown pen shell.	

==== Bryozoans ====
Bryozoans reported from the Lueders Formation
Genus	Species	Presence	Material	Notes	Images
Bryozoa indet.	Indeterminate		WSU 1430.	A fragmentary bryozoan.	

==== Cephalopods ====
Cephalopods reported from the Lueders Formation
Genus	Species	Presence	Material	Notes	Images
Koninckioceras	K. bibbi		Internal mold.	A nautiloid.	
Metacoceras	M. sp.		Shell (WSU 1437).	A nautiloid.	
Michelinoceras	M. sp.		Phragmocone (WSU 1406).	A orthocerid.	
Millkoninckioceras	M. sp.		Shell (WSU 1442).	A nautiloid.	
Perrinitidae indet.	Indeterminate		3 specimens.	An ammonite.	
Stenopoceras	cf. S. whitei		Phragmocone.	A nautiloid.	

==== Echinoderms ====
Echinoderms reported from the Lueders Formation
Genus	Species	Presence	Material	Notes	Images
Crinoidea indet.	Indeterminate		Columnal (WSU1405A).	A fragmentary crinoid.	

=== Plants ===
Plants reported from the Lueders Formation
Genus	Species	Presence	Material	Notes	Images
Tinsleya	T. texana	Maybelle Member.	Numerous specimens.	A pteridosperm.	
Zeilleropteris	Z. wattii		Leaves.	A gigantopterid.	

== See also ==
- List of fossiliferous stratigraphic units in Texas
- Paleontology in Texas
