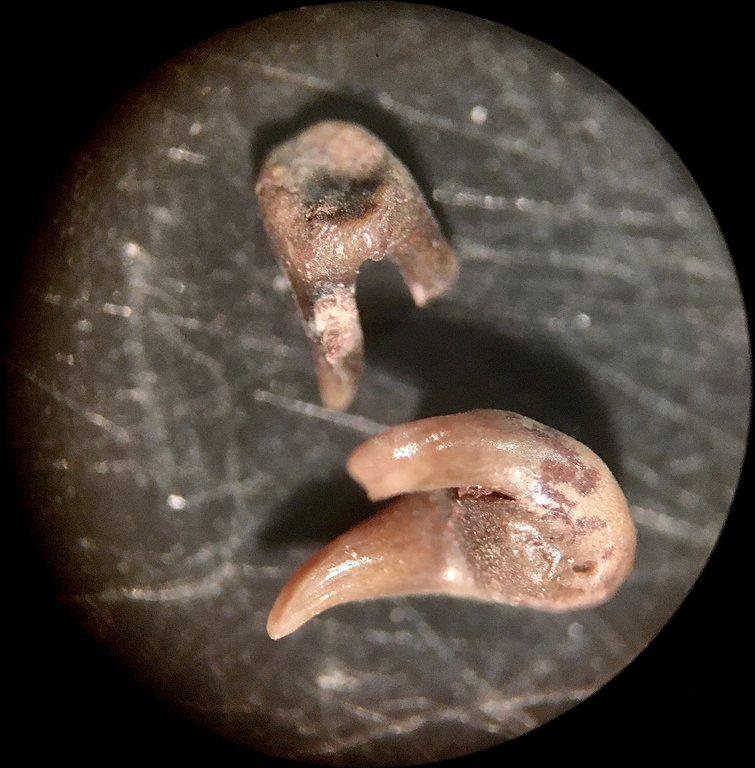
- Barbclabornia luedersensis teeth

Scientific classification
- Kingdom: Animalia
- Phylum: Chordata
- Class: Chondrichthyes
- Subclass: Elasmobranchii
- Infraclass: †Xenacanthimorpha
- Order: †Bransonelliformes
- Genus: †Barbclabornia; Johnson, 2003
- Species: †B. luedersensis

Binomial name
- †Barbclabornia luedersensis Berman 1970

Synonyms {
- †Xenacanthus luedersensis Berman, 1970

= Barbclabornia =

Barbclabornia Temporal range: Asselian – Artinskian

Extinct genus of cartilaginous fishes

Barbclabornia is an extinct genus of xenacanth from the Early Permian and possibly upper Pennsylvanian of North America. The genus contains a single described species: B. luedersensis. It has been found in several places within Asselian and Atinskian formations, including the Clear Fork, Albany, Wichita, and Dunkard Groups. There are possible examples from the Gzhelian-aged Admire, Monongahela, and Conemaugh groups.

== Discovery ==
Barbclabornia was initially only known from isolated teeth, which were assigned to the genus Xenacanthus in 1970 based on the belief that all Upper Paleozoic xenacanthids belonged to said genus. In 2003, X. luedersensis would be reassigned to a new genus after differences in tooth structure were described, and with the discovery of a large palatoquadrate bearing luedersensis teeth at Lake Frederick.

The genus Barbclabornia honors Barbara and Alvie Claborn, who discovered and helped prepare the palatoquadrate respectively.

== Description ==
The teeth of Barbclabornia are similar to those of Bransonella, and as such are believed to be related. They are very small, being between 1–3 mm tall. They are bicuspid, functionally homodont, and characterized by cristated, cylindrical, cone-like cusps. In contrast to other xenacanth species, these teeth have no central cusp. The anterior teeth possess triangular bases, while the lateral and posterolateral teeth have quadrangular bases. These bases are thick, amounting to 30% of the tooth height. Monocuspid denticles, the largest of which being barely over 2 mm tall, are mostly remarkably claw-like in appearance. These denticles are assumed to be from the mucous membrane fold.

Barbclabornia is also known from a right palatoquadrate, which contains hundreds of these tiny teeth. The palatoquadrate is 37.5 cm (14.7 in) long and incomplete, but is assumed to have a total length of 45 cm (17.7 in). The palatoquadrate is thinner than that of other large xenacanthids, like Orthacanthus, and has a lighter build. Based on other xenacanths, if Barbclabornia's total length is 10 to 11 times as long as its jaws, it is estimated to have a total length of 4.5 to 5 m (14 to 15 ft) long. This would make it the largest xenacanthid ever found.

== Paleoecology ==
Based on the locations where a majority of specimens have been found, being freshwater dominant and tetrapod-bearing, Barbclabornia is most likely a freshwater species, inhabiting coastal plains of North America. Combined δ^{18}O_{P} and ^{87}Sr/^{86}Sr measurements confirm that Barbclabornia was a freshwater inhabitant.

The diet of Barbclabornia can be inferred from its teeth, jaws, and size. Paleontologist Gary D. Johnson initially proposed that the shark could only bite down on its prey and swallow it whole. This would give it a diet of less active prey, primarily small fish, amphibians, and arthropods. However, Johnson alongside Jiri Zidek, William May, and Alvie Claborn would instead compare the large xenacanth with numerous tiny teeth to be analogous to modern filter feeding sharks, the Basking Shark and Whale Shark. This would indicate that Barbclabornia was a filter feeder which would primarily consume zooplankton.
