= Plicatodus =

Plicatodus Temporal range: 307–295 Ma

Scientific classification
- Kingdom: Animalia
- Phylum: Chordata
- Class: Chondrichthyes
- Subclass: Elasmobranchii
- Order: †Xenacanthiformes
- Family: †Xenacanthidae
- Genus: †Plicatodus; Hampe, 1995

Species
- P. jordani (Type) (Hampe, 1995); P. plicatus (Fritsch, 1879)

Synonyms
- Orthacanthus plicatus (Fritsch, 1879)

Extinct genus of cartilaginous fishes

Plicatodus is a prehistoric cartilaginous fish in the family Xenacanthidae that lived in Europe during the late Carboniferous and Early Permian Periods. It was described by Oliver Hampe in 1995, and the type species is Plicatodus jordani. The type locality for this genus is the Saar-Nahe basin.

== Description ==
Plicatodus fossils generally only consist of scattered, isolated teeth, with one exception: a partial skeleton that includes the head, dorsal spine, and pectoral girdle.

=== Species ===
The type species for this genus, P. jordani was described in 1995 from Permian-aged material (the Asselian part of the Cisuralian to be specific) found in the upper Odernheim Formation of the Saar–Nahe Basin: a molasse of freshwater and shallow marine deposits from late Carboniferous to the early Permian Periods.

P. plicatus was originally described as a member of the genus Orthacanthus by Karl von Fritsch in 1879. It came from the Kasimovian (Carboniferous) aged Slany Formation in the Rakovnik Basin of Bohemia.

P. sp., found in the Gzhelian (Carboniferous) of Lower Austria is undetermined. While it may represent an undescribed third species, it may just as well come from P. jordani or P. plicatus.
