= Lake Frederick (Oklahoma) =

Reservoir in Oklahoma, United States

Coordinates: 34.529°N 98.880°W

Lake Frederick is a reservoir in Tillman County, Oklahoma. It is located about 15 miles (24 km) northeast of the town of Frederick, which owns it. It was constructed in 1974 for flood control and to provide a water supply. It has a total surface area of 878 acres (355 ha), and a total volume of 9,663 acre-feet (11,919,000 m^{3}). It has about 18 miles (29 km) of shoreline.

Anglers can expect to catch a variety of fish including Channel Catfish, Largemouth Bass and Walleye. Facilities around Lake Frederick include boat ramps, boat dock, fishing dock, RV and tent campsites, picnic areas, outdoor grills, showers, restrooms, playground, pavilion, volleyball court, and hiking/biking/ATV trails.

== Deep Red Creek ==
The Lake Frederick watershed is located in the northern portion of Tillman County and is approximately 35,907 acres (14,531 ha). The primary tributary and major outflow from the lake is Deep Red Creek. That stream originates just east inside the Comanche County, Oklahoma line south of State Highway 49 and east of State Highway 54, before traveling generally southwest into Kiowa County and eventually Tillman County, joining Lake Frederick from the north. Below the lake, the creek travels generally south-southeast before terminating east-southeast of Manitou, Oklahoma, without being a tributary of another creek or river.

== Paleontology ==
The shoreline of Lake Frederick has produced a diverse fauna of Early Permian vertebrates. The presence of taxa like Dimetrodon limbatus and Ophiacodon retroversus suggest an Artinskian age for the locality. The Lake Frederick locality belongs to the Garber Sandstone and the age has been dated to 281 million years ago.

=== Chondrichthyes ===
Cartilaginous fish of The Lake Frederick Locality
Genus	Species	Notes
Orthacanthus	O.sp.	A large xenacanthid.
Barbclabornia	B.luederensis	A giant xenacanthid.
Dicentrodus	D.sp.	A small xenacanthid.

=== Sarcoptergyi ===
Lobe finned fishes of the Lake Frederick locality
Genus	Species	Notes
Sagenodus	S.porrectus	A lungfish.

=== Amphibia ===
Amphibians of the Lake Frederick Locality
Genus	Species	Notes
Diplocaulus	D.sp.	A lepospondyl.
Acheloma	A.sp.	A temnospondyl.
Archeria	A.sp.	An embolomere.
Eryops	E.megacephalus	A temnospondyl.
Trimerorhachis	T.insignis	A dvinosaur.

=== Reptiliomorpha ===
Reptiliomorphs of the Lake Frederick locality
Genus	Species	Notes
Captorhinus	C.aguti	A captorhinid.
Diadectes	D.sp.	A diadectid.

=== Synapsida ===
Synapsids of the Lake Frederick Locality
Genus	Species	Notes
Dimetrodon	D.limbatus	A sphenacodont.
Edaphosaurus	E.boanerges	An edaphosaurid.
Ophiacodon	O.retroversus	An ophiacodontid.
