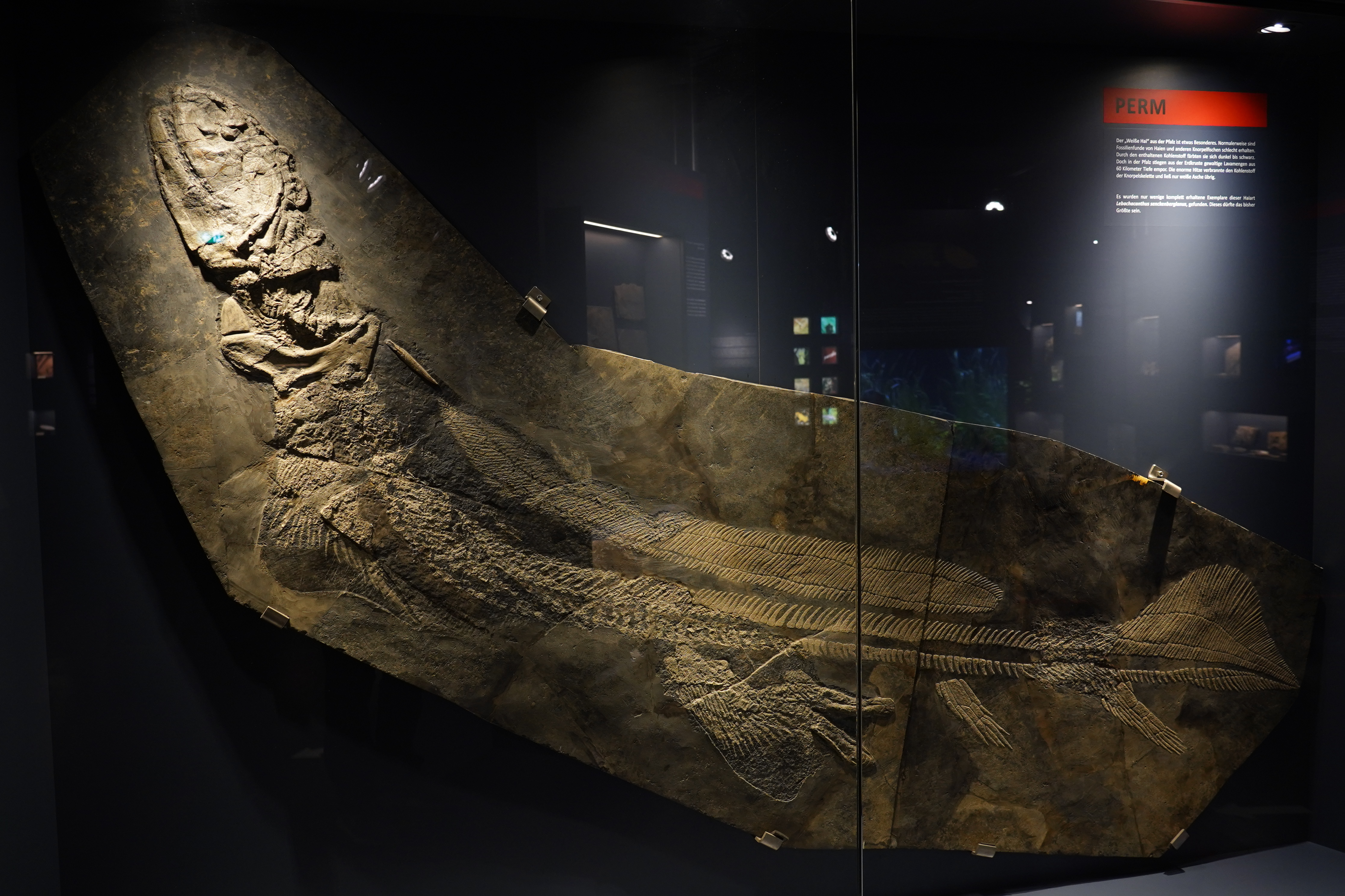
- Specimen in Urzeitmeer-Museum

Scientific classification
- Kingdom: Animalia
- Phylum: Chordata
- Class: Chondrichthyes
- Subclass: Elasmobranchii
- Order: †Xenacanthiformes
- Family: †Diplodoselachidae; Soler-Gijon, 1997
- Genus: †Lebachacanthus; Soler-Gijon, 1997

Type species
- Lebachacanthus senckenbergianus (Fritsch, 1889)

Other species
- L. colloseus Heidtke, 2007; L. pollichiae Heidtke, 2007; L. ventricosus (Fritsch, 1889)

Synonyms
- Orthacanthus senckenbergianus Fritsch, 1889

= Lebachacanthus =

Lebachacanthus Temporal range: Kasimovian–Asselian

Extinct genus of cartilaginous fishes

Lebachacanthus is a genus of extinct xenacanth cartilaginous fish known from the late Carboniferous-Early Permian of Europe. Well-preserved specimens, originally identified as Orthacanthus, are known from Meisenheim Formation in Germany. During the late Paleozoic, xenacanths were the apex predators of freshwater ecosystems, preying on small amphibians.

== Description ==
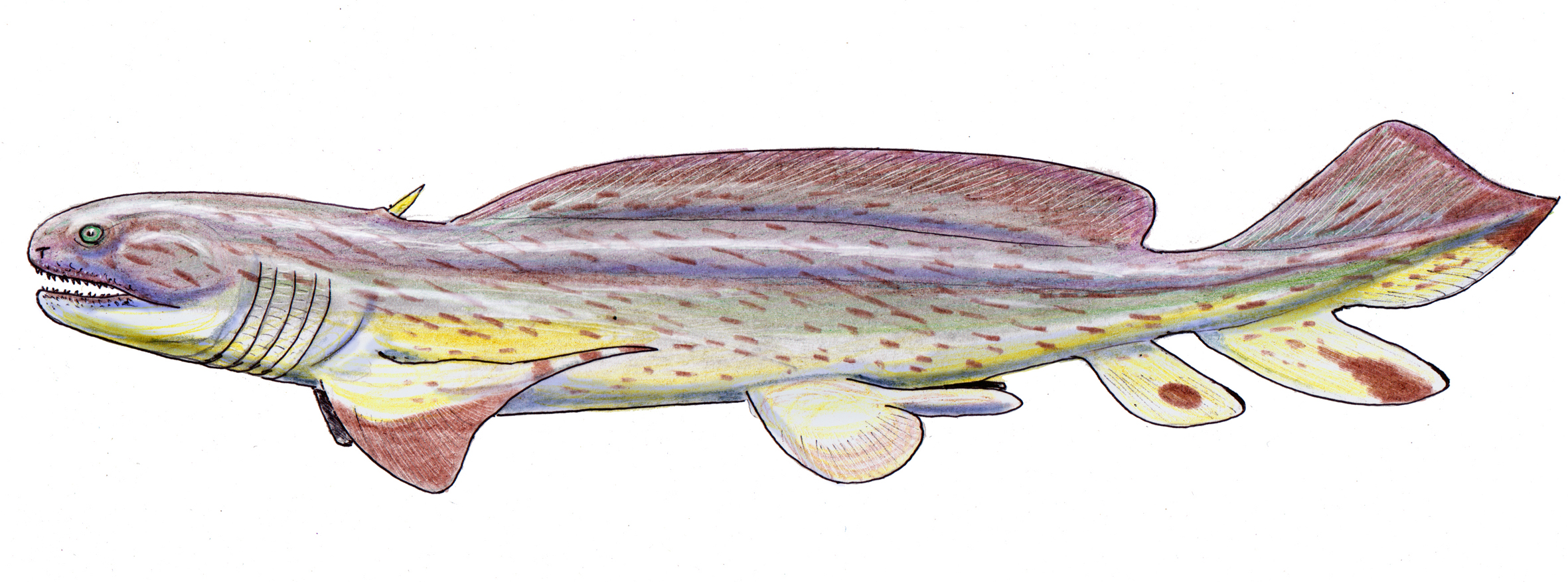
Life restoration

Like most other xenacanthids, this genus possessed an array of spines arising from the dorsal fins. It exceeded 3 metres (9.8 ft) and even could reach 3.5 metres (11 ft). The genus is often confused with the similar genus Orthacanthus; the two genera belong to entirely separate families. The teeth of this fish were multi-cusped, with the central cusp flanked by two sharp accessory "tines" on which its prey would be impaled and trapped, in preparation for being swallowed whole. It had an abundance of pectoral fins, two next to the head, two in the middle, one near the end, and one under the caudal fin.

== Paleobiology ==
Lebachacanthus patrolled both fresh and marine waters, possibly preying on larvae of the temnospondyli and acanthodians. The genus displays sexually dimorphic features; females had longer fin spines than males. Histological and biometric analyses of the spines of specimens provides information on the development and age at death of the fish and the environmental conditions in which they lived.
