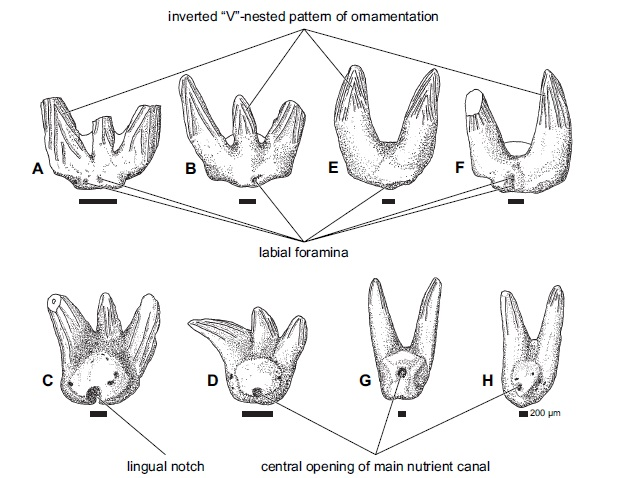

Scientific classification
- Kingdom: Animalia
- Phylum: Chordata
- Class: Chondrichthyes
- Subclass: Elasmobranchii
- Infraclass: †Xenacanthimorpha
- Order: †Bransonelliformes
- Genus: †Bransonella; Harlton, 1933

Species
- †Bransonella lingulata Ivanov and Ginter 1996; †Bransonella nebraskensis Johnson 1984; †Bransonella tribula Elliott and Hodnett 2013; †Bransonella tridentata Harlton 1933

= Bransonella =

Bransonella Temporal range: Famennian–Wordian

Extinct cartilaginous fish

Bransonella is an extinct genus of marine xenacanth which lived during the Paleozoic era. It is known only from teeth which are easily distinguished from related genera by ornamentation on the cusp shaped like an inverted "V" and fin spines Teeth attributed to this genus are small, no greater than 2 millimeters. This suggests a small body size likely not exceeding a meter in length. It has been suggested their lifestyle was similar to modern catsharks, eating trilobites, crustaceans, gastropods and occasionally small fish. It was used to erect a new order along with Barbclabornia based on ornamentation.

There are four species currently attributed to this genus. The first species described was B. tridentata in 1933, which was erroneously identified as a conodont. B. nebraskensis was described from the late Pennsylvanian of Nebraska and later recognized from the middle Mississippian to the early Permian of Kansas, the Urals, Poland, Belgium, Russia, and England. B. lingulata is known from Serpukhovian of Russia. B. tribula was described out of the middle Permian Kaibab formation of Arizona. Additional reports of this genus come from the Mississippian of China and Australia as well as the Pennsylvanian of Hungary and Brazil.
