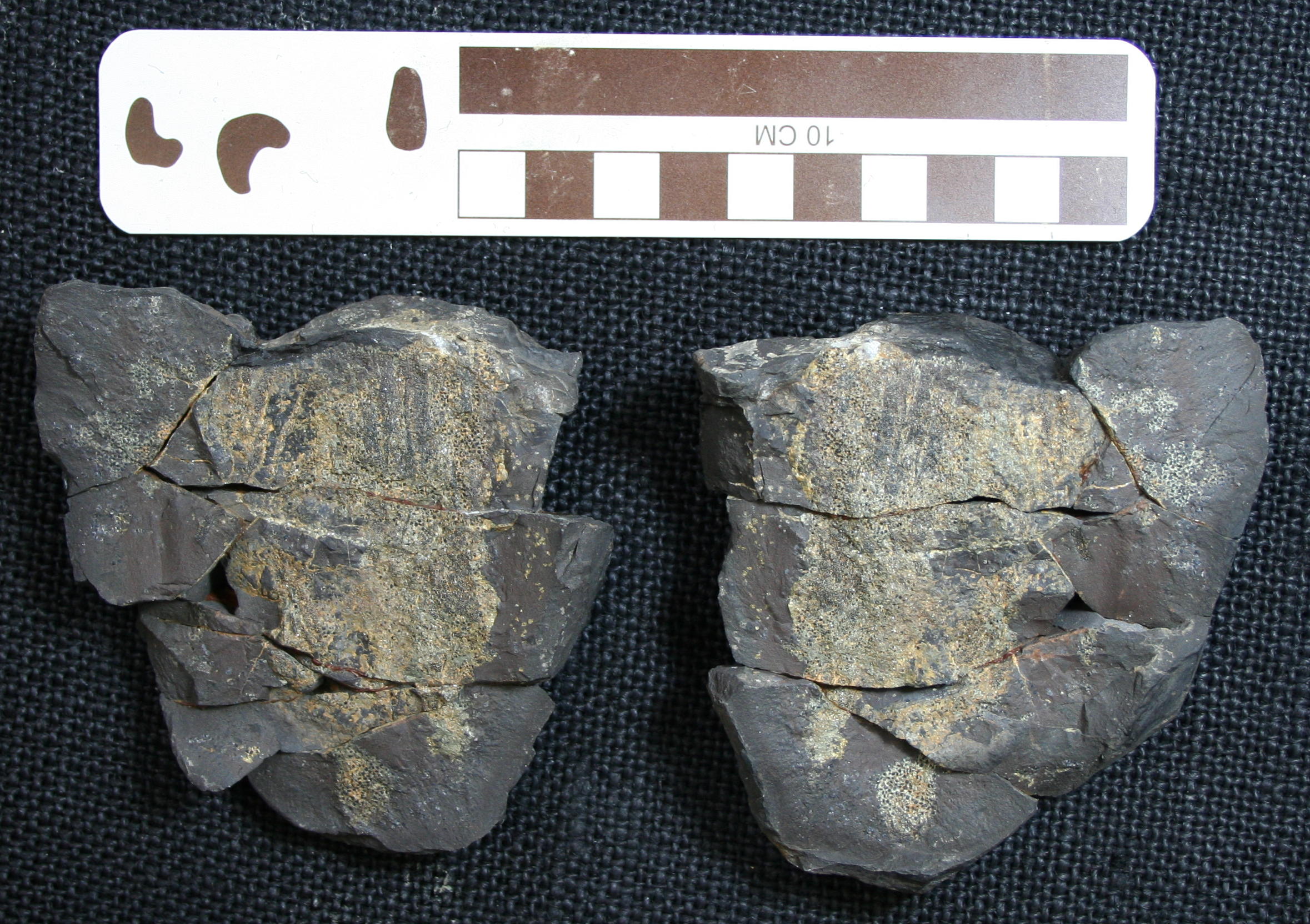
- Neurocranium of D. woodi, preserved as a part and counterpart

Scientific classification
- Kingdom: Animalia
- Phylum: Chordata
- Class: Chondrichthyes
- Subclass: Elasmobranchii
- Order: †Xenacanthiformes
- Family: †Diplodoselachidae
- Genus: †Diplodoselache; Dick, 1981

Type species
- Diplodoselache woodi Dick, 1981

Other species
- D. parvulus Traquair, 1881; ?"D." antiqua Lebedev, 1996

Synonyms
- Diplodus minutus Agassiz, 1843; Diploselache woodi Turner, 1993

= Diplodoselache =

Diplodoselache Temporal range: Carboniferous Visean

Extinct genus of cartilaginous fish

Diplodoselache is an extinct genus of cartilaginous fish from the Carboniferous of Scotland and possibly Russia.

== Discovery and naming ==
Diplodoselache was described by John Dick in 1981 based on four complete skeletons preserved in Viséan-stage ironstone concretions. The type species, D. woodi, is named in honor of Scottish fossil collector Stan Wood, who discovered the first complete fossils of the species in the Midland Valley region of Scotland. Now-lost teeth similar to those of Diplodoselache were first described from the same region by naturalist Louis Agassiz in the 1840s and were assigned to the genus Diplodus. Similar, also now-lost teeth were later described by Ramsay Traquair in the 1880s and assigned to the species Diplodus parvulus, and these may also have belonged to Diplodoselache. The possible species Diplodoselache antiqua is known from the Tula Oblast of Russia.

== Description ==
The teeth of Diplodoselache had two large outer cusps and one very small inner cusp. The animal had an elongated body, a forked, heterocercal tail fin, and a covering of dermal denticles. It had a single dorsal fin, which supported a fin spine that was similar to those on the back of the head in other xenacanthiform fishes. The largest complete specimen is 1.12 meters in length, but in Dick's description of the taxon he suggests some individuals were "considerably greater than one metre" in length.

== Evolution and classification ==
The genus is intermediate between more basal chondrichthyans and later members of the order Xenacanthiformes. Features such as the teeth and dorsal spine are similar to other xenacanths, while the shape of the fins is more like earlier groups of chondrichthyan such as the Ctenacanthiformes. The genus is placed in the xenacanth family Diplodoselachidae.

== Paleoecology ==
Diplodoselache was a predator which inhabited a lagoonal environment. This environment was home to a diverse array of other cartilaginous and bony fishes, as well as amphibians.
