= Manitou, Oklahoma =

- Town
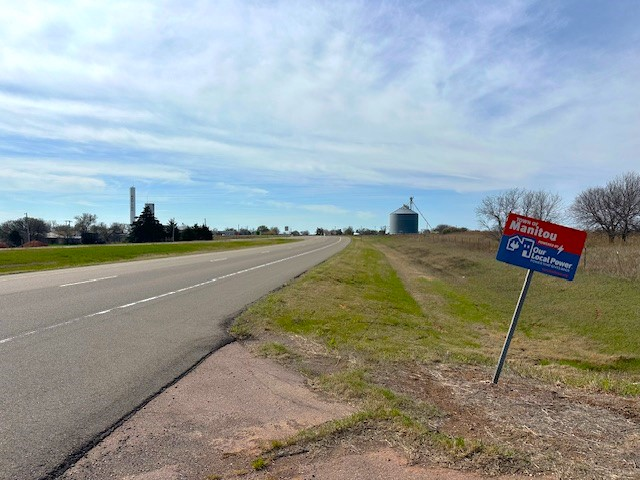
- Welcome sign on highway into Manitou, 3-2025; grain elevator in background

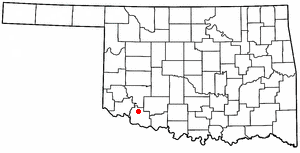
- Location of Manitou, Oklahoma
- Coordinates: 34°30′26″N 98°58′52″W
- Country: United States
- State: Oklahoma
- County: Tillman

Area
  - Total: 0.31 sq mi (0.81 km^{2})
  - Land: 0.31 sq mi (0.81 km^{2})
  - Water: 0 sq mi (0.00 km^{2})
- Elevation: 1,250 ft (380 m)

Population (2020)
  - Total: 171
  - Density: 544/sq mi (210.1/km^{2})
- Time zone: UTC-6 (Central (CST))
  - Summer (DST): UTC-5 (CDT)
- ZIP code: 73555
- Area code: 580
- FIPS code: 40-46150
- GNIS feature ID: 2412943

Manitou is a town in Tillman County, Oklahoma, United States. It is located about 40 miles west-southwest of Lawton. The population was 171 as of the 2020 United States census. The site includes the former town of Siboney, absorbed on January 28, 1907.

== Geography ==
According to the United States Census Bureau, the town has a total area of 0.3 square miles (0.78 km^{2}), all land.

Lake Frederick is approximately seven miles east.

== Demographics ==
Historical population
| Census | Pop. | Note | %± |
|---|---|---|---|
| 1910 | 267 | | — |
| 1920 | 335 | | 25.5% |
| 1930 | 323 | | −3.6% |
| 1940 | 258 | | −20.1% |
| 1950 | 293 | | 13.6% |
| 1960 | 269 | | −8.2% |
| 1970 | 308 | | 14.5% |
| 1980 | 322 | | 4.5% |
| 1990 | 244 | | −24.2% |
| 2000 | 278 | | 13.9% |
| 2010 | 181 | | −34.9% |
| 2020 | 171 | | −5.5% |
U.S. Decennial Census

=== 2020 census ===
As of the 2020 census, Manitou had a population of 171. The median age was 33.8 years. 32.7% of residents were under the age of 18 and 21.6% of residents were 65 years of age or older. For every 100 females there were 167.2 males, and for every 100 females age 18 and over there were 125.5 males age 18 and over.

0.0% of residents lived in urban areas, while 100.0% lived in rural areas.

There were 64 households in Manitou, of which 28.1% had children under the age of 18 living in them. Of all households, 37.5% were married-couple households, 23.4% were households with a male householder and no spouse or partner present, and 31.3% were households with a female householder and no spouse or partner present. About 26.6% of all households were made up of individuals and 15.6% had someone living alone who was 65 years of age or older.

There were 79 housing units, of which 19.0% were vacant. The homeowner vacancy rate was 0.0% and the rental vacancy rate was 7.7%.

Racial composition as of the 2020 census
| Race | Number | Percent |
|---|---|---|
| White | 119 | 69.6% |
| Black or African American | 18 | 10.5% |
| American Indian and Alaska Native | 8 | 4.7% |
| Asian | 0 | 0.0% |
| Native Hawaiian and Other Pacific Islander | 0 | 0.0% |
| Some other race | 11 | 6.4% |
| Two or more races | 15 | 8.8% |
| Hispanic or Latino (of any race) | 24 | 14.0% |

=== 2000 census ===
The median income for a household in the town was $33,036, and the median income for a family was $35,750. Males had a median income of $23,750 versus $12,321 for females. The per capita income for the town was $9,177. About 13.8% of families and 25.9% of the population were below the poverty line, including 47.8% of those under the age of eighteen and 16.0% of those 65 or over.

== Transportation ==
Manitou is served by U.S. Route 183, and is the eastern terminus of State Highway 5C.

Frederick Regional Airport (KFDR; FAA ID: FDR), with a 6099 x 150 ft. paved runway, is approximately 11 miles south of town.

Commercial air transportation is available out of Lawton-Fort Sill Regional Airport, about 38 miles to the east, or the larger Will Rogers World Airport in Oklahoma City, about 121 miles northeast.

== Government and infrastructure ==
The Southwest Oklahoma Juvenile Center of the Oklahoma Office of Juvenile Affairs is located in Manitou.
