= Fayolia =

Fayolia Temporal range: Late Devonian–Middle Triassic

Scientific classification
- Domain: Eukaryota
- Kingdom: Animalia
- Phylum: Chordata
- Class: Chondrichthyes
- Subclass: Elasmobranchii
- Order: †Xenacanthida
- Family: †Xenacanthidae
- Genus: †Fayolia; Renault & Zeiller, 1884

Type species
- †Fayolia dentata Renault & Zeiller, 1884

Species
- †Fayolia dentata Renault & Zeiller, 1884; †Fayolia sharovi Fischer et al., 2011; †Fayolia sterzeliana Weiss, 1887

Extinct family of sharks

Fayolia is a genus of fossil egg capsule, widely thought to have been produced by xenacanths. The egg is elongate and tapers towards both ends, and surrounded by helically twisted collarettes, with one end (the beak) having a tendril.

It is predominantly known from freshwater deposits with 16 species spanning a stratigraphic range from the Late Devonian to the Middle Triassic. A new species, Fayolia sharovi, was described in 2011 from lacustrine deposits of the Middle Triassic Madygen Formation in Kyrgyzstan, Central Asia.
