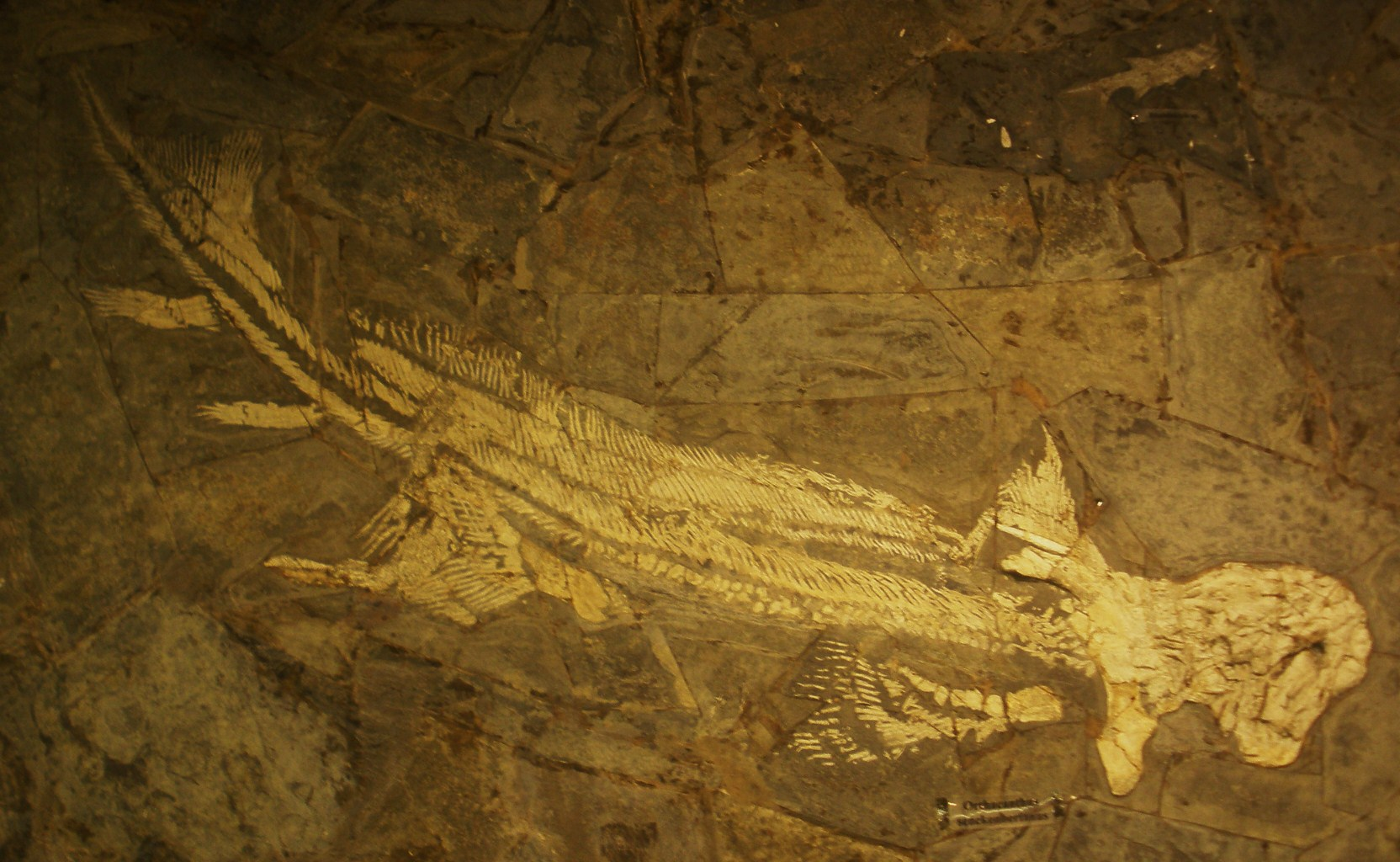
- Fossil of Lebachacanthus senckenbergianus

Scientific classification
- Kingdom: Animalia
- Phylum: Chordata
- Class: Chondrichthyes
- Subclass: Elasmobranchii
- Order: †Xenacanthiformes; Berg, 1937

Families and genera
- See text

= Xenacanthiformes =

Xenacanthiformes Temporal range: Mississippian–Norian
- Life restoration of Xenacanthus

Extinct order of cartilaginous fishes

Xenacanthiformes (or Xenacanthida) is an order or superorder of extinct shark-like chondrichthyans (cartilaginous fish) known from the Carboniferous to the Late Triassic. They were native to freshwater, marginal marine, and shallow marine habitats. Some xenacanths may have grown to lengths of 5 m (16 ft). Most xenacanths died out at the end of the Permian in the End-Permian Mass Extinction, with only a few forms surviving into the Triassic.

== Description ==
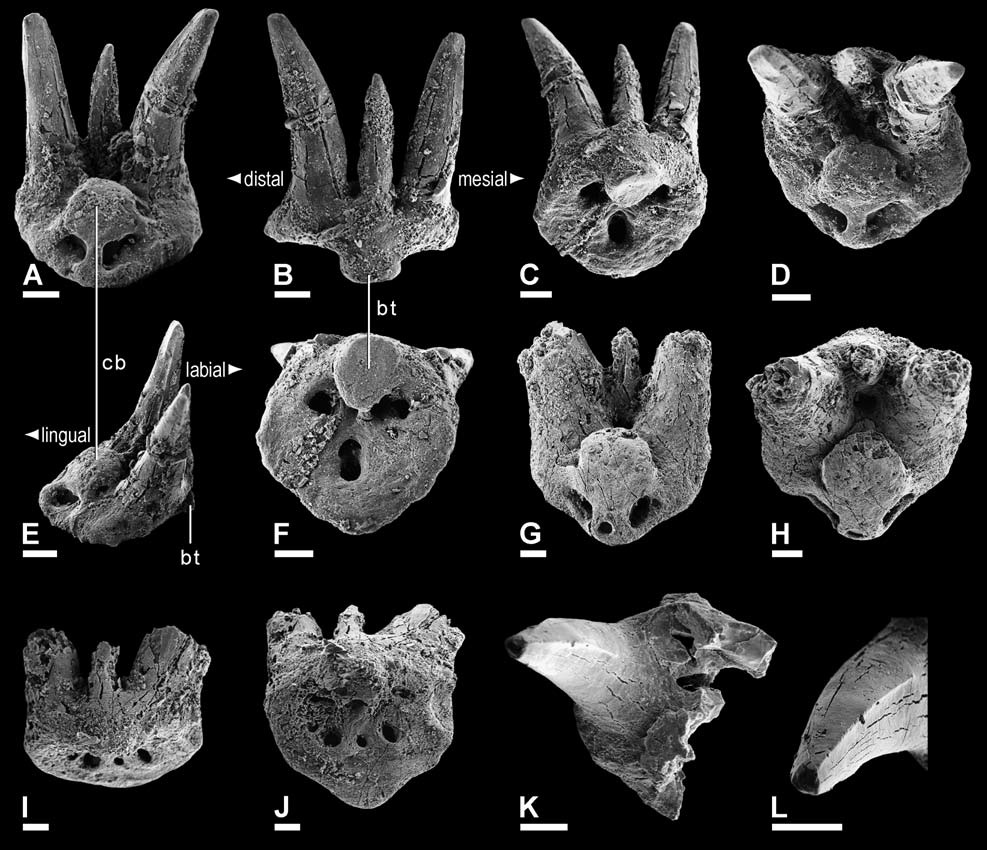
Teeth of Triodus teberdaensis

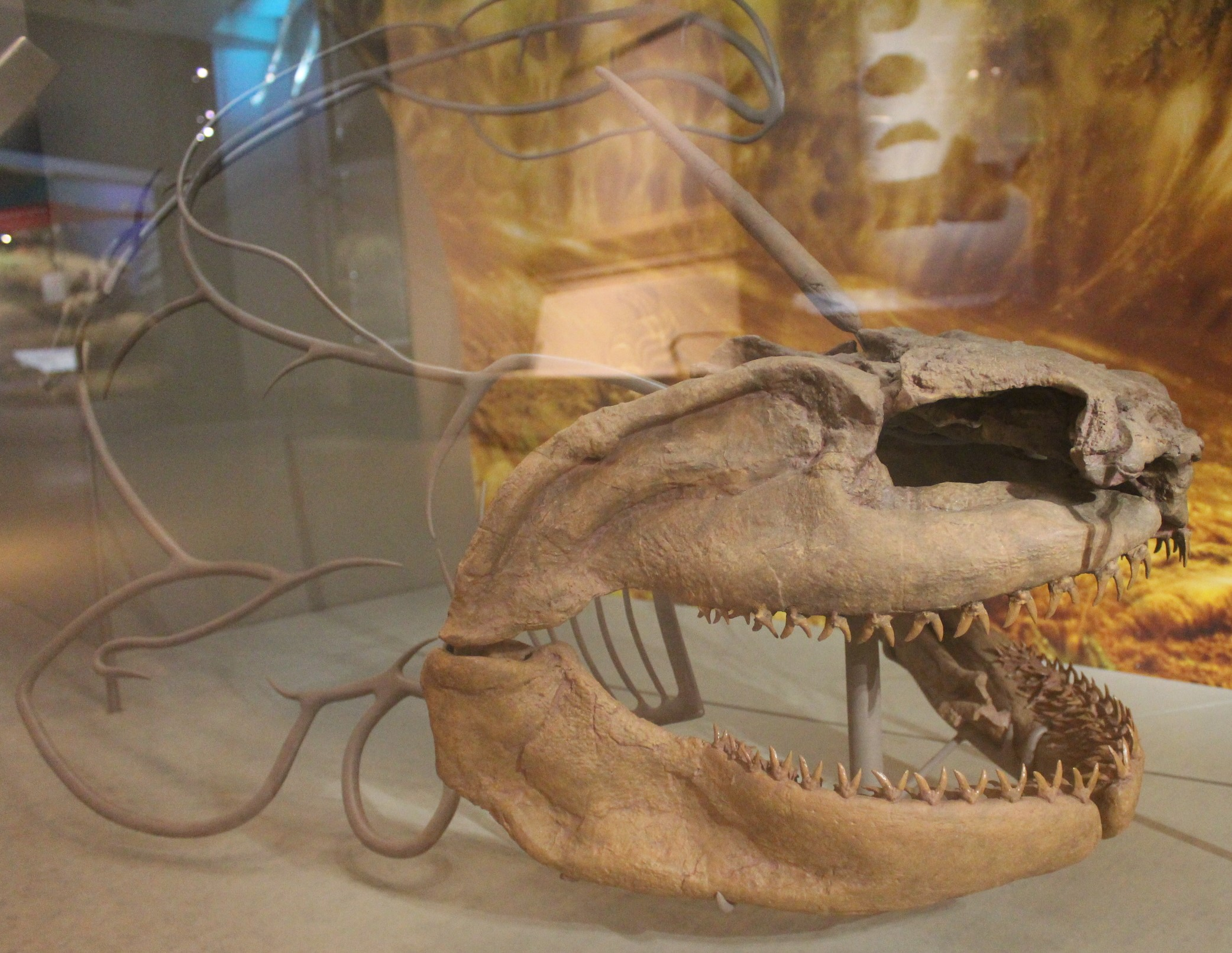
Skull of Orthacanthus

The foundation of the tooth is prolonged lingually with a circlet button and a basal tubercle on the oral and aboral surfaces individually. The family Xenacanthidae consists of five genera: Xenacanthus, Triodus, Plicatodus, Mooreodontus and Wurdigneria; all of these are distinguished by cross sections of the points, crown center, length of the median edge, type of vertical cristae, and microscopic anatomy.

Xenacanths are divided into two groups based on dental characteristics. Group one has tricuspid crowns containing two stout, slightly diverging lateral cusps pointing in the same direction, a high median cusp, with a crown-base angle almost at 90 degrees, a large, rounded, apical button with several foramina and multiple, 8-9 coarse vertical cristae on all the cusps. Group two has bicuspid crowns with two upright, asymmetric cusps, where the medial cusp is thicker than the distal one, and consistently lacks a median cusp.

The bodies of xenacanths are elongate and eel-like. Xenacanths had long dorsal fins, as well as a large spine projecting from the top of the head, which was a modified dorsal-fin spine. The spine is usually thought to have acted as a defense against attackers. They also bore two anal fins, with the tail (caudal) fin being pseudo-diphycercal. They were probably slow swimmers that swam using side to side undulations of the body (anguilliform locomotion).

Some xenacanths like Barbclabornia, are thought to have reached lengths of 4.5–5 metres (15–16 ft). While others such as Triodus were only around 0.5 metres (1.6 ft) long.

== Ecology ==
Many xenacanths are thought to have been euryhaline and to have migrated between freshwater and marine environments. Orthacanthus platypternus from the Early Permian of North America is suggested to have been catadromous, migrating into freshwater environments as a juvenile before returning to the sea as an adult. Based on isotope analysis of teeth, some xenacanths have been suggested to have lived permanently in freshwater environments. However, this proposal has been criticised by some authors, as the mineralization window of individual teeth only spans a short interval of time of days to weeks, and may not be reflective of long term behaviour. However isotopic analysis of fin spines of Orthacanthus and Triodus from the Early Permian of France, suggests that at least for these species, growth exclusively occurred in freshwater environments.

Fossil egg cases assigned to the genus Fayolia, which were probably produced by xenacanths, have a helically twisted collarette running around them, similar to the eggs of bullhead sharks, and taper towards both ends, with one end having a tendril. These eggs are typically found in freshwater deposits.

A number of xenacanths are likely to have been fully marine, such as the small primitive genus Bransonella, which is thought to have had a seafloor dwelling (benthic) ecology similar to that of a modern catshark.

Most xenacanths are thought to have been ambush predators. The diet of freshwater xenacanths is known to have included temnospondyl amphibians as well as palaeoniscid fish, acanthodians, and other xenacanths. Large xenacanths are suggested to have acted as the apex predators of late Paleozoic freshwater ecosystems, such as the Early Permian freshwater lakes of the Saar–Nahe Basin in southern Germany. The large Barbclabornia, which has proportionally tiny teeth, has been suggested to be a filter feeder by some authors, different from the lifestyle inferred for other xenacanths.

== Taxonomy ==
Xenacanths are typically placed as stem-group elasmobranchs, more closely related to modern sharks and rays than to Holocephali, which includes chimaeras. A number of recent phylogenetic studies have found xenacanths to be nested within the traditional "Ctenacanthiformes", which would render that group paraphyletic.

Cladogram after Luccisano et al. 2021:

- Chondrichthyes
  - Holocephali (chimaeras and relatives)
  - Total group Elasmobranchii
    - - †Phoebodontiformes
      - - †Cladodoides (usually considered a "ctenacanth")
        - - †Tamiobatis (usually considered a "ctenacanth")
          - †Xenacanthiformes
    - Euselachii
      - †Hybodontiformes
      - Neoselachii
        - Selachii (modern sharks)
        - Batomorphi (rays, etc)

=== Subdivisions ===
- Order: Bransonelliformes Hampe & Ivanov, 2007
    - Genus: Barbclabornia Johnson, 2003 (Early Permian, possibly also Late Carboniferous, North America)
    - Genus: Bransonella Harlton, 1933 (Early Carboniferous-Middle Permian, Worldwide)
- Order: Xenacanthiformes Berg, 1955
  - Family: Diplodoselachidae Dick, 1981
    - Genus: Dicentrodus Traquair, 1888 (Early Carboniferous, Europe, North America)
    - Genus: Diplodoselache Dick, 1981 (Early Carboniferous, Europe)
    - Genus: Hagenoselache Hampe & Heidkte, 1997 (mid-Carboniferous, Europe)
    - Genus: Hokomata Hodnett & Elliott, 2018 (mid-Carboniferous, North America)
    - Genus: Lebachacanthus Soler-Gijon, 1997 (Late Carboniferous-Early Permian, Europe)
    - Genus: Reginaselache Turner & Burrow, 2011 (Early Carboniferous, Australia)
  - Family: Sphenacanthidae Maisey, 1982
    - Genus: Sphenacanthus Agassiz, 1837 (Early Carboniferous-Late Permian, Worldwide)
    - Genus: Xenosynechodus Agassiz, 1980 (Middle-Late Permian, Europe, later authors have rejected its placement as a xenacanth)
    - Genus: Desinia Ivanov, 2022 (Middle-Late Permian, Europe)
  - Family: Orthacanthidae Heyler & Poplin 1990
    - Genus: Orthacanthus Agassiz, 1843 (Late Carboniferous-Early Permian, Europe, North America)
  - Family: Xenacanthidae Fritsch, 1889
    - Genus: Mooreodontus Ginter et al., 2010 (Middle-Late Triassic, Worldwide)
    - Genus: Plicatodus Hampe, 1995 (Late Carboniferous-Early Permian, Europe)
    - Genus: Triodus Jordan, 1849 (Late Carboniferous-Middle Permian, Europe, North America, South America)
    - Genus: Xenacanthus Beyrich, 1848 (Carboniferous-Permian, Worldwide)
    - Genus: Wurdigneria Richter, 2005 (Middle-Late Permian, South America)
  - incertae sedis
    - Genus: Tikiodontus Bhat, Ray & Datta, 2018 (Late Triassic, India)
