= Albany Group =

- Stratigraphic range: Permian
- Type: Group
- Sub-units: Lueders Formation

Location
- Region: Texas
- Country: United States

The Albany Group is a geologic group in Texas. It preserves fossils dating back to the Permian period.

== See also ==
- List of fossiliferous stratigraphic units in Texas
- Paleontology in Texas
