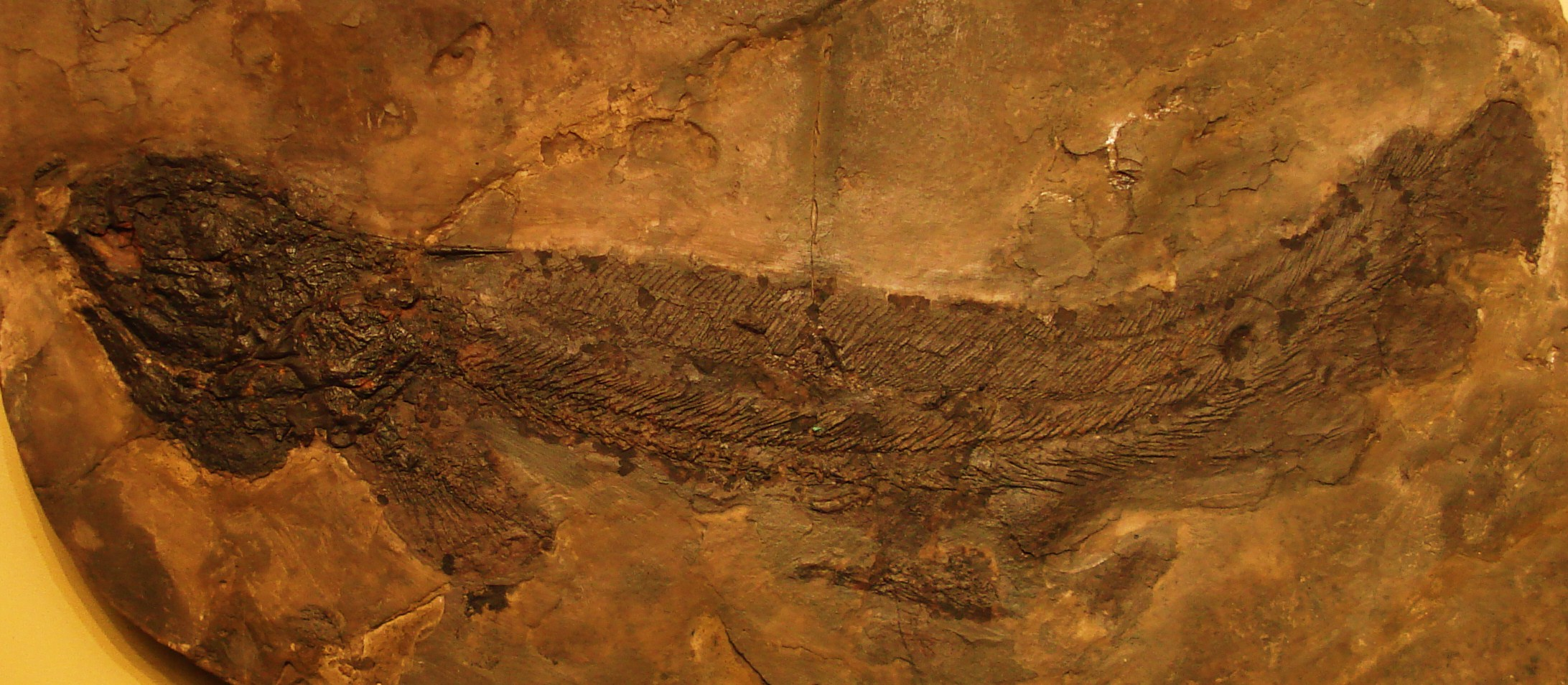
- Fossil

Scientific classification
- Kingdom: Animalia
- Phylum: Chordata
- Class: Chondrichthyes
- Subclass: Elasmobranchii
- Order: †Xenacanthiformes
- Family: †Xenacanthidae
- Genus: †Triodus; Jordan, 1849

Species
- T. elpia; T. richterae

= Triodus =

Triodus Temporal range: Late Carboniferous–Middle Permian

Extinct genus of cartilaginous fishes

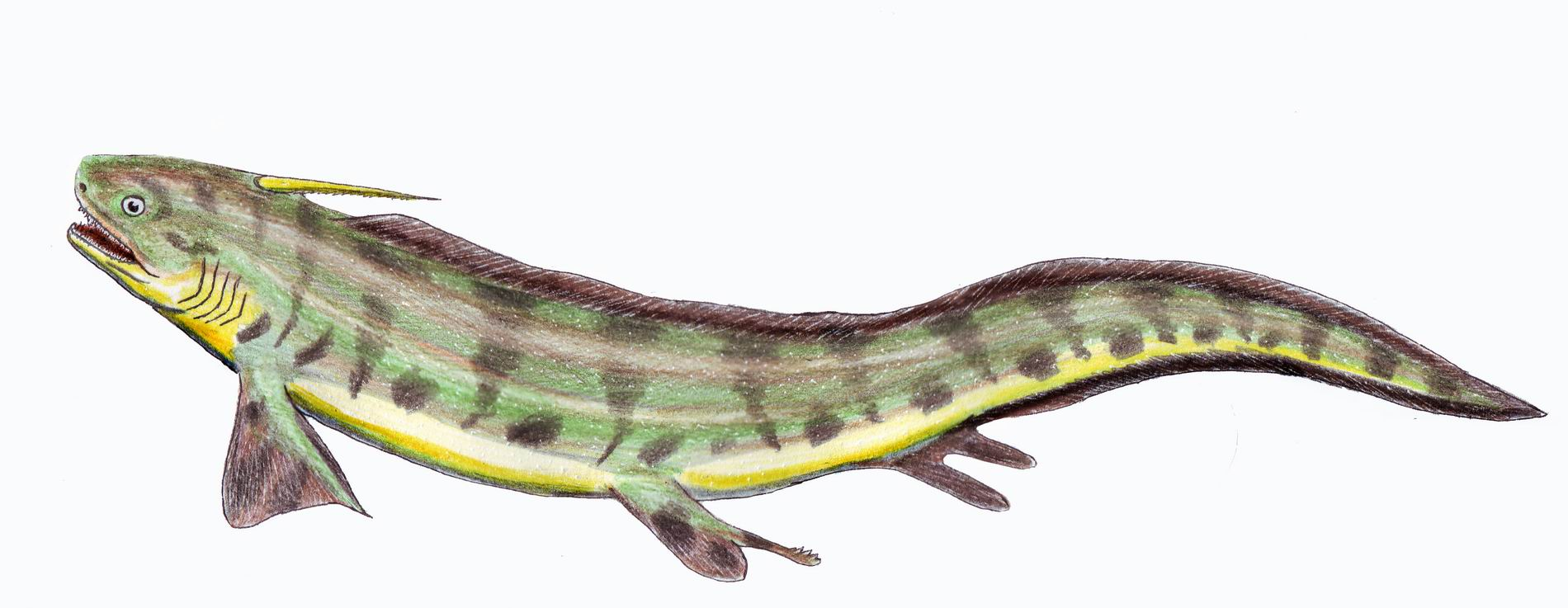
Restoration of T. sesselensis

Triodus is an extinct genus of xenacanthiform cartilaginous fish that lived from the Carboniferous to the Permian. In 2017, a new species Triodus richterae was described from the Rio do Rasto Formation of Brazil.
