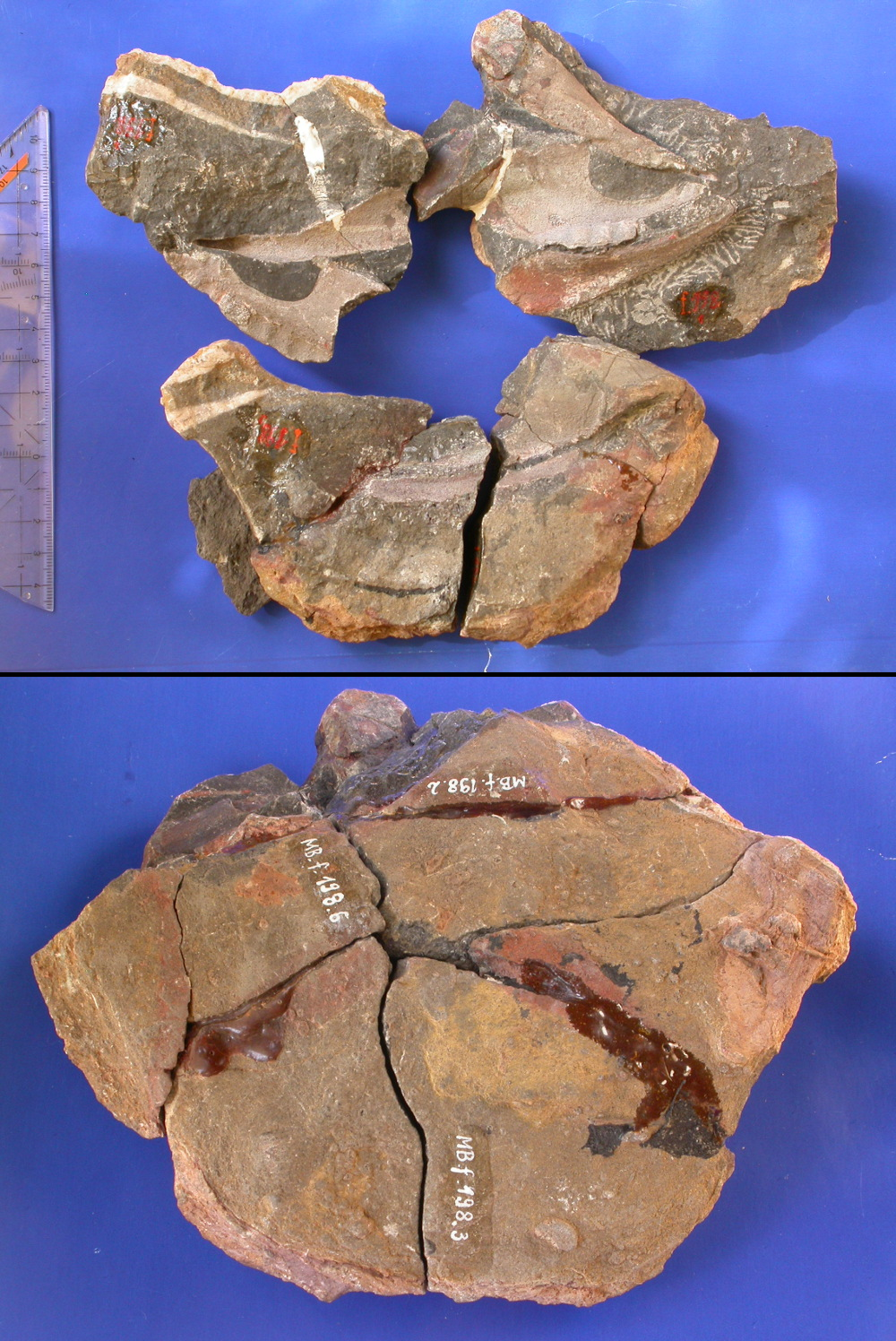
- Fossil

Scientific classification
- Domain: Eukaryota
- Kingdom: Animalia
- Phylum: Chordata
- Class: Chondrichthyes
- Subclass: Elasmobranchii
- Order: †Ctenacanthiformes
- Family: †Ctenacanthidae
- Genus: †Cladodoides; Maisey, 2001
- Species: †C. wildungensis

Binomial name
- †Cladodoides wildungensis (Jaekel, 1921)

= Cladodoides =

Cladodoides Temporal range: Late Devonian

Extinct genus of cartilaginous fishes

Cladodoides is a genus of extinct cartilaginous fish. It appeared in the Frasnian age of the late Devonian and possibly existed in the Tournaisian age of the early Carboniferous.

It has a well-described braincase and brain cavity, and has greatly informed our understanding of the skull, brain, nerves, and jaws of early sharks. Cladodoides is likely a cladodont shark. Remains have been found in Germany.

Six pentacuspid teeth, possibly belonging to Cladodoides wildungensis, have been found in the Tournaisian Laurel Formation, Australia.
