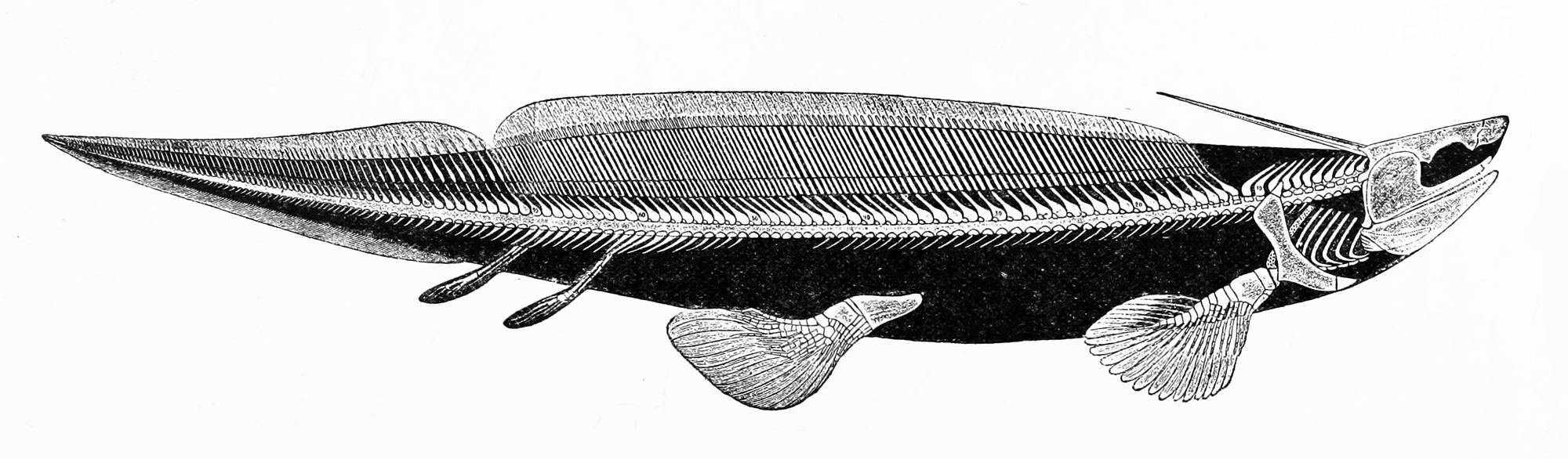
- Skeletal reconstruction of Xenacanthus decheni, drawn in 1909
- Life restoration of Xenacanthus

Scientific classification
- Kingdom: Animalia
- Phylum: Chordata
- Class: Chondrichthyes
- Subclass: Elasmobranchii
- Order: †Xenacanthiformes
- Family: †Xenacanthidae
- Genus: †Xenacanthus; Beyrich, 1848

Type species
- Xenacanthus decheni

Species
- See text

Synonyms
- Pleuracanthus Agassiz 1837

= Xenacanthus =

Xenacanthus Temporal range: Carboniferous–Permian

Extinct genus of cartilaginous fishes

Xenacanthus (from Ancient Greek ξένος, xénos, 'foreign, alien' + ἄκανθος, akanthos, 'spine') is an extinct genus of xenacanthid shark. It lived in freshwater environments, and fossils of various species have been found worldwide.

== Description ==
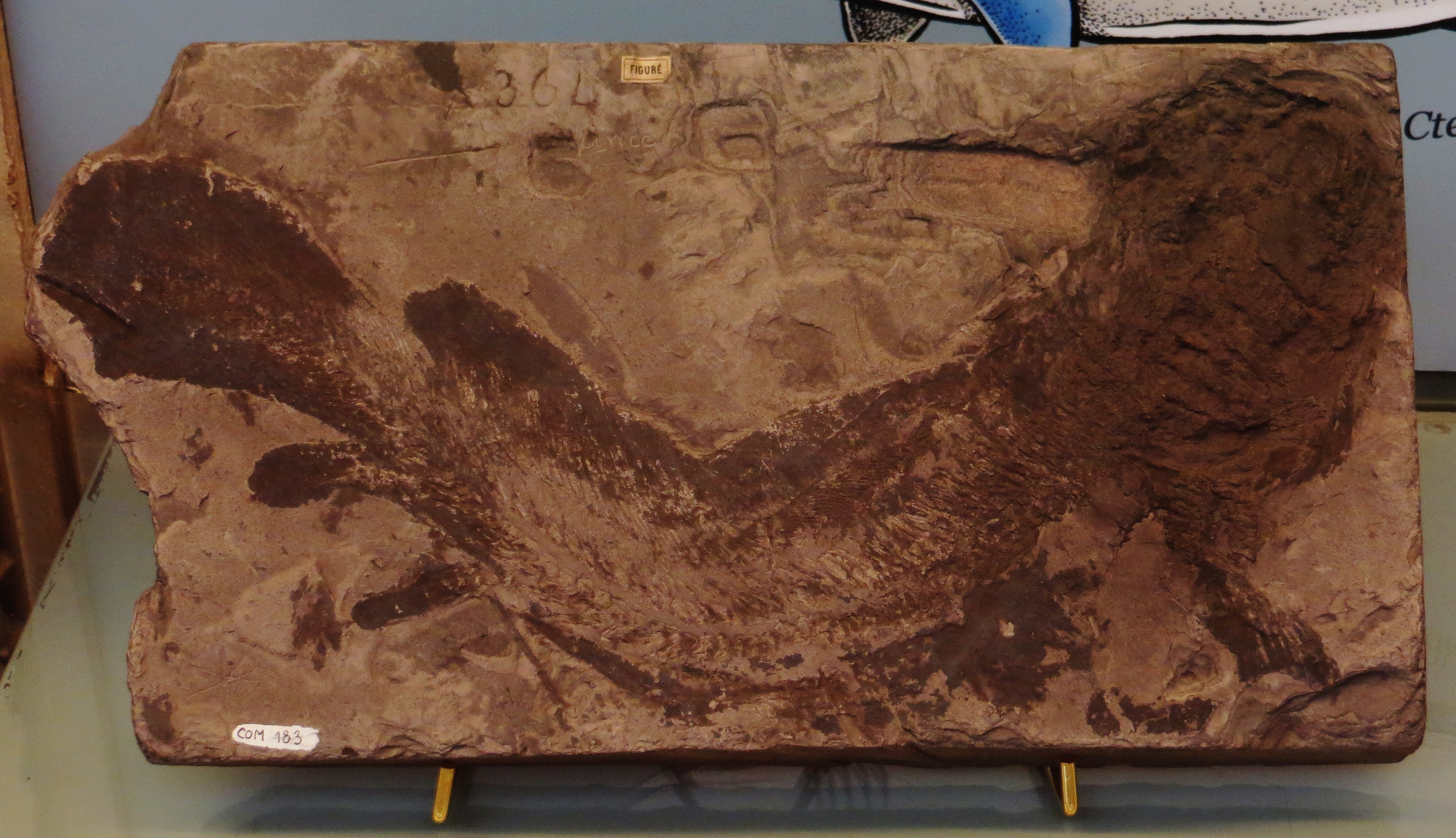
Fossil specimen of X. gaudryi

Xenacanthus is a relatively small member of its order. X. decheni reached about 1 m (3.3 ft), X. meisenheimensis reached up to 1.2 m (3.9 ft), X. (Expleuracanthus) gaudryi reached 58 cm (1.90 ft). X. parallelus is one of the smallest xenacanths, males reached 20 cm (0.66 ft) and females reached 34 cm (1.12 ft), both are fully grown.

The dorsal fin was ribbonlike and ran the entire length of the back and round the tail, where it joined with the anal fin. This arrangement resembles that of modern conger eels, and Xenacanthus probably swam in a similar manner. A distinctive spine projected from the back of the head and gave the genus its name. The spike has even been speculated to have been venomous, perhaps in a similar manner to a sting ray. The teeth had an unusual "V" shape, and it probably fed on small crustaceans and heavily scaled palaeoniscid fishes. As with many xencanths, Xenacanthus is mainly known because of fossilised teeth and spines.

Fossils are known from the Carboniferous-Permian of North America, Europe, and South America. Triassic species have been moved into the separate genus Mooreodontus.

== Species ==
- X. texensis
- X. atriossis
- X. compressus
- X. indicus
- X. decheni
- X. denticulatus
- X. erectus
- X. gibbosus
- X. gracilis
- X. howsei
- X. laevissimus
- X. latus
- X. luedernesis
- X. ossiani
- X. ovalis
- X. parallelus
- X. ragonhai - Rio do Rasto Formation, Brazil
- X. robustus
- X. serratus
- X. slaughteri
- X. taylori

== Palaeoecology ==
Paired δ^{18}O_{P} and ^{87}Sr/^{86}Sr measurements of the teeth of Xenacanthus indicate that it was a euryoecious genus, inhabiting rivers in addition to oligotrophic and to eutrophic lakes.
