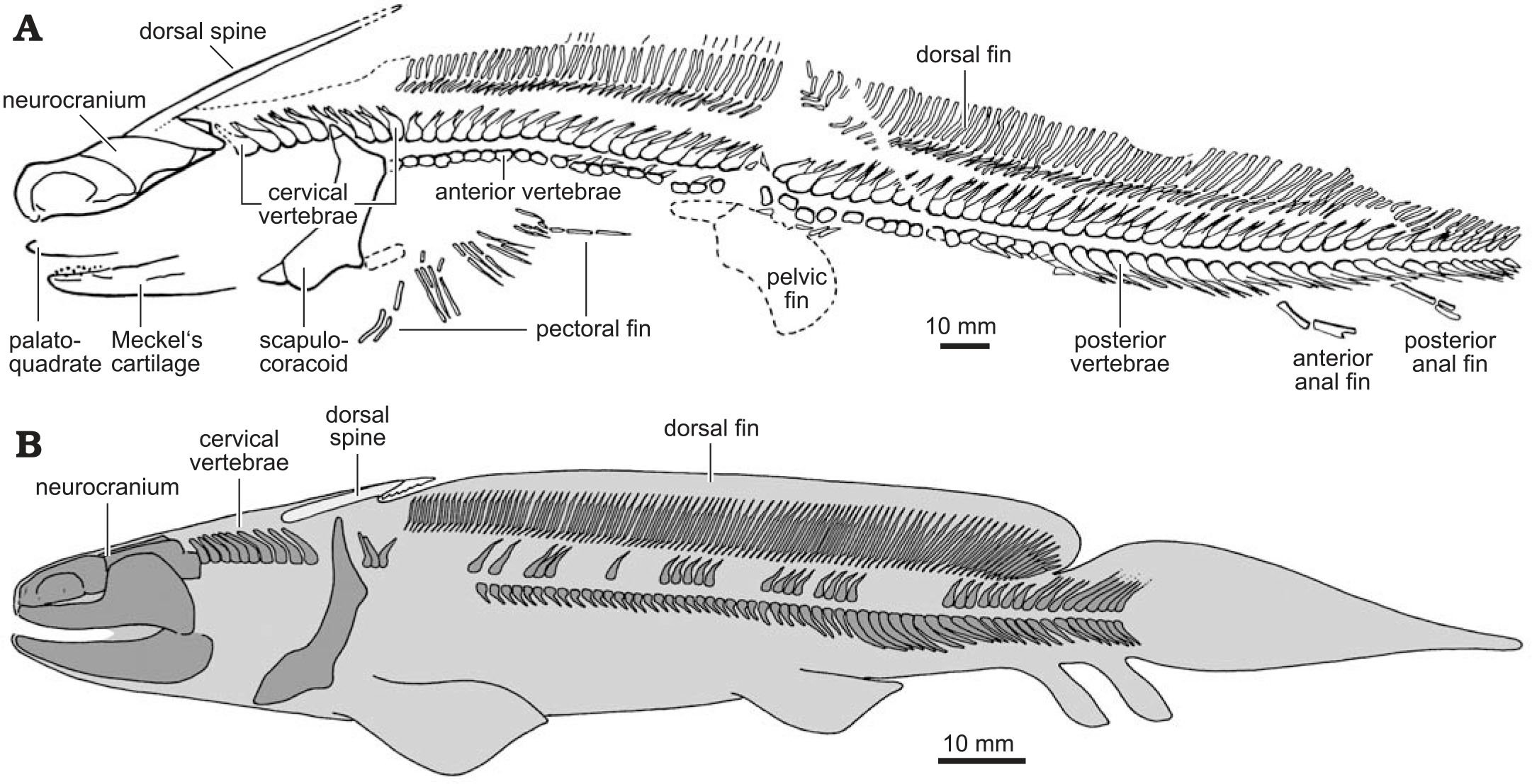
- Fossil interpretation of juvenile specimen of O. platypternus (top) and skeletal reconstruction of juvenile specimen of O. bohemicus (bottom)
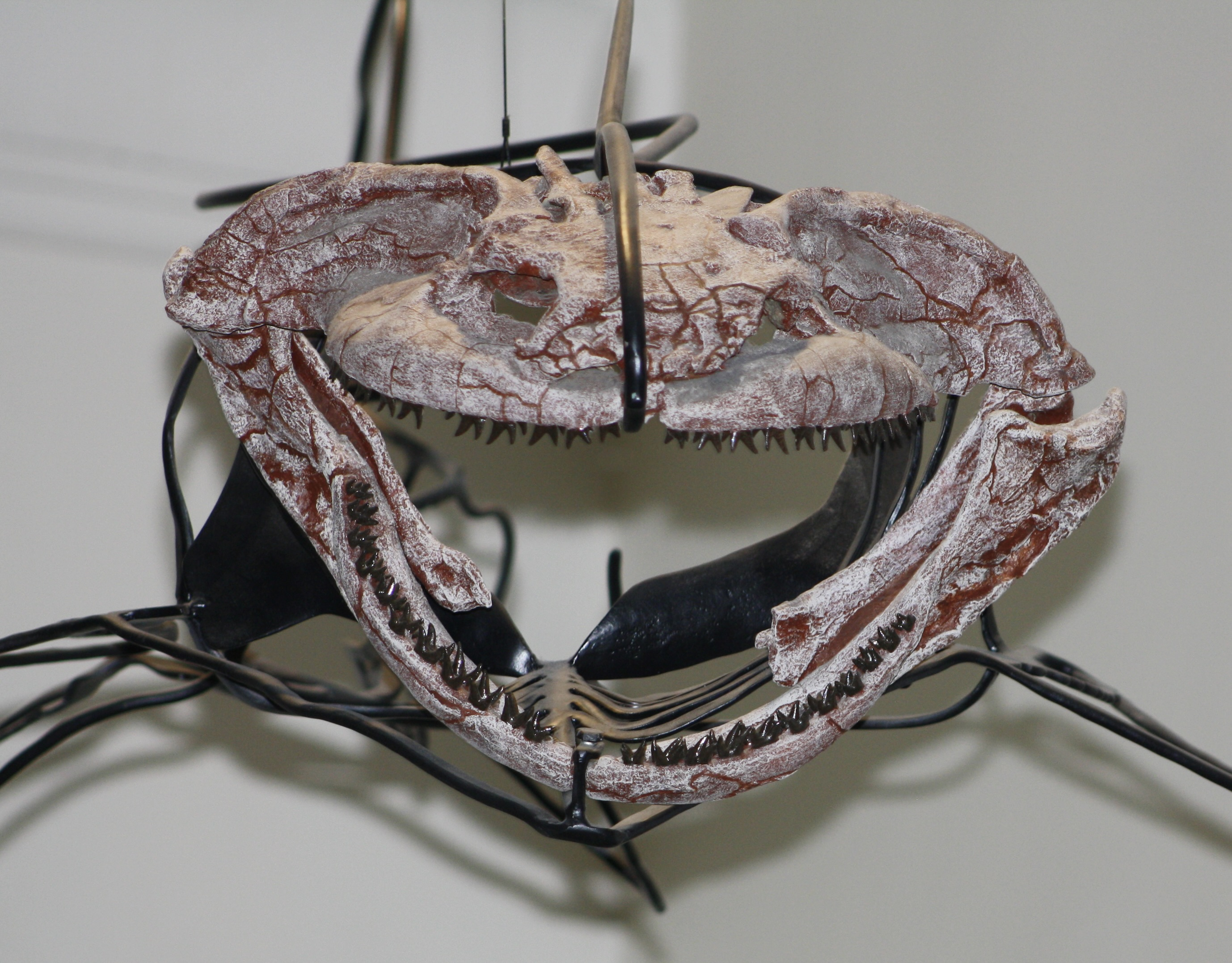
- Front view of skull, American Museum of Natural History

Scientific classification
- Kingdom: Animalia
- Phylum: Chordata
- Class: Chondrichthyes
- Subclass: Elasmobranchii
- Order: †Xenacanthiformes
- Family: †Orthacanthidae; Heyler and Poplin, 1989
- Genus: †Orthacanthus; Agassiz, 1843

Species
- Orthacanthus cylindricus (Agassiz, 1843); Orthacanthus adamas Babcock, 2024; Orthacanthus arcuatus (Newberry, 1857); Orthacanthus buxieri (Heyler and Poplin, 1989); Orthacanthus compressus (Newberry, 1857); Orthacanthus donnelljohnsi (Johnson and Thayer, 2009); Orthacanthus gibbosus (Agassiz, 1843); Orthacanthus gracilis (Giebel, 1848); Orthacanthus lintonensis Babcock, 2024; Orthacanthus milleri (Agassiz, 1843); Orthacanthus minor (Agassiz, 1843); Orthacanthus platypternus (Cope, 1884); Orthacanthus pustulosus (Agassiz, 1843); Orthacanthus texensis (Cope, 1888)

= Orthacanthus =

Orthacanthus Temporal range: Upper Carboniferous - Lower Permian

Extinct genus of cartilaginous fishes

Orthacanthus is an extinct genus of fresh-water xenacanthiform cartilaginous fish, named by Louis Agassiz in 1843, ranging from the Upper Carboniferous into the Lower Permian. Orthacanthus had a nektobenthic life habitat, with a carnivorous diet. Multiple authors have also discovered evidence of cannibalism in the diet of Orthacanthus and of "filial cannibalism" where adult Orthacanthus preyed upon juvenile Orthacanthus. Synonyms of the genus Orthacanthus are Dittodus Owen, 1867, Didymodus Cope, 1883, Diplodus Agassiz, 1843, Chilodus Giebel, 1848 (preoccupied by Chilodus Müller & Troschel, 1844).

During the Late Carboniferous-Early Permian, Orthacanthus was an apex predator of freshwater swamps and bayous in Europe and North America. Mature Orthacanthus reached nearly 3 meters (10 feet) in length. Orthacanthus teeth have a minimum of three cusps, two principal cusps, and an intermediate cusp, where the principal cusps are variously serrated, with complex base morphology. Additionally, Orthacanthus can be diagnosed by major transverse axes of proximal ends at a 45-degree angle to and often almost parallel to the labial margin of the base between the cusps. Deformed teeth are characteristic of the xenacanthiform sharks and of Orthacanthus.

== Discovery and history ==
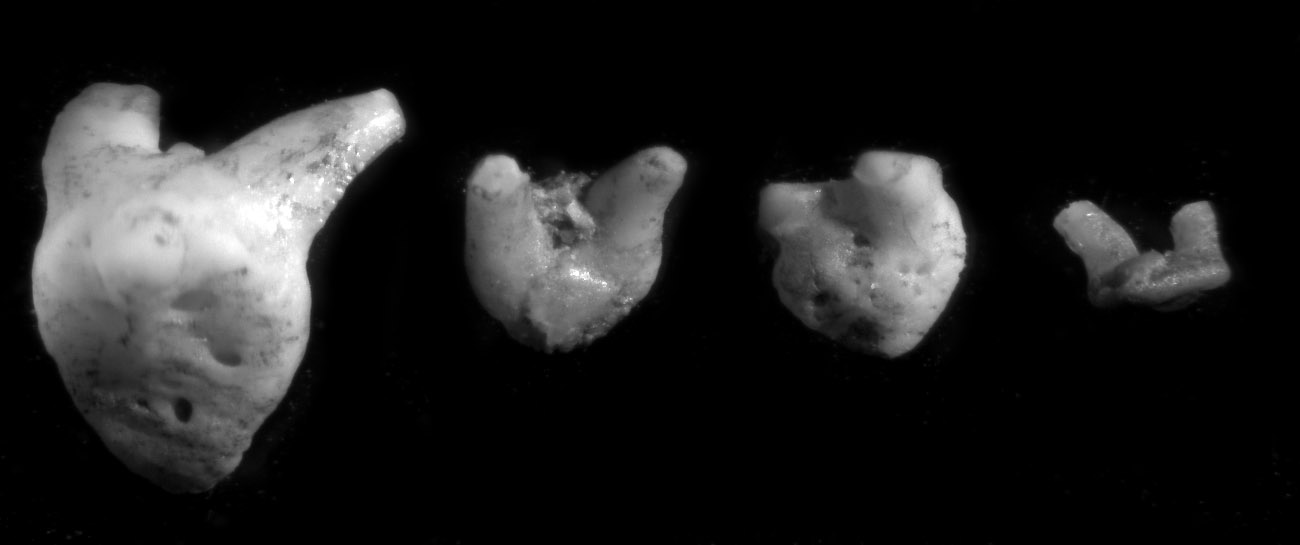
Orthacanthus teeth from the Halgaito shale

The two genera Orthacanthus and Pleuracanthus were erected by Louis Agassiz based on isolated "ichthyodorulites" from the British Carboniferous System, and at the time were mistakenly thought of as the first indicators of skates. They were initially found in the United Kingdom in Dudley, Leeds, North Wales, Carluke, and Edinburgh. Three additional species from the Carboniferous formation of Ohio were described by John Strong Newberry, but two of them were junior homonyms of another species, Orthacanthus gracilis (Giebel, 1848). Accordingly, these two species received replacement names, O. adamas Babcock 2024 and O. lintonensis Babcock, 2024. Teeth associated with Diplodus, a genus of sharks, was found in the Carboniferous slates of England in Stafford, Carluke, and Burdiehouse, and in Nova Scotia. A well preserved impression from Ruppelsdorf, Bohemia, was described by Goldfuss, and in a separate paper, the same specimen was described under the name Xenacanthus dechenii. One year later, in 1849, Dr. Jordan mistakenly identified this specimen as the remains of a fossil shark, Triodus sessilis. This mistake was corrected and the specimen was identified as Xenacanthus by Mr. Schnur.

== Description ==
=== Teeth ===
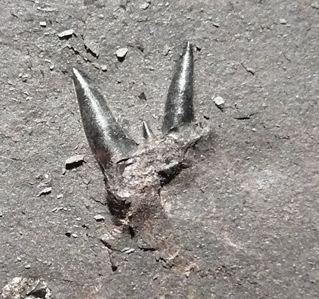
A tricuspid Orthacanthus tooth from Bolsovian shale at Whitehaven, Cumbria, England

The larger teeth of Orthacanthus compressus and Orthacanthus texensis are differentiated by a more pronounced basal tubercle in O. compressus. The basal tubercle of a typical tooth file is on the apical button of the underlying tooth. The larger adult teeth of O. compressus have a wider rather than longer base, similar to O. texensis, and tend to have serrations on both carinae of each cusp, while the medial carinae of smaller adult teeth are not serrated. The juvenile teeth of O. compressus are longer than wide, have a thinner base, and lack serrations, similar to O. platypternus teeth.

Orthacanthus platypternus from the Craddock Bonebed shark layer in Texas, USA, shows evidence of resorption, and the equivalent of an "enamel pearl." Some of the teeth specimens found at this location show evidence of resorption, which has not been previously observed in other faunal members at the same location. Where the superjacent basal tubercle is expected to be resorbed if the teeth were to undergo resorption, the apical button is resorbed instead.

=== Sexual Dimorphism ===
The difference in characteristics between the large and small O. compressus adult teeth might indicate sexual dimorphism.

The spines of O. platypternus showing 3 to 4 dentine layers are interpreted to be subadults or young adults, and are separated into two size classes where females have the largest spines in comparison to males, indicating sexual dimorphism.

=== Dorsal spine, dentine, and denticles ===
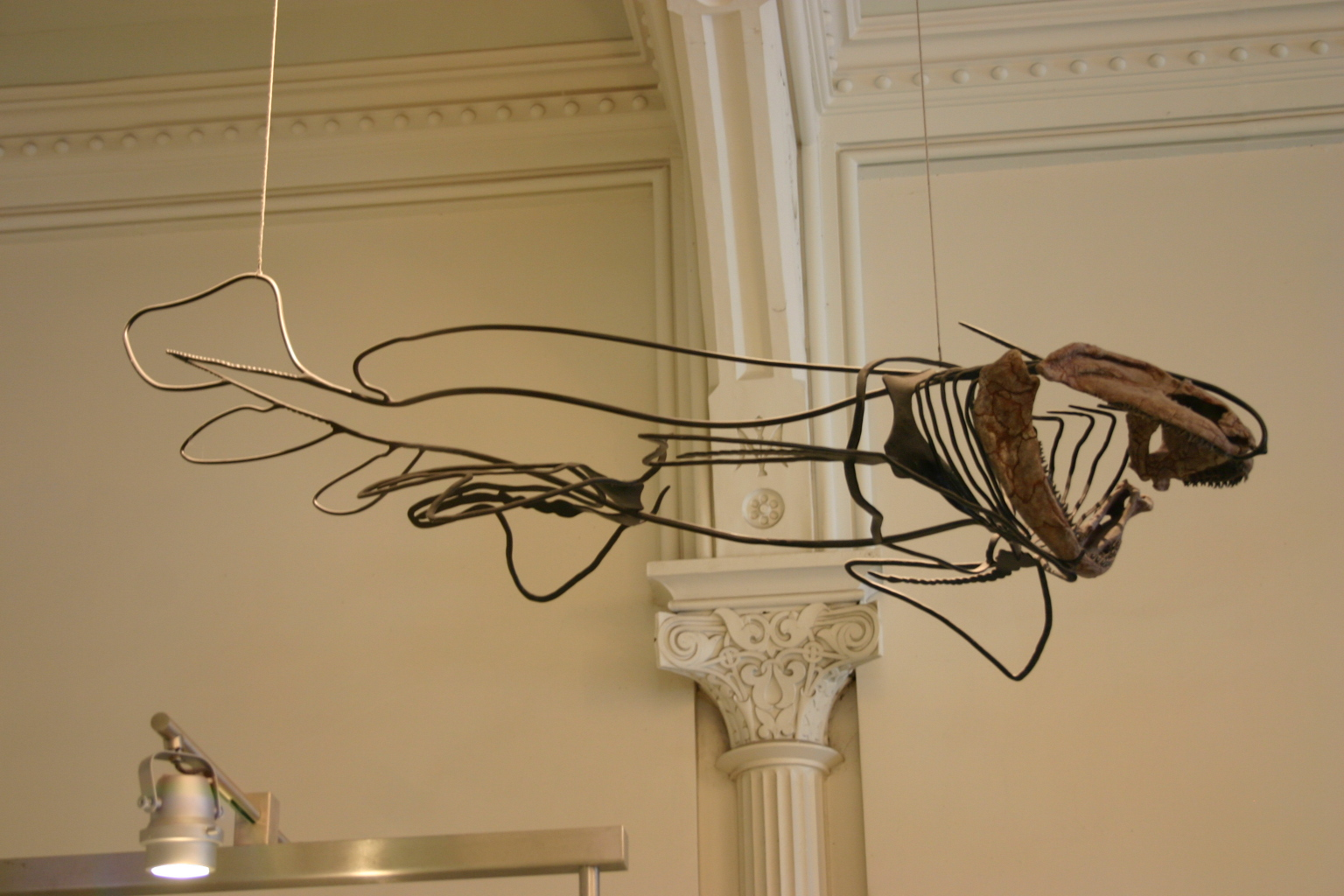
Skull in metal body reconstruction, AMNH

The dorsal spines of Orthacanthus platypternus from the Craddock Bone Bed in Texas, USA, preserve a highly vascularized wall mainly composed of centrifugally growing dentine (the outer layer of the wall of the spine) in a succession of inwardly growing dentine layers that line the pulp cavity. These dentine layers are likely deposited periodically in accordance with seasonal variations in water temperature and food availability. More specifically, the periodic nature of the dentine layer deposits could be due to variation in calcium phosphate deposition following the changes in water temperature. Spines of individuals with 1-2 dentine layers are likely juveniles and result in the smallest sizes, whereas individuals showing at least 3-4 dentine layers result in two separate size classes. The cross section is oval near the opening of the pulp cavity and circular/subtriangular in the distal part of the non-denticulated region and circular in the denticulated region. The pulp cavity of the spine is filled with calcite, quartz, and opaque minerals.

=== Occipital spine and denticles ===
Size compared to a human

The spine is superficially inserted in the skin, where it grows and moves from a deep position in the dermis where trabecular dentine forms, to a superficial location where centrifugally growing lamellar dentine forms. The number of denticles per annual cycle vary with growth rate, and are independent dermal elements formed by the dermal papilla and secondarily attached by dentine to the spine proper. The density of denticulation also varies with the growth rate of the occipital spine. The ratio of length of denticulated region to total length of the spine changes throughout ontogeny.

== Classification ==
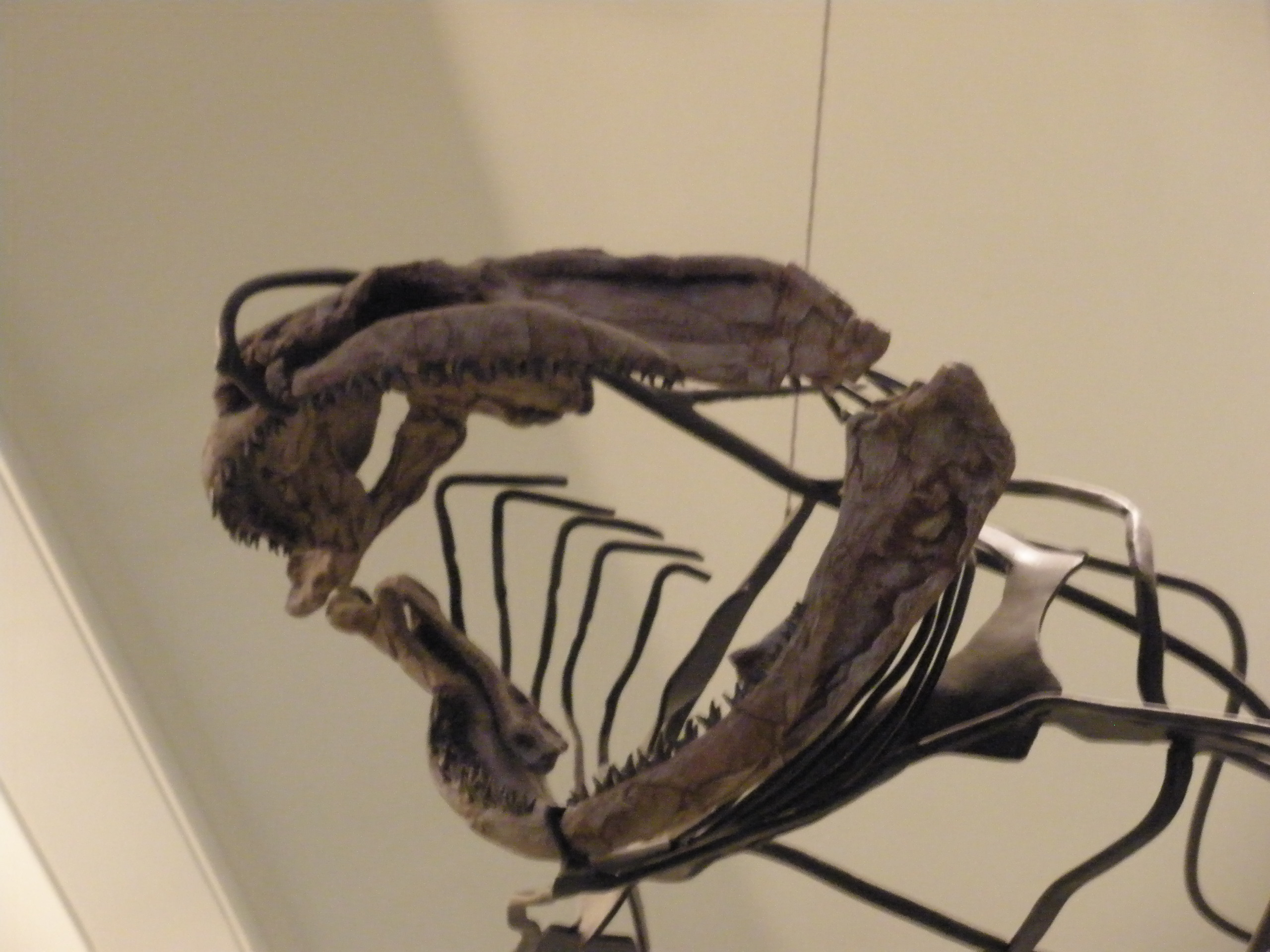
Skull, American Museum of Natural History

The teeth of Orthacanthus texensis and Orthacanthus platypternus from bonebeds from the Lower Permian of Texas, and the teeth of Orthacanthus compressus from the Upper Pennsylvanian of Nebraska and Dunkard Basin of the central Appalachians were used to determine the origin of O. texensis and O. platypternus. It has been proposed that both O. texensis and O. platypternus could be derived from O. compressus, where juvenile features of O. compressus are retained in the adult teeth of O. platypternus via paedomorphosis, and the juvenile features of O. compressus teeth are observed in the adult teeth of O. texensis.

Orthacanthus is placed within the broader order Xenacanthiformes, along with a number of other similar shark-like cartilaginous fish. The following cladogram follows a 2021 analysis by Luccisano and colleagues.

- Chondrichthyes
  - Holocephali (chimaeras and relatives)
  - Total group Elasmobranchii
    - - †Phoebodontiformes
      - - †Cladodoides (usually considered a "ctenacanth")
        - - †Tamiobatis (usually considered a "ctenacanth")
          - Xenacanthiformes
            - Triodus
            - Orthacanthus
    - Euselachii
      - †Hybodontiformes
      - Neoselachii
        - Selachii (modern sharks)
        - Batomorphi (rays, etc)

== Paleobiology ==
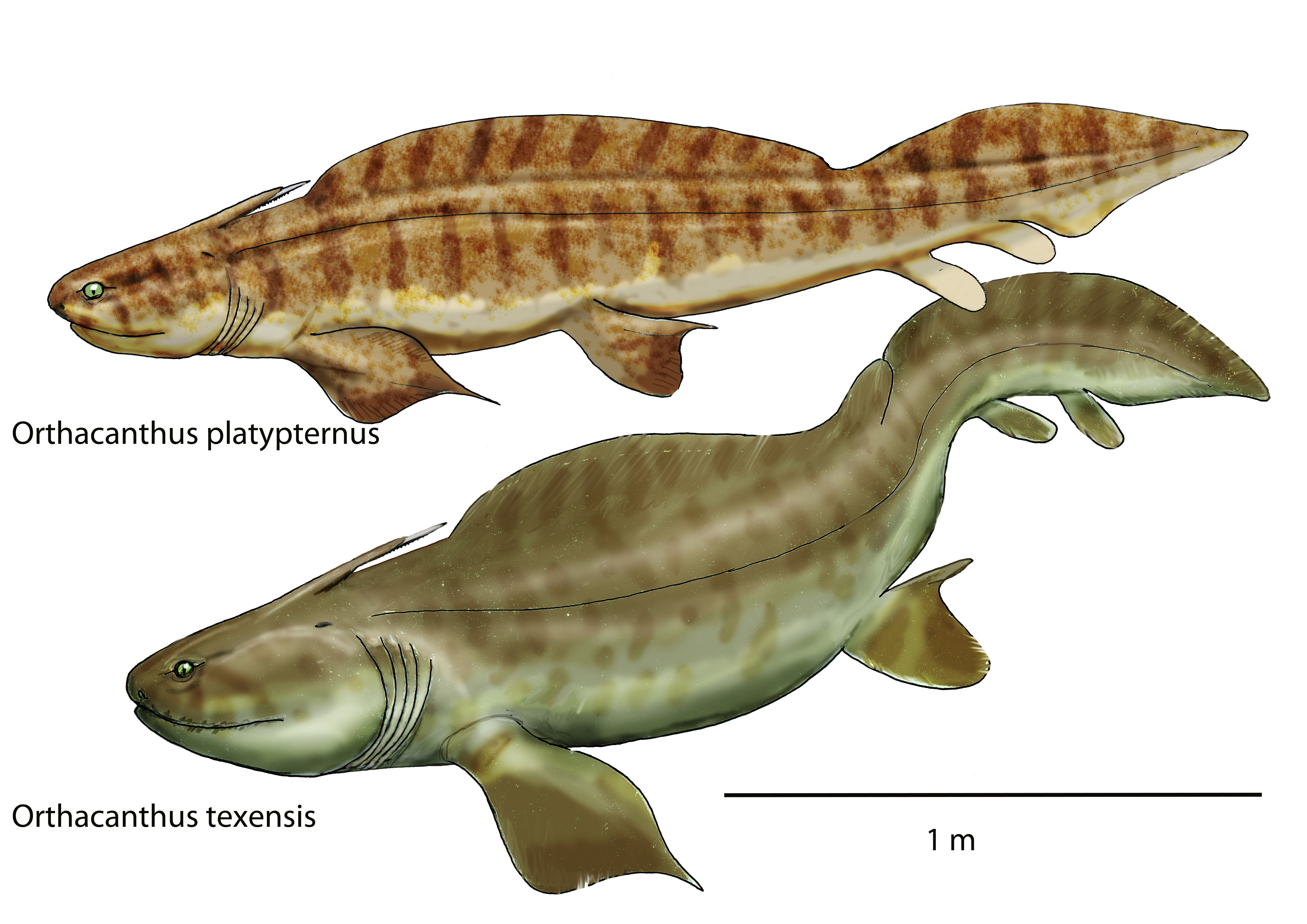
Life restoration of O. platypternus and O. texensis

A 2013 analysis of oxygen and strontium isotope composition of the teeth and spines of Late Carboniferous and Early Permian shark taxa was performed to infer the hydrochemistry of their ambient water, thus contributing to the controversy between an obligate freshwater or euryhaline diadromous lifestyle. Facies interpretations in the Permian of North America suggested that salinity tolerances of xenacanthiforms were restricted to near marine environments whereas only Orthacanthus could tolerate brackish water environments. A study covering the morphology and histology of dorsal spines of Orthacanthus platypternus also reported that "The comparative analyses of the ontogenetic stages of the recorded specimens of O. platypternus and their distribution along different facies and localities indicate that this species was euryhaline, diadromous with a catadromous life-cycle which was strongly regulated by the semi-arid, seasonally dry tropical climate affecting western Pangea during the Early Permian." The 2013 analysis provided evidence leaning towards an obligate freshwater lifestyle of the sharks from Variscan European basins, and nonmarine ratios suggested tooth formation was influenced by meteoric waves enriched by evaporation. Euryhaline adaptation was not confirmed in the 2013 analysis. Paired bioapatite δ^{18}O, δ^{13}C, and δ^{34}S analysis of O. buxieri suggested that the species was an inhabitant of freshwater lakes.

=== Predator-Prey relationship ===
Orthacanthus and Triodus have a predator-prey relationship in which Orthacanthus preyed on Triodus. Cranial remains of specimens of both Orthacanthus and Triodus from the Upper Carboniferous in Puertollano basin, Spain, give evidence of this predator-prey relationship. Numerous and well preserved cephalic elements of Triodus were associated with the cranial remains of Orthacanthus, and is explained by the inclusion of occipital spines of Triodus in the buccal cavity of Orthacanthus. Additional evidence is the co-occurrence of one Orthacanthus spine with many Triodus spines, which likely penetrated the soft tissue and cartilage of the mouth of Orthacanthus, similarly to modern sharks that feed on stingrays where the spines of stingrays have been found within and around the buccal cavities of Carcharhinus, Galeocerdo, Negaprion and Sphyrna.

Examination of Orthacanthus coprolites from Canada by Aodhan O' Gogain et al. revealed that in times of hardship, Orthacanthus was likely cannibalistic, as teeth from juvenile Orthacanthus were found within the coprolites of adults. Orthacanthus had a diet that consisted of actinopterygians, acanthodians, dipnoans, xenacanthids and tetrapods, based on analysis of coprolites and gut contents. There have also been suspicions of filial cannibalism due to the presence of juvenile Orthacanthus teeth inside an Orthacanthus coprolite. The feces of Orthacanthus has a spiral shape due to a corkscrew-shaped rectum.

== Paleoecology ==
The paleobiogeographical distribution of O. platypternus suggests ontogenetic habitat partitioning. Ontogenetic niche theory predicts that individuals may change their habitat or diet to maintain optimal growth rates or to improve trade-offs between mortality risk and growth. While smaller individuals likely lived in shallower waters such as in small ponds and stream channels of the coastal plain, larger individuals likely lived in deeper water such as the fluvio-lacustrine (rivers and lakes) and marginal marine areas.

The oldest known specimen of Orthacanthus, Diplodus problematicus, was found in New Brunswick, Canada, in the Lower Devonian (Emsian, c. 407 to 393 million years ago). Other specimens have been found in locations including the US, the United Kingdom, Poland, and France.
