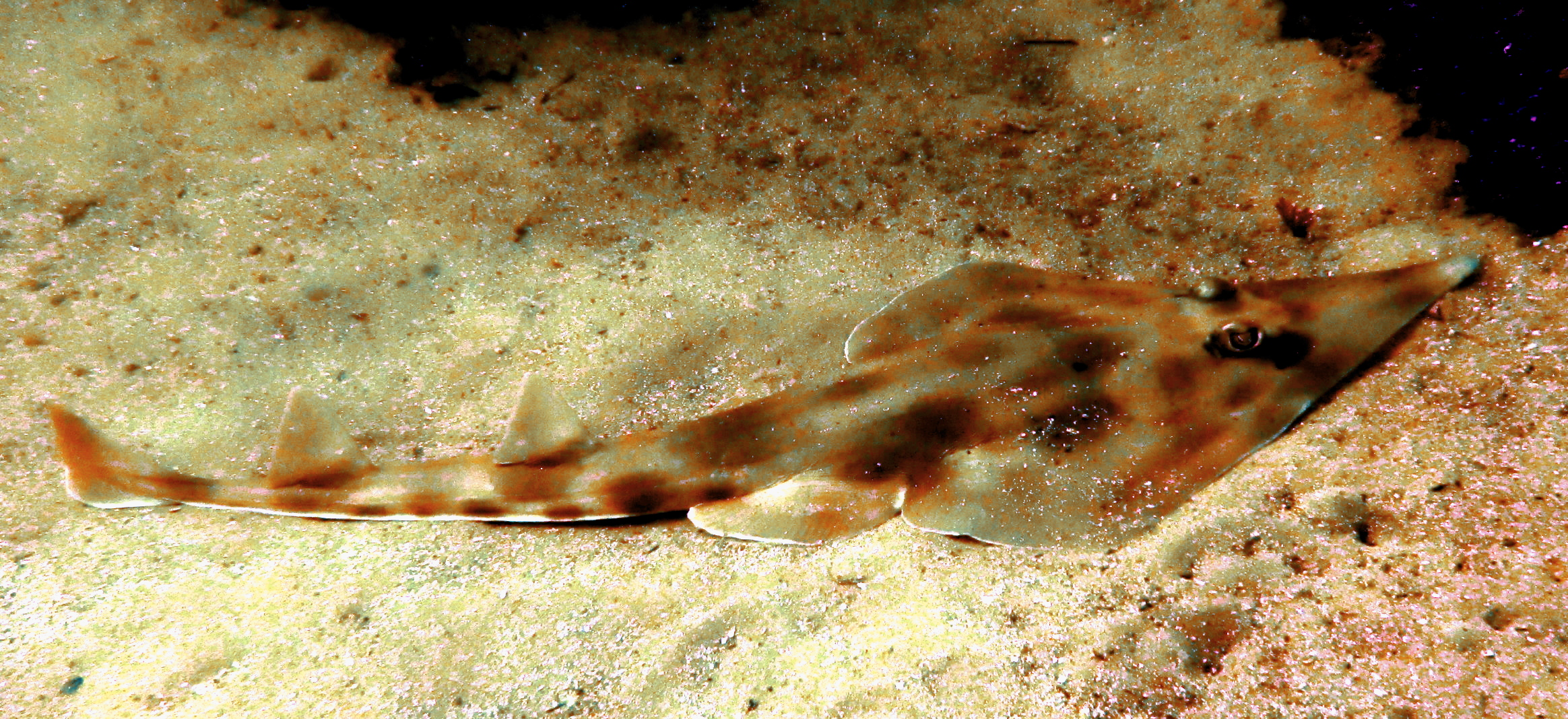

Conservation status
- Least Concern (IUCN 3.1)

Scientific classification
- Kingdom: Animalia
- Phylum: Chordata
- Class: Chondrichthyes
- Subclass: Elasmobranchii
- Order: Rhinopristiformes
- Family: Trygonorrhinidae
- Genus: Aptychotrema
- Species: A. rostrata

Binomial name
- Aptychotrema rostrata (G. Shaw, 1794)

Synonyms
- Raja rostrata Shaw, 1794; Rhinobatus banksii Müller & Henle, 1841; Rhinobatus tuberculatus Macleay, 1882

= Eastern shovelnose ray =

Species of cartilaginous fish

The eastern shovelnose ray (Aptychotrema rostrata) is a species of guitarfish in the family Rhinobatidae of order Rhinopristiformes. The species is endemic to the east coast of Australia and inhabits subtropical and temperate waters from southern Queensland to southern New South Wales.

The eastern shovelnose ray is a small to medium size guitarfish reaching total lengths of 120 cm (47 in). Recent studies suggest the species may have trichromatic colour vision due to the discovery of three spectrally distinct cone visual pigments in the retinae. The eastern shovelnose ray expresses a difference in tooth and jaw structure according to sex, with males developing a more pronounced lower jaw, longer and sharper teeth, and greater jaw strength to enable males to grip a female's fin during mating. The diet of the eastern shovelnose ray consists predominantly of fish, molluscs and benthic invertebrates. Shovelnose rays are suction-crushing feeders and their teeth structure and shape enables them to grind their hard-bodied prey.

The eastern shovelnose ray has a distinct annual and seasonal reproductive cycle with the species mating in winter and giving birth to pups in the summer months. Litter size ranges from 4 to 20 pups with larger females giving birth to more young. The reproductive mode is yolk sac viviparous meaning the species develops multiple young at the same time as embryos are connected to a large external yolk sac which provides nutrients, eliminates waste and maintains respiration. This sac is gradually digested before the young are born.

Commercial trawling in New South Wales and Queensland report high catch rates of the eastern shovelnose ray, however, the limited knowledge of the reproductive biology of the species means the vulnerability of the eastern shovelnose ray cannot be accurately concluded. The species is also caught recreationally and by Indigenous Australians. The eastern shovelnose ray can be sold and eaten as seafood.

== Taxonomy ==
The Latin meaning of rostrata is 'beaked', suggesting that the eastern shovelnose ray was named after its triangular snout. The eastern shovelnose ray is an elasmobranch, a subclass of cartilaginous fish including sharks, rays, skates and sawfish — the modern descendants of the first jawed vertebrates. This subclass are generally apex predators and therefore occupy the highest trophic level in their ecosystems, meaning they are at the top of the food-chain. The rhinobatidae family, commonly known as guitarfish, are represented by four genera and eight species, three of which are found in New South Wales. Although related to sharks, Guitarfish differ significantly in appearance as they have a flat, ray-like disk formed by the joining of the head and pectoral fins. The species is referred to by a number of alternative names including: Australian Shovelnose Ray, Banjo Fish, Bank's Shovelnosed Ray, Common Shovelnose Ray, Eragoni, Long-snout Shovelnose Ray, and Shovelnose Shark. The eastern shovelnose ray is most closely related to the eastern fiddler ray, giant shovelnose ray, southern fiddler ray, and western shovelnose ray.

== Description ==
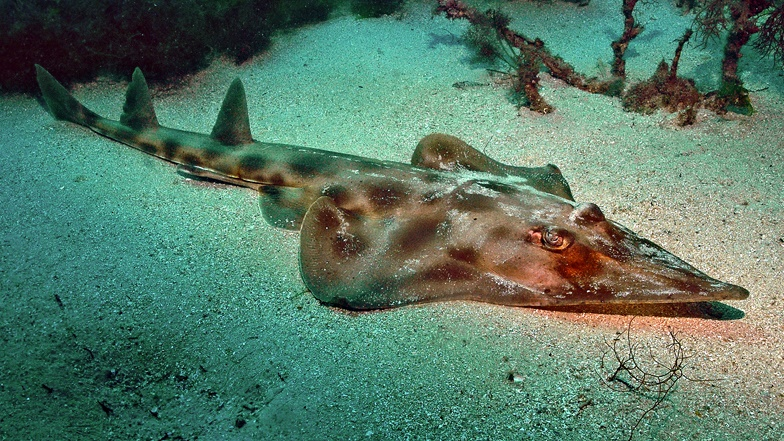
Eastern shovelnose ray (Aptychotrema rostrata) photographed at Murrays Beach, New South Wales

=== Appearance ===
The eastern shovelnose ray is a small to medium-sized guitarfish with a flat, wedge-shaped disc and elongated snout. The body features two dorsal fins of roughly equal size on top of a broad tail. The eastern shovelnose ray is generally sandy or brownish with darkish patches on its body, a blackish tip on the snout, bold orange patches visible in front of the eyes, and a pale underside with dark flecks. Its eyes are positioned on the dorsal surface.

=== Size ===
Maximum total length has been recorded to reach 120 cm (47 in), however, common lengths for mature adults are around 85 cm (33 in). A comparison of specimen records between New South Wales and Queensland has revealed that maximum total length and length at maturity differ across these regions with larger animals reaching maturity at greater lengths in New South Wales than in Queensland. The maximum weight of the species has been recorded at 4 kg (8.8 lb) with females generally larger in both mass and total length.

== Anatomy ==
=== Teeth ===
The eastern shovelnose ray expresses a difference in tooth and jaw structure according to sex, which is related to their mating habits. As they mature, males develop cuspidate teeth, a pronounced lower jaw and significantly longer and sharper teeth. There is also a disparity in jaw strength as mature males are significantly stronger than mature females. Earlier studies theorised this difference in teeth and jaw strength was due to different prey groups targeted by the sexes, however, there is insufficient empirical evidence to support this. Instead, it has been proven that these differences are to advantage a male during mating by strengthening a male's grip on a female's fin as it enables their bodies to be held together in order to facilitate clasper insertion. The teeth of the eastern shovelnose ray are not fused to the jaw but instead are attached to a fibrous connective tissue sheet, a characteristic common to elasmobranchs. This allows teeth to be continually replaced as needed.

=== Colour vision ===
Recent studies using microspectrophotometry suggest that the eastern shovelnose ray may have trichromatic colour vision due to the discovery of three spectrally distinct cone visual pigments in the retinae. This study was the first direct measurement of multiple cone visual pigments in an elasmobranch and demonstrates that the visual ecology of elasmobranchs is more complex than traditionally thought. Elasmobranchs were never thought to be able to discriminate colour but this study raises the possibility for some species. The eyes of elasmobranchs were previously understood to be best suited for dim light, however, the great amount of cone photoreceptors and the presence of a highly mobile pupil suggests that the eastern shovelnose ray is well-adapted to bright environments.

== Distribution and habitat ==
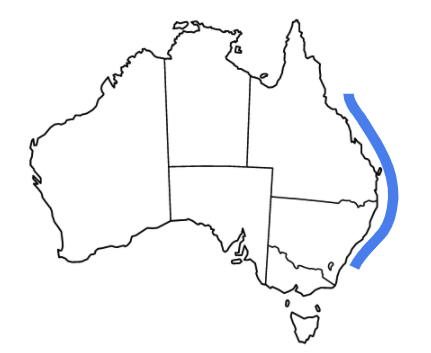
Distribution of the eastern shovelnose ray from southern Queensland to southern New South Wales.

The eastern shovelnose ray is endemic to the east coast of Australia. The distribution of the species ranges from southern Queensland to southern New South Wales between latitudes 27° and 36°S. The species inhabits subtropical and temperate waters, generally living in shallow waters over mudflats and sandflats as well as in estuaries and on rocky reefs. However, recent reports have recorded specimens collected from depths of up to 220 m (720 ft).

== Diet ==
The diet of the eastern shovelnose ray largely consists of fish, benthic invertebrates, and molluscs. Broken down into more detail, the eastern shovelnose ray's diet includes carid shrimps, penaeid prawns, stomatopods and crabs. Uncommon prey groups include amphipods, isopods and squid. Studies have shown differences in the diet of juveniles and mature individuals; prey ingested by mature specimens was generally larger than that of juveniles and carids are significantly more common in the diet of juveniles.

Elasmobranchs are unique in their large array of feeding habits and mechanisms, which is likely a result of the long evolutionary history of the group. These are far more diverse and advanced when compared with other animal groups composed of so few species. Shovelnose rays are suction-crushing feeders; the broad mouth and prominent jaw in combination with the suction mechanism enables large prey to be caught and consumed. The particular teeth shape and structure is significant as it enables the species to crush and grind their prey, which is crucial given their diet consists of hard-bodied organisms. Given their elongated body and extended pectoral fins it is speculated that the eastern shovelnose ray does not feed at great depths but more likely forages in shallow waters. Studies suggest that the eastern shovelnose ray has an important role in the trophic structure of Moreton Bay given its relative abundance and diet of benthic fauna.

== Reproductive biology ==
=== Reproductive cycle ===
The eastern shovelnose ray has an annual and seasonal reproductive cycle. However, studies undertaken in New South Wales and Queensland reveal slight differences in reproductive cycles, which is likely the result of variance in water temperature between the two locations. Generally, the species mates in winter (July/August), ovulates in November and gives birth in March after an average four-month gestation period during summer. Delayed ovulation and birth in summer may be a result of an adaptive mechanism to ensure pups are born in warmer conditions. Females relocate to shallower waters in summer to give birth. Unlike other rhinobatidae species found in the Northern Hemisphere, summer is not a period of high reproductive activity for the eastern shovelnose ray. Normal gestation period for the species is three to five months, which is significantly shorter than other rhinobatidae species whose gestation periods reach 12 months. Rhinobatidae produce one litter annually.

=== Reproductive parameters ===
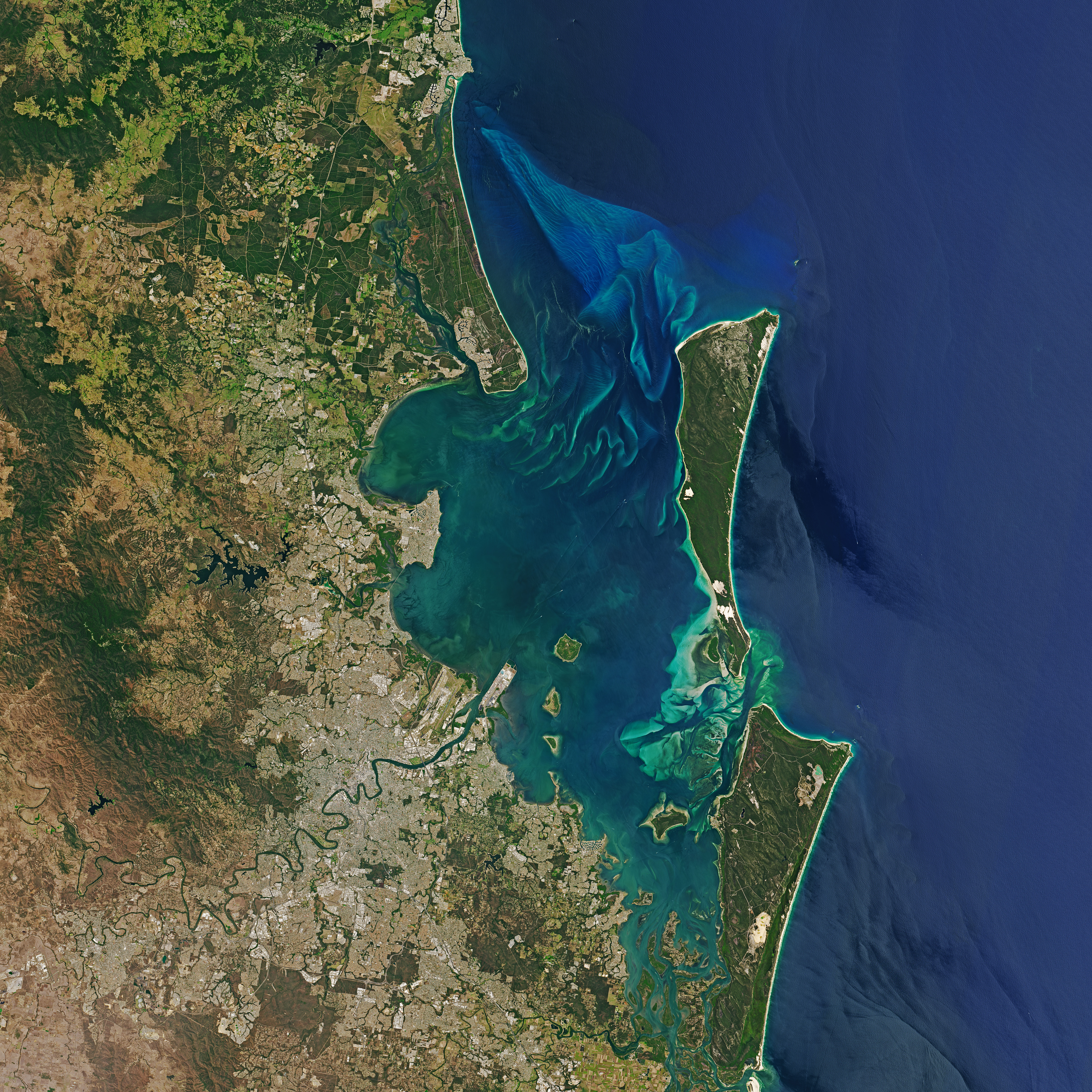
Satellite image of Moreton Bay, an area of high abundance of the eastern shovelnose ray in Queensland.

Reproductive parameters including the number of young, sex ratio, and maturity are essential to estimating the reproductive potential of a population. Multiple studies show the litter size of the eastern shovelnose ray ranges from 4 to 20 pups. Litter size was significantly correlated with maternal total length as larger females produce more pups. There is also a positive relationship between maternal length and ovum size. The sex ratio reported from a NSW study was 0.9:1.0 (female:male). Size at birth is around 13 to 15 cm (5.1 to 5.9 in) total length. Females tend to mature earlier and grow to larger sizes than males. However, the growth rate is similar for males and females but fast when compared to other elasmobranchs. Recorded ages of the eastern shovelnose ray reveal a significant disparity according to sex; the oldest female was 11 years old while the oldest male was 8 years old, however, this study is only the first estimate of life expectancy for the eastern shovelnose ray.

=== Reproductive mode ===
The eastern shovelnose ray is thought to be yolk sac viviparous, meaning that embryos develop within an egg in the uterus, however this has not been empirically tested. Elasmobranchs have developed a variety of reproductive adaptations in the uterus to provide young with nutrients, eliminate wastes, and maintain respiration. This reproductive mode allows for the development of multiple young at the same time. Embryos are connected to a large external yolk sac which is digested before birth.

== Importance to humans ==
=== Fishing ===
Commercial trawling in New South Wales and Queensland report high catch rates of the eastern shovelnose ray, however, the limited knowledge of the reproductive biology of the species means its vulnerability cannot be accurately assessed. Between 100 and 150 tonnes (98 and 148 long tons; 110 and 170 short tons) of 'fiddler' rays are caught each year in New South Wales, with around 75 per cent of this catch consisting of the eastern shovelnose ray. There is a high seasonal variation with double the amount of rhinobatidae landed in winter than in summer; this is likely linked to the migration patterns of the species as they move to shallower waters to give birth. While commercial trawling poses the greatest threat to the species, the eastern shovelnose ray is also fished for sport by anglers. Recreational fishing activities are extremely popular in Moreton Bay, where the species is abundant. Significant numbers are also caught by Indigenous Australians.

=== Seafood ===
The eastern shovelnose ray can be sold and eaten as seafood. The Sydney Fish Market recommends that tail meat is skinned and filleted for consumption. The firm flesh is generally boneless and has a mild flavour pairing well with butter, capers, citrus, and rosemary. The flesh is versatile and can be steamed, grilled, deep-fried, and used in soups, casseroles and curries.

== Conservation ==
A risk assessment of the species within the Great Barrier Reef Marine Park categorised prawn trawling as posing a high ecological risk to the species. Post-trawl survival (PTS) is a metric used to determine ecological risk posed by trawling, however, PTS is poorly understood for the eastern shovelnose ray. Field studies of discarded species from trawling revealed that total size was the best predictor of survival with larger animals more likely to survive. Increased tow duration leads to lower chances of survival for the species. The eastern shovelnose ray is currently listed as a species of least concern by the International Union for Conservation of Nature.
