= Shovelnose =

Shovelnose may refer to:

- A type of American Indian canoe
- A type of streamlined railway locomotive
- A banjo shark
