= Xyster =

Xyster may refer to:

- Xyster Framework, an open-source application framework for the computer scripting language PHP
- Zapteryx xyster, the southern banded guitarfish
