= Aptychotrema massoniae =

Aptychotrema massoniae Temporal range: Cenomanian

Scientific classification
- Kingdom: Animalia
- Phylum: Chordata
- Class: Chondrichthyes
- Subclass: Elasmobranchii
- Order: Rhinopristiformes
- Family: Trygonorrhinidae
- Genus: Aptychotrema
- Species: †A. massoniae

Binomial name
- †Aptychotrema massoniae Bernardez, 2002

Extinct species of cartilaginous fish

Aptychotrema massoniae is an extinct species of guitarfish, belonging to the family Rhinobatidae. Its only known fossil remains belong to the of Cenomanian age.
