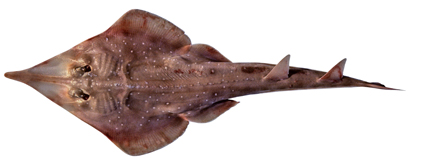

Conservation status
- Vulnerable (IUCN 3.1)

Scientific classification
- Kingdom: Animalia
- Phylum: Chordata
- Class: Chondrichthyes
- Subclass: Elasmobranchii
- Order: Rhinopristiformes
- Family: Trygonorrhinidae
- Genus: Aptychotrema
- Species: A. timorensis

Binomial name
- Aptychotrema timorensis Last, 2004

= Spotted shovelnose ray =

Species of cartilaginous fish

The spotted shovelnose ray (Aptychotrema timorensis) is a species of fish in the Rhinobatidae family. It is endemic to northern Australia. Its natural habitat is open seas.
