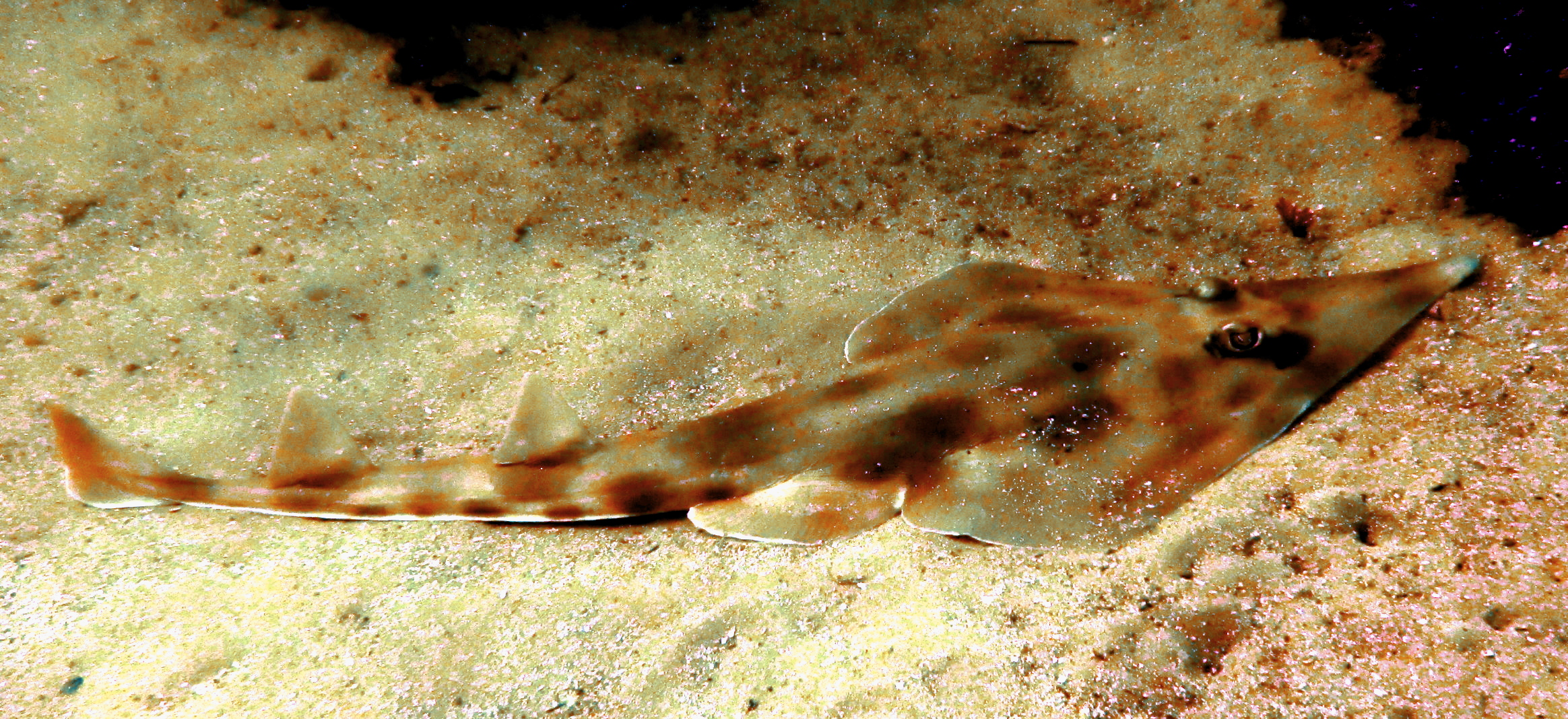
- Eastern shovelnose ray (A. rostrata)

Scientific classification
- Kingdom: Animalia
- Phylum: Chordata
- Class: Chondrichthyes
- Subclass: Elasmobranchii
- Order: Rhinopristiformes
- Family: Trygonorrhinidae
- Genus: Aptychotrema; Norman, 1926

Type species
- Rhinobatus (Syrrhina) bougainvillii J. P. Müller & Henle, 1841

= Aptychotrema =

Genus of cartilaginous fishes

Aptychotrema is a genus of guitarfish which belongs to the family Trygonorrhinidae. They were formerly classified in the family Rhinobatidae. They are found off the coast of Australia.

== Species ==
There are three living species, and one extinct species only known from fossil remains of Cenomanian age.

- †Aptychotrema massoniae Bernárdez, 2002
- Aptychotrema rostrata Shaw, 1794 (Eastern shovelnose ray or Short-snouted shovelnose ray) - synonym: Aptychotrema bougainvillii J. P. Müller & Henle, 1841
- Aptychotrema timorensis Last, 2004 (Spotted shovelnose ray)
- Aptychotrema vincentiana Haacke, 1885 (Western shovelnose ray)
