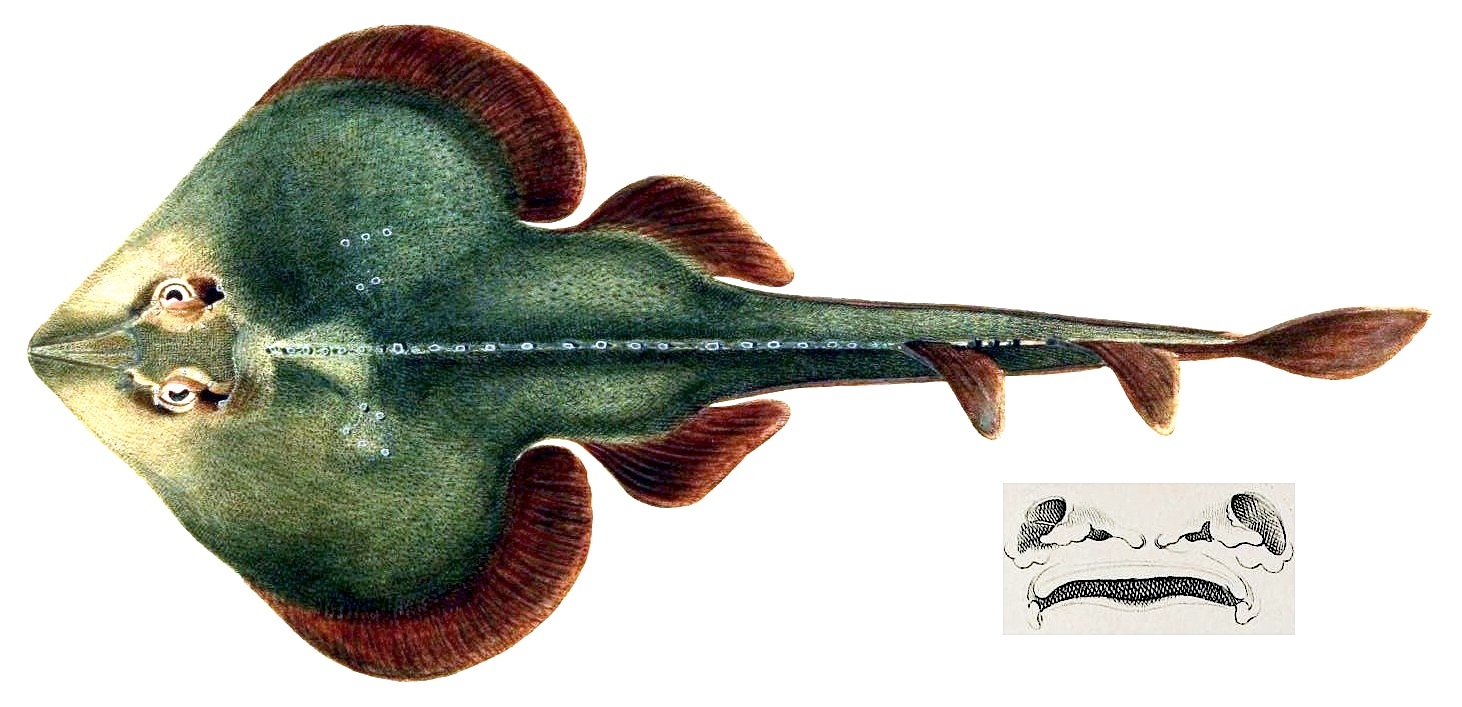

Conservation status
- Endangered (IUCN 3.1)

Scientific classification
- Kingdom: Animalia
- Phylum: Chordata
- Class: Chondrichthyes
- Subclass: Elasmobranchii
- Order: Rhinopristiformes
- Family: Trygonorrhinidae
- Genus: Zapteryx
- Species: Z. brevirostris

Binomial name
- Zapteryx brevirostris (J. P. Müller & Henle, 1841)

= Shortnose guitarfish =

Species of cartilaginous fish

The shortnose guitarfish (Zapteryx brevirostris) is a species of fish in the Trygonorrhinidae family. The guitarfish has become critically endangered because of the rapid decline caused by overfishing. The subsequent accidental catch and release of the shortnose guitarfish can also lead to its endangered conservation status.

== Habitat ==
The shortnose guitarfish is found in the southwest Atlantic in coastal parts near sandy sea floors of southeastern Brazil, through Uruguay, to northeast Argentina. While the guitarfish is reported to range in northeast Argentina, there are reports of them traveling down to the Falkland Islands. This voyage could be due to Brazil's current changing in the summer months. They are a benthic inshore species that inhabits the soft bottom on the ocean up to about 50 meters deep.

== Morphology ==
The average length of the shortnose guitarfish that has been recorded for females is 66.1 cm whereas the male average length is 63.5 cm. They have an obtuse snout shape with a broader heart shaped disk body. The color of the shortnose guitarfish typically ranges from a brownish gray to olive color on their backs.

== Diet ==
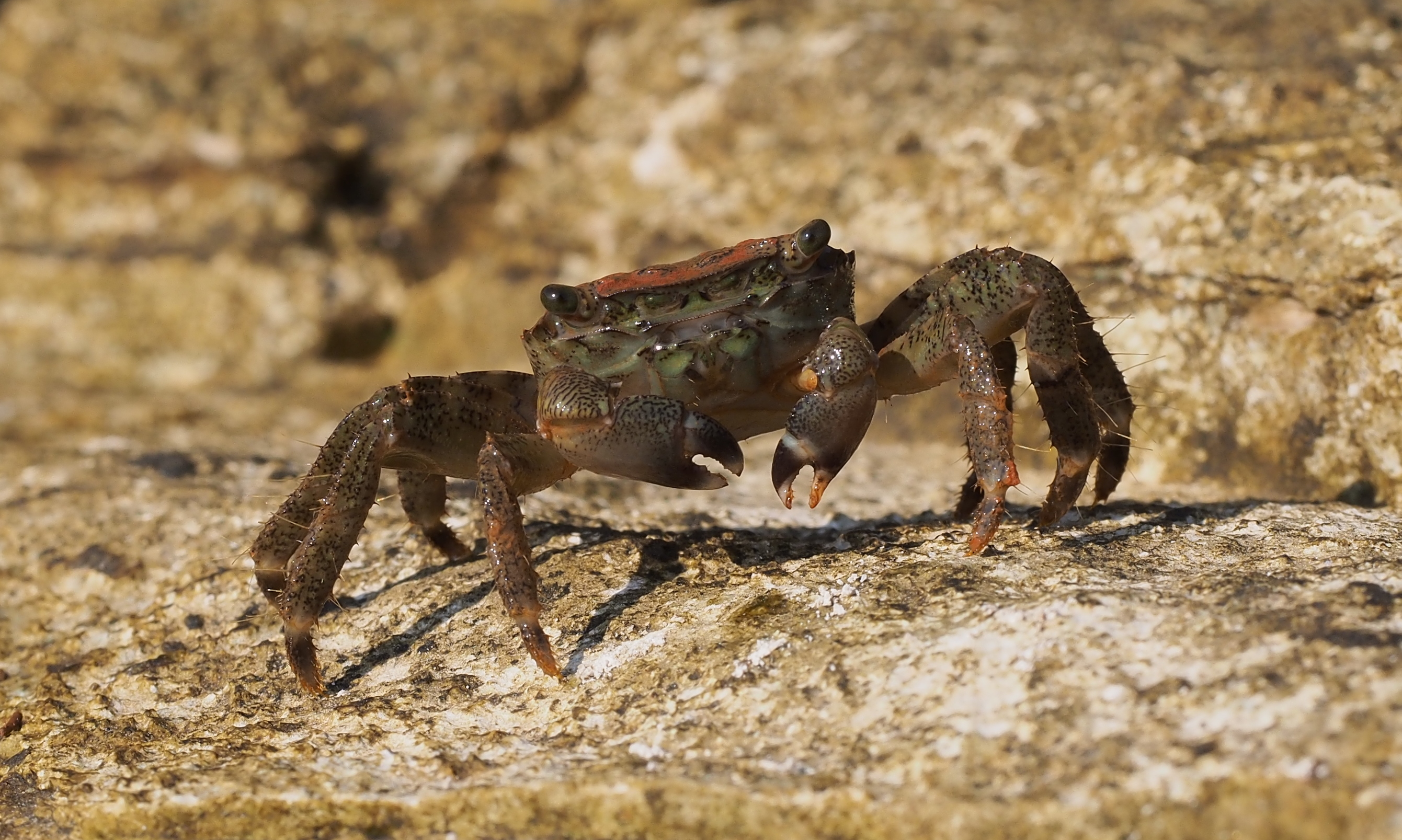

The diet of the shortnose guitarfish includes amphipods, polychaetes, lancelets, decapods, cumaceans and isopods. In layman's terms, this consists mostly of crabs, worms, clams and small fishes. The diet of the shortnose guitarfish changes as the individual gets larger, larger guitarfish predominantly eat isopods, decapods and polychaetes and less amphipods. The shortnose guitarfish also is shown to regurgitate its food to remove bones, exoskeletons and other indigestible items.

== Birth and growth ==
The shortnose guitarfish, like many other rays, have characteristics such as slow growth, later sexual maturity and smaller number of births to young. The estimated gestational length was between 9 and 12 months. As the shortnose guitarfish grow and mature, the females tend to be larger than the males, but the females grow at a slower rate and reach sexual maturity at a later age than males. Sexual maturity for females is reached when they get to an average length of 42 cm while sexual maturity for males is reached at an average length found to be 43.7 cm. The shortnose guitarfish birth up to eight pups typically in the autumn season.

A substrate that is sand-like is beneficial to their growth especially in captivity since they benefit from burying themselves from predators. Without a substrate in their enclosed habitat, they can have weight loss and even be seen doing the "shaking motion" of burying themselves without any substrate present.

== Breathing function ==
The shortnose guitarfish can breathe using two main methods including, obligate ram ventilation and active ventilation. Benthic species, including the shortnose guitarfish, unlike other aquatic species do not need to keep constant movement in order to breathe. These benthic species are capable of pumping water through their gills while stationary known as active ventilation. Obligate ram ventilation can be seen when the shortnose guitarfish is swimming with the mouth open slightly and the gills being partly flared allowing for the guitarfish to get adequate oxygen.

Spiracles are structures in the gills that aid in gill ventilation and are also association with mating. Weak electric field can be generated by the spiracle movement and is detected during the mating process.

== Stress responses ==
Sharks and rays, including the shortnose guitarfish, have been seen to "hyperventilate" when introduced to a stressor in order to increase the amount of oxygen to allow them to react via fight or flight. In stressful situations when oxygen cannot be supplied quick enough, lactic acidosis can occur. Lactic acidosis occurs when the tissues do not get enough oxygen and start producing lactic acid and starts to turn the body pH slightly acidic. Studies can be done using this hyperventilation breathing rate to determine what their stressors are, in this case it is important to get a baseline breathing rate.

Eye retraction occurs in the shortnose guitarfish to protect the eye from irritants, parasites and predation as well as cleaning and humidification of the eyes. Although this is an instantaneous response that typically lasts for one to a couple seconds, it was seen in one specimen who was transported from the United States to Japan that kept its eyes retracted for ten days after transport indicating a stress response.

Spiracle movement in the gills can also be assessed to determine stressors in the shortnose guitarfish. Stronger spiracle pumping can inform scientists how stressed an individual is while weaker spiracle pumping can also indicate how rested or debilitated the organism is. In severe cases where there is a very high stress level, the shortnose guitarfish can close the spiracles and keep them closed for a long time, typically this is induced by commercial fishing and accidental capture.

It is also seen that upon accidental capture of the shortnose guitarfish, all females have aborted their young in response.

== Parasitic concerns ==
Upon the accidental captures of shortnose guitarfish, parasites are found and removed from the individual, specifically Nerocila acuminata. This species is part of the family Cymothoidae and contains over 60 species of parasites that attach to the fins or bodies of aquatic species. The presence of the parasite Nerocila acuminata can damage the shortnose guitarfish along with other aquatic species fins by causing gill filament atrophy and can sometimes obstruct the mouth of the individual leading to changed behavior and sometimes death. Gill filament atrophy occurs when the gills are damaged and can shrink, degenerate or lose the gill filament altogether. The parasite gets its nutrition from the aquatic species mainly by feeding on the host's blood but can sometimes feed on mucus as well. There have currently only a handful of shortnose guitarfish that were seen with this parasite, Nerocila acuminata, and all individuals had the parasite removed and were released into the wild with no damage done. More research still needs to be completed in order to further investigate the relationship and concern that parasites can have on the endangered shortnose guitarfish.

== Human influence ==
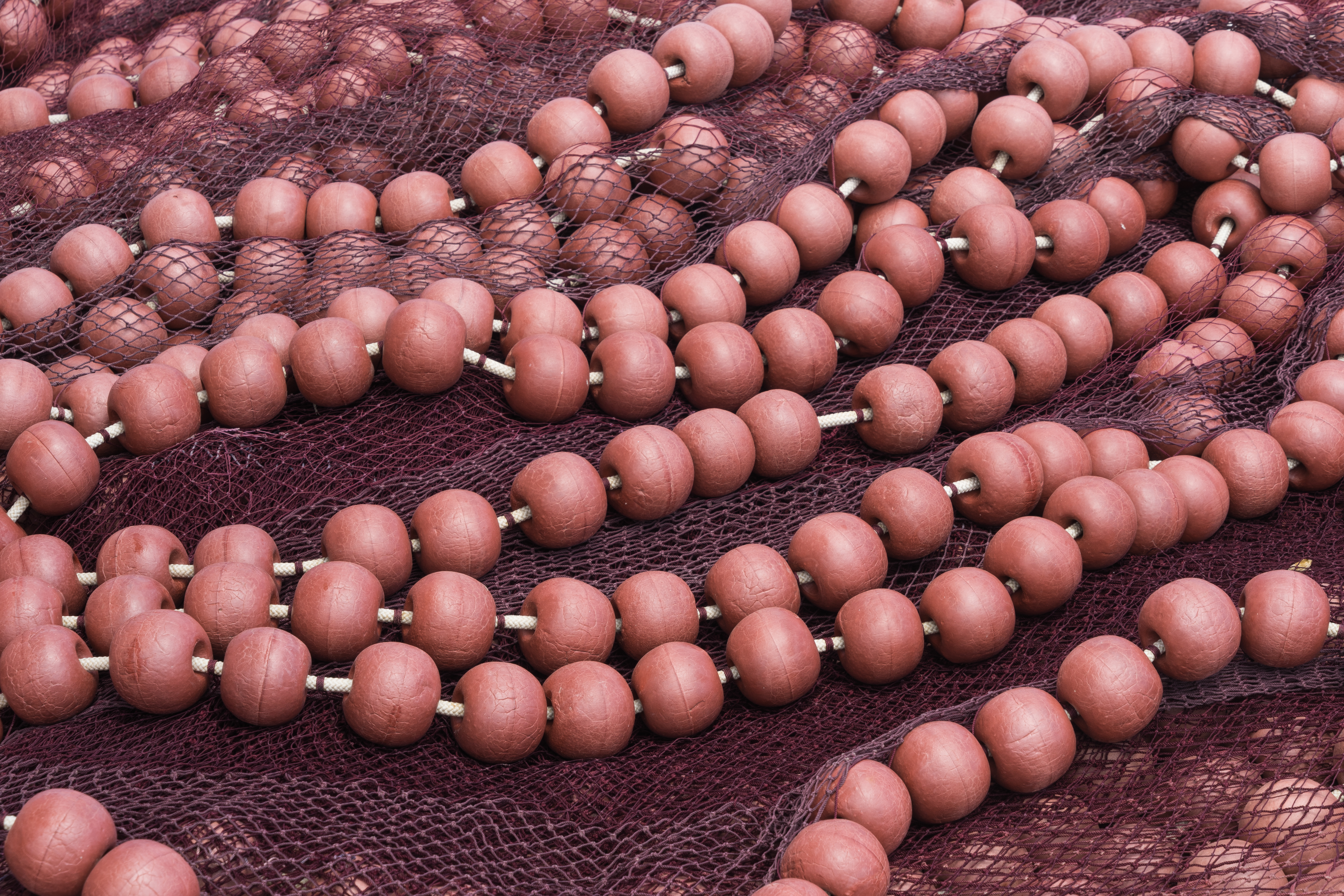
Fishing net

There is now growing evidence that the catch and release of many Elasmobranchs can cause psychological harm to the individuals. In addition, shortnose guitarfish are more sensitive to capture during gestation whereas the embryos are likely to be aborted after capture and release. When pregnant females are captured, all of females had abortions of their young and most of the females subsequently died after these abortions. The main cause of death and the cause of the IUCN Endangered list is because of fishing pressures including commercial fishing.
