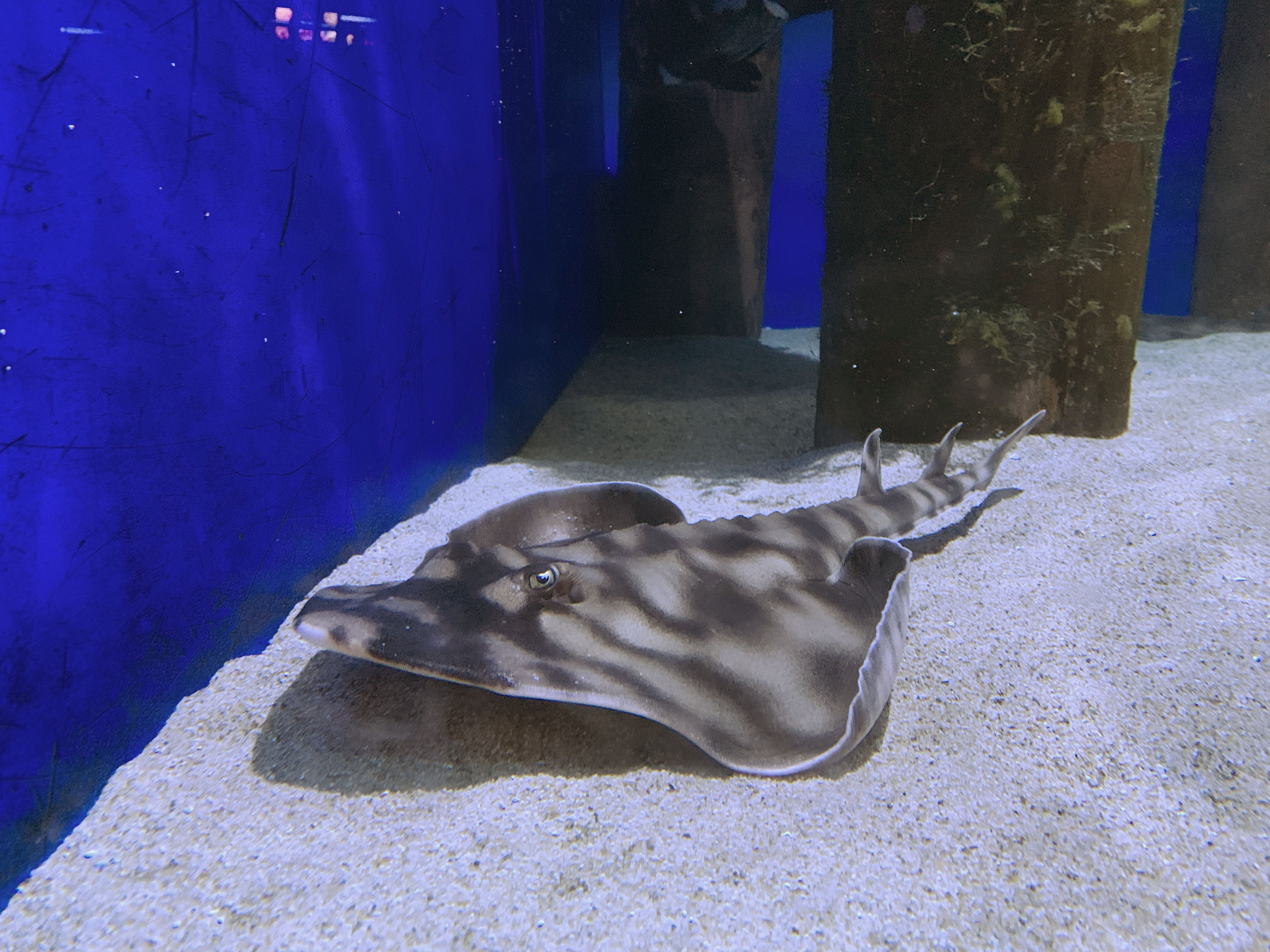

Conservation status
- Data Deficient (IUCN 3.1)

Scientific classification
- Kingdom: Animalia
- Phylum: Chordata
- Class: Chondrichthyes
- Subclass: Elasmobranchii
- Order: Rhinopristiformes
- Family: Trygonorrhinidae
- Genus: Zapteryx
- Species: Z. exasperata

Binomial name
- Zapteryx exasperata (D. S. Jordan & C. H. Gilbert, 1880)

= Banded guitarfish =

Species of cartilaginous fish

The banded guitarfish, mottled guitarfish, prickly skate or striped guitarfish (Zapteryx exasperata) is a species of fish in the Trygonorrhinidae family. Originally Z. exasperata was placed in the Rhinobatidae family, however recent mitochondrial DNA analysis shows their placement into the new family of Trygonorrhinidae. They are found from shallow water to a depth of 200 m (660 ft) in the East Pacific from California, United States, to Mazatlan, Mexico, including the Gulf of California. The species has also been recorded further south (as far as Peru), but this likely involves its close relative, the southern banded guitarfish (Z. xyster).

== Characteristics ==
Banded guitarfish have diamond-shaped bodies that, as their name suggests, resemble guitars. Their coloration is dark gray to sandy brown with characteristic black or dark brown banding along the back. They generally have large eyes with a short, rounded snout. The tail is thick from the base of the disc to its rounded caudal fin and is equal or shorter in length to its disc. Banded guitarfish have a rough textured skin caused by prickles or tiny spikes throughout the dorsal surface with a line of large spikes in the middle running to the first dorsal fin. Since Z. exasperata is very closely related to Zapteryx xyster, they are relatively hard to differentiate from each other. Some distinguishing characteristics between the two are Z. exasperata has a disc that is equally long as wide and lacks yellow eyespots found on Z. xyster.

The oldest banded guitarfish researched was estimated to be 22 years old. Females and males were found to have an average age of 18 and 14 years old, respectively. The maximum total length (TL) recorded is 124 cm. Banded guitarfish demonstrate allometric growth and sexual dimorphism as females are much larger than males.

== Human impacts ==
Banded guitarfish are a data deficient species according to the IUCN. Z. exasperata are mainly caught in commercial and artisanal gillnet fisheries in Mexican waters especially the Gulf of California, Mexico. The reproduction period in spring is the most common time they are caught within depths ranging from 9–22 m deep. These fisheries impact the reproduction of banded guitarfish, but no conservation actions are currently in place. Banded guitarfish are harmless to humans and tend to be skittish when approached.

== Diet ==
Banded guitarfish are a high trophic level species, being a top predator in benthic communities on coastal rocky reefs. They are mostly bottom feeders, but adults have been found to eat pelagic fish making them benthopelagic predators as well. Banded guitarfish are specialist feeders whose main prey consists of invertebrates, crustaceans (mainly crabs), and teleost's. Z. exasperata are thought to have an ontogenetic diet shift, meaning a change in diet over the lifespan of the organism. Both Juveniles and adults consume crustaceans (mainly consumed by juveniles) and demersal fish, mostly Daisy midshipman. Daisy midshipman uses the same rocky reef habitat and time for reproduction making it an abundant food source for banded guitarfish.

== Reproduction ==
The reproductive cycle of banded guitarfish is a year long. Gestation is thought to be 3–4 months followed by birth in shallow, sandy bays in late July or early August when the temperatures are the warmest. The warm temperature increases the outcomes of the neonate growth and survival since they are ectothermic poikilotherms, meaning they depend on the environment for body heat that controls metabolism and growth. Litter sizes are dependent on the size of the female and range from 4-11 offspring with an average of 7 offspring. The average birth size of the neonates is 18 cm TL. Males are considered sexually mature once they are 68 cm TL or around 7 years of age; females are around 77 cm TL or about 9 years of age when thought to be mature. Banded guitarfish have a low population growth because they produce small amounts of offspring per cycle that mature slow. Their embryo development is categorized as lecithotrophy yolk sac viviparity, meaning the egg is hatched in the mother and the embryo utilizes a yolk sac as their main nutritional source. It has been found within the adult population more females are present compared to males, but embryos are found in equal amounts.

Depending on the environment banded guitarfish have different reproduction cycles and socialization patterns. There is a known sexual segregation in Baja California Sur, Mexico, where females are found in shallow areas for birth but males are not. They only meet again in the spring months to reproduce, separating shortly after. The ovarian cycle is also thought to occur way before the rest of the reproductive cycle unlike the banded guitarfish in the Gulf of California where gestation occurs immediately following the ovarian cycle. In the Gulf of California, banded guitarfish also undergo embryonic diapause, so babies are still born in July or early August. Sexual segregation is not seen in banded guitarfish Living in the Gulf of California. It is thought that environmental pressures could play a role in these differences but not much research has been done to find the exact reason.
