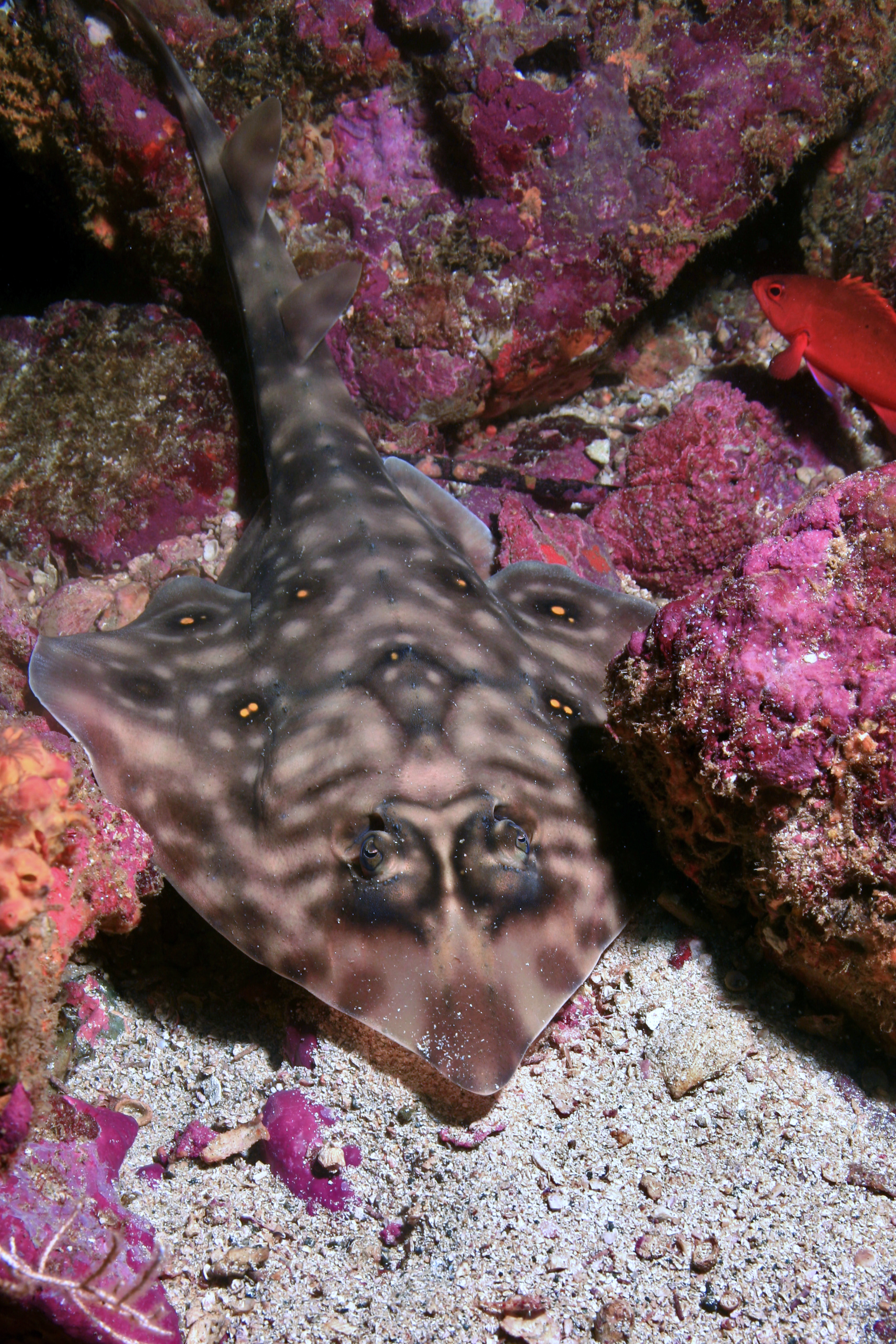
- Zapteryx xyster

Scientific classification
- Kingdom: Animalia
- Phylum: Chordata
- Class: Chondrichthyes
- Subclass: Elasmobranchii
- Order: Rhinopristiformes
- Family: Trygonorrhinidae
- Genus: Zapteryx; D. S. Jordan & C. H. Gilbert, 1880

= Zapteryx =

Genus of cartilaginous fishes

Zapteryx is a genus of fish in the Trygonorrhinidae family found in coastal parts of the Americas. Zapteryx was formerly placed in Rhinobatidae (guitarfishes), as seen in Nelson's 2006 Fishes of the World, but this classification has been superseded.

== Species ==
- †Zapteryx bichuti Signeux, 1961
- Zapteryx brevirostris J. P. Müller & Henle, 1841 (shortnose guitarfish)
- Zapteryx exasperata D. S. Jordan & C. H. Gilbert, 1880 (banded guitarfish)
- Zapteryx xyster D. S. Jordan & Evermann, 1896 (southern banded guitarfish)
