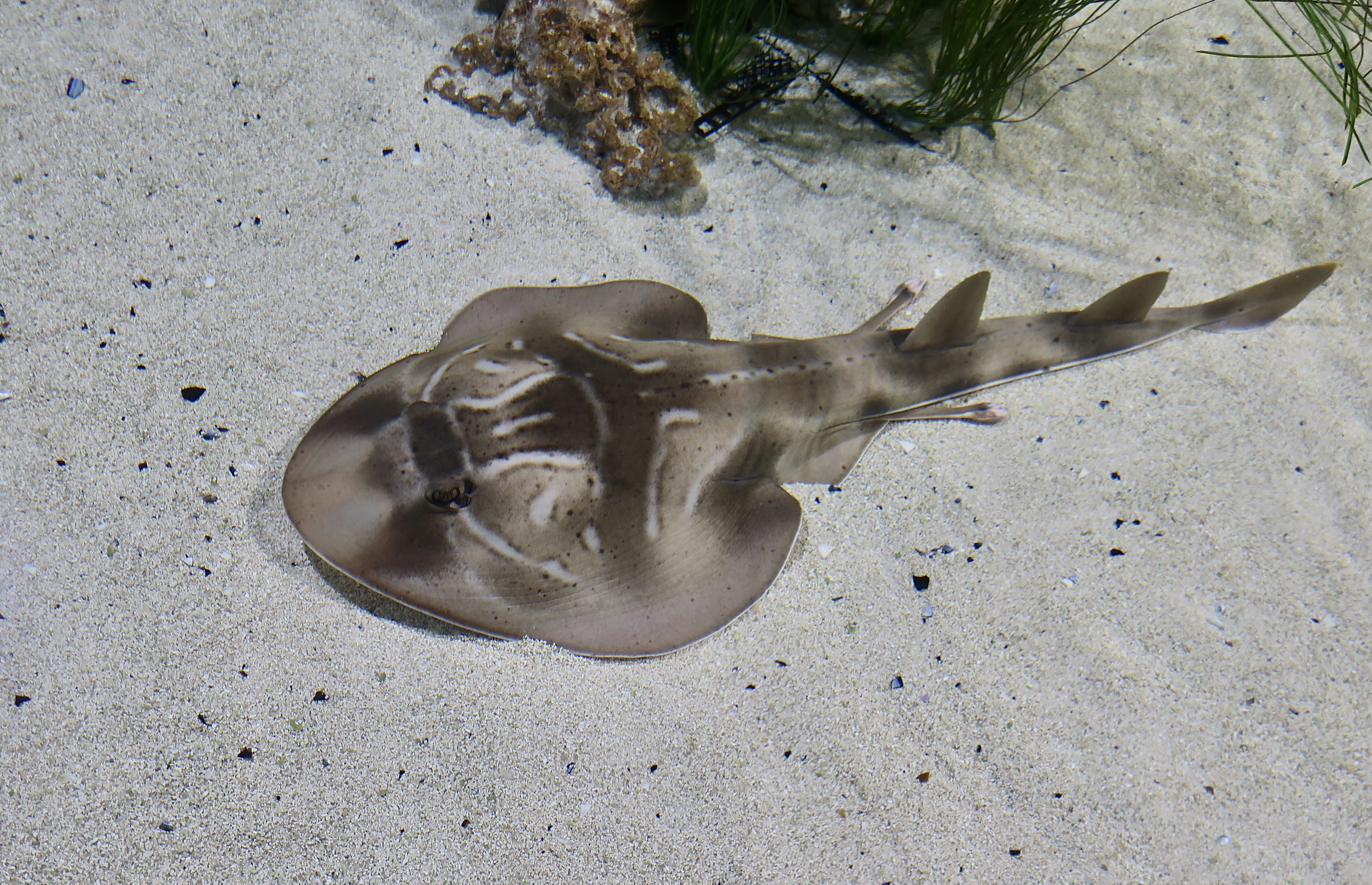
- At OdySea Aquarium.

Conservation status
- Least Concern (IUCN 3.1)

Scientific classification
- Kingdom: Animalia
- Phylum: Chordata
- Class: Chondrichthyes
- Subclass: Elasmobranchii
- Order: Rhinopristiformes
- Family: Trygonorrhinidae
- Genus: Trygonorrhina
- Species: T. dumerilii

Binomial name
- Trygonorrhina dumerilii Castelnau, 1873

= Trygonorrhina dumerilii =

Species of cartilaginous fish

Trygonorrhina dumerilii, the southern fiddler ray, is a species of cartilaginous fish in the Trygonorrhinidae family. The species is medium-sized with mainly yellow, black, and white colours. T. dumerilii has a maximum size of 1 m (3 ft 3 in), and is common in southern Australia and also the eastern parts of the Bass Strait. T. dumerilii is rated least concern on the IUCN Red List.

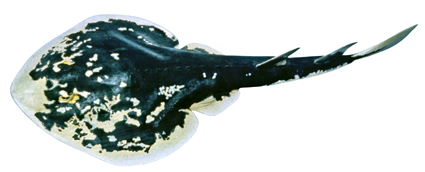
A variant of southern fiddler ray.
