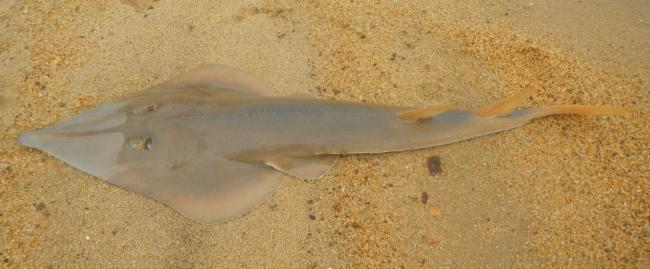

Conservation status
- Least Concern (IUCN 3.1)

Scientific classification
- Kingdom: Animalia
- Phylum: Chordata
- Class: Chondrichthyes
- Subclass: Elasmobranchii
- Order: Rhinopristiformes
- Family: Trygonorrhinidae
- Genus: Aptychotrema
- Species: A. vincentiana

Binomial name
- Aptychotrema vincentiana (Haacke, 1885)

= Southern shovelnose ray =

Species of cartilaginous fish

The southern shovelnose ray, western shovelnose ray, or yellow shovelnose ray (Aptychotrema vincentiana) is a species of fish in the Rhinobatidae family. It is endemic to southern Australia. Its natural habitats are open seas and shallow seas.
