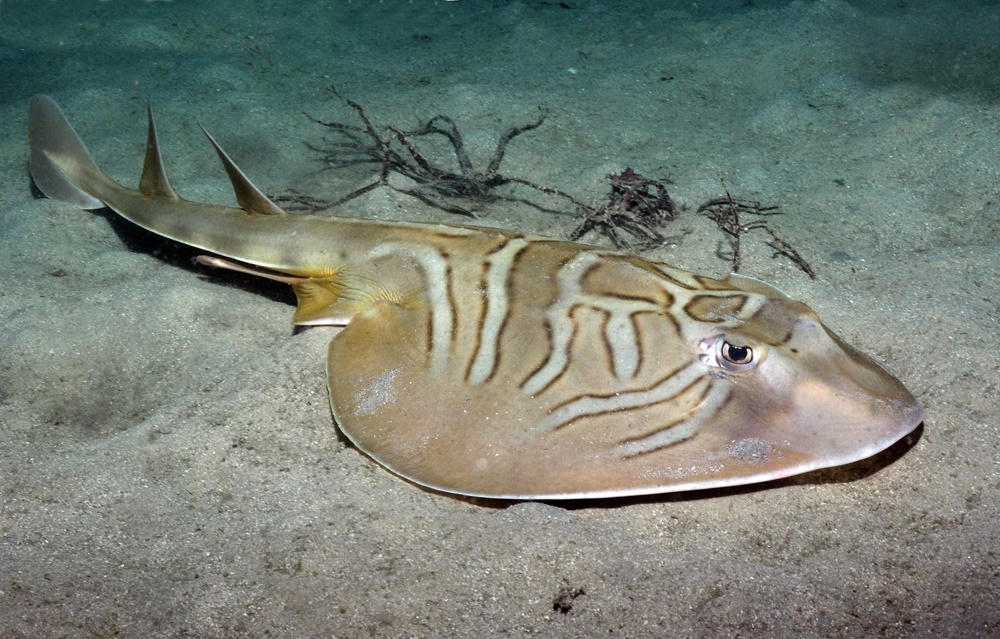
- Eastern fiddler ray (Trygonorrhina fasciata)

Scientific classification
- Kingdom: Animalia
- Phylum: Chordata
- Class: Chondrichthyes
- Subclass: Elasmobranchii
- Order: Rhinopristiformes
- Family: Trygonorrhinidae; Last, Séret & Naylor, 2016

Genera
- Aptychotrema; Trygonorrhina; Zapteryx

= Trygonorrhinidae =

Family of cartilaginous fishes

Trygonorrhinidae, the banjo rays, is a family of rays, comprising eight species in three genera. They were formerly classified in the family Rhinobatidae.

== Taxonomy ==
- Aptychotrema Norman, 1926
  - Aptychotrema rostrata Shaw, 1794 (Eastern shovelnose ray)
  - Aptychotrema timorensis Last, 2004 (Spotted shovelnose ray)
  - Aptychotrema vincentiana Haacke, 1885 (Western shovelnose ray)
- Trygonorrhina J. P. Müller & Henle, 1838
  - Trygonorrhina dumerilii (Castelnau, 1873) (Southern fiddler ray)
  - Trygonorrhina fasciata J. P. Müller & Henle, 1841 (Eastern fiddler ray)
- Zapteryx D. S. Jordan & C. H. Gilbert, 1880
  - Zapteryx brevirostris J. P. Müller & Henle, 1841 (Shortnose guitarfish)
  - Zapteryx exasperata D. S. Jordan & C. H. Gilbert, 1880 (Banded guitarfish)
  - Zapteryx xyster D. S. Jordan & Evermann, 1896 (Southern banded guitarfish)
