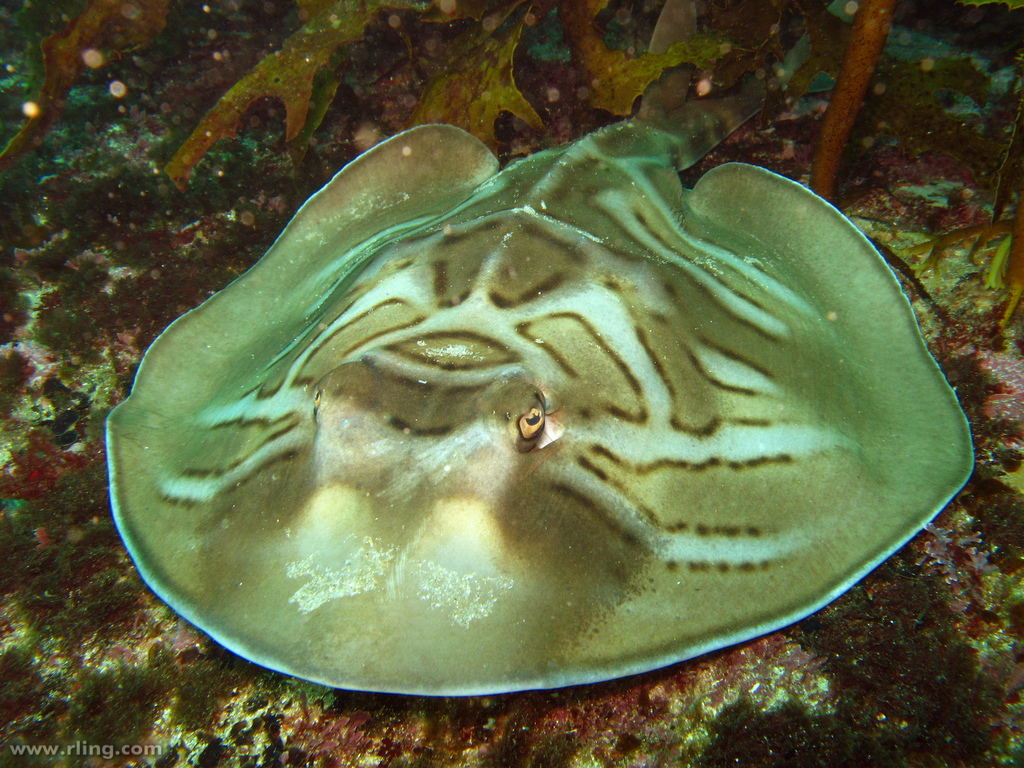

Conservation status
- Least Concern (IUCN 3.1)

Scientific classification
- Kingdom: Animalia
- Phylum: Chordata
- Class: Chondrichthyes
- Subclass: Elasmobranchii
- Order: Rhinopristiformes
- Family: Trygonorrhinidae
- Genus: Trygonorrhina
- Species: T. fasciata

Binomial name
- Trygonorrhina fasciata Müller & Henle, 1841

= Eastern fiddler ray =

Species of cartilaginous fish

The eastern fiddler ray (Trygonorrhina fasciata), also called the banjo shark, fiddler ray, fiddler, green skate, magpie fiddler ray, parrit, southern fiddler ray or southern fiddler, is a species of fish in the Rhinobatidae family. It is endemic to eastern Australia. Its natural habitat is open seas.
