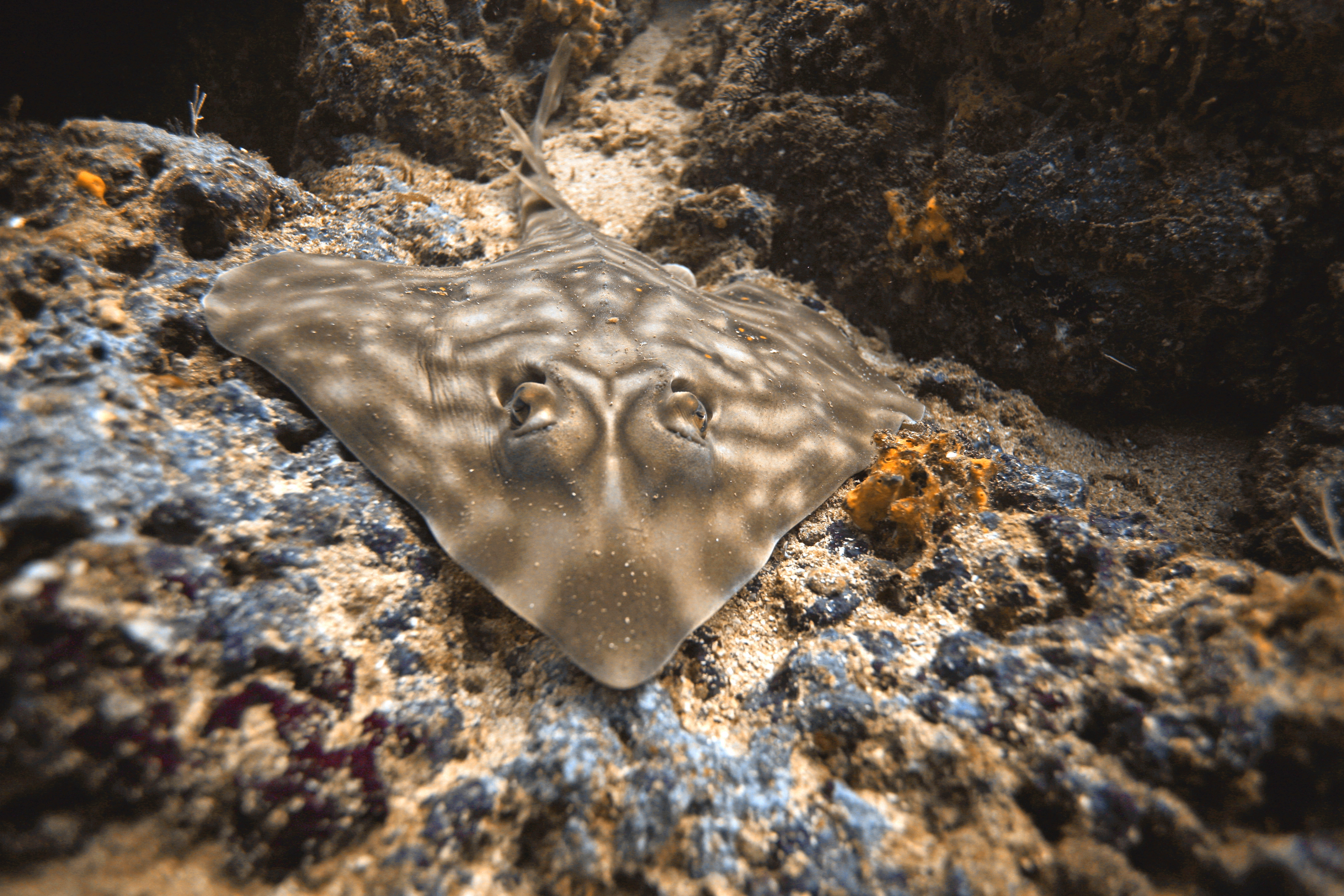

Conservation status
- Vulnerable (IUCN 3.1)

Scientific classification
- Kingdom: Animalia
- Phylum: Chordata
- Class: Chondrichthyes
- Subclass: Elasmobranchii
- Order: Rhinopristiformes
- Family: Trygonorrhinidae
- Genus: Zapteryx
- Species: Z. xyster

Binomial name
- Zapteryx xyster D. S. Jordan & Evermann, 1896

= Southern banded guitarfish =

Species of cartilaginous fish

The southern banded guitarfish (Zapteryx xyster), also known as the witch guitarfish, is a species of fish in the Trygonorrhinidae family found at reefs and other habitats from shallow water to a depth of 150 m in the tropical East Pacific. It ranges from Mazatlan, Mexico, to Colombia, but it likely also occurs off Ecuador and Peru. It is threatened by habitat loss. It is closely related to the more northernly distributed banded guitarfish (Z. exasperata).

== Description ==
As the name implies, southern banded guitarfish possess a flat, depressed body form that is reminiscent of a guitar. Their anatomy resembles other members of the elasmobranch subclass including fused pectoral wings and an asymmetrical caudal fin characteristic of rays and sharks respectively. Individuals are brown or black in color with dark bands formed by many continuous blotches. Both large and small thorns are present throughout the dorsal surface of the body, beginning at the nape and ending at the first dorsal fin.

They may be confused with northern banded guitarfish (Z. exasperata) with which they share many phenotypic and genetic traits. Southern banded guitarfish typically can be differentiated by the presence of a pointed, acute snout and yellow eyespots, or ocelli, across the dorsal bands. These eyespots, while characteristic of Z. xyster, may not be exclusive to the southern lineage, instead resulting from yet-undetermined physiological or environmental pressures. This is supported by the lack of a difference in both the mitochondrial and nuclear genes between Z. xyster and Z. exasperata despite retaining the same physiology. In adults, the ocelli are located at the center and posterior sides of the disc and range in number between 4 and 10. Juveniles and neonates possess 4. The exact age at which this pattern develops has not been identified due to a lack of available data. The visibility of eyespots shifts in males and females during the reproductive season, becoming more and less conspicuous respectively. It is during this time that the sex of an individual can be determined based on ocelli appearance.

== Ecology ==
=== Geographic distribution ===
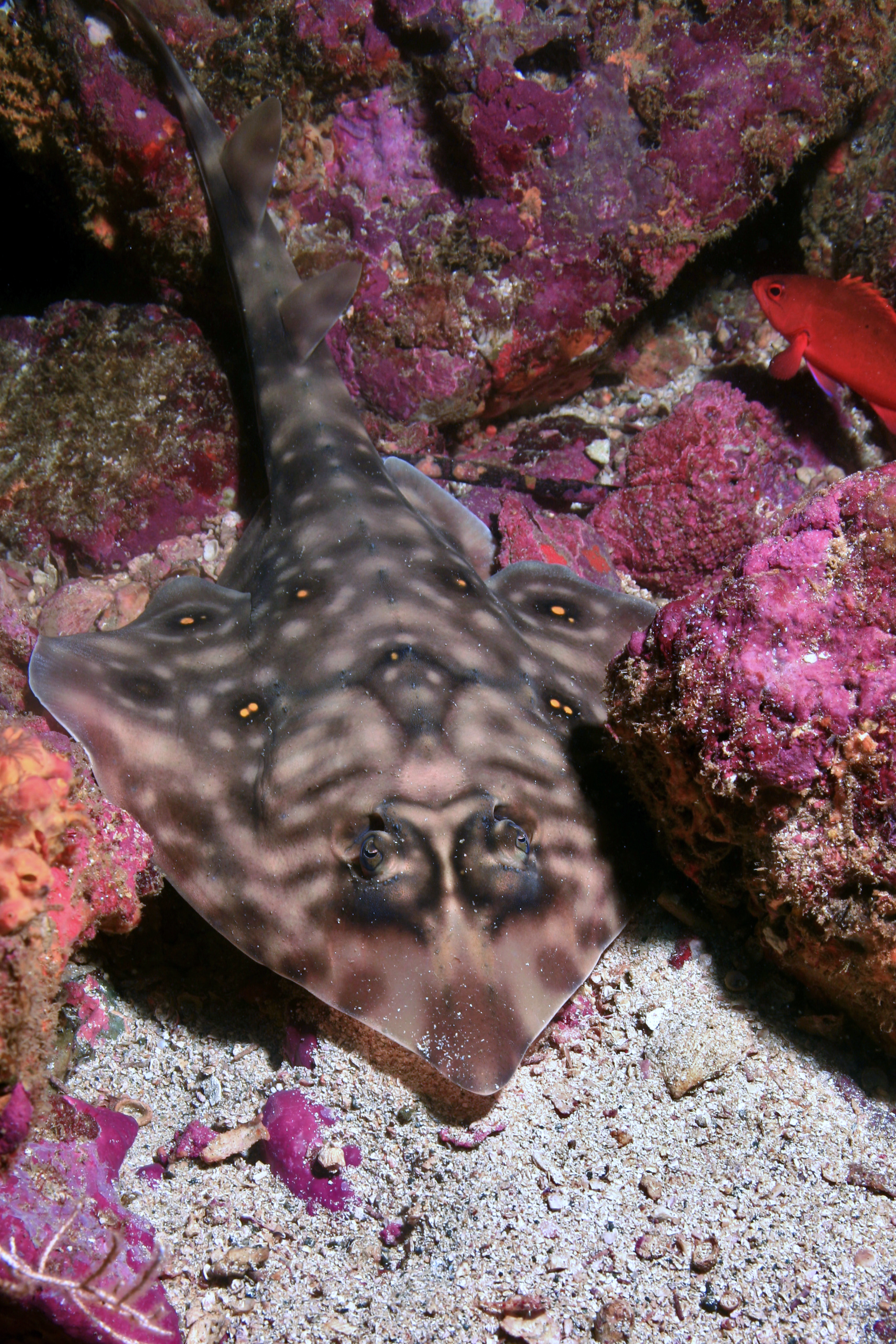
Yellow ocelli on dorsal surface

Southern banded guitarfish are a demersal species that can be found occupying the sandy bottoms of shores and reefs of the warm, tropical waters of the Southeast Pacific beginning near central Mexico and continuing down to Peru. They show some overlap with northern banded guitarfish in regions such as Oaxaca, Mexico, further exacerbating the risk of confusing the two species.

Southern banded guitarfish reside in regions of the continental shelf from 1 to 150 m (492 ft) deep, with most individuals being caught between 20 and 57 m. Age class is a partial determinant of depth distribution, as pregnant females, juveniles, and neonates all occur at slightly different depths. Immature guitarfish typically occupy shallow waters of less than 50 m while adult individuals range from 50 to 150 m.

=== Abundance ===
Southern banded guitarfish are an overall common species whose abundance varies within their native range; however, they show significant overlap with fisheries, particularly those in Mexico, Ecuador, and Costa Rica. In Colombia, they are less prevalent in areas where shrimp-trawling takes place. Over the last 21 years, it is suspected Z. xyster has experienced a 30-49% decrease in population as a result of incidental bycatch.

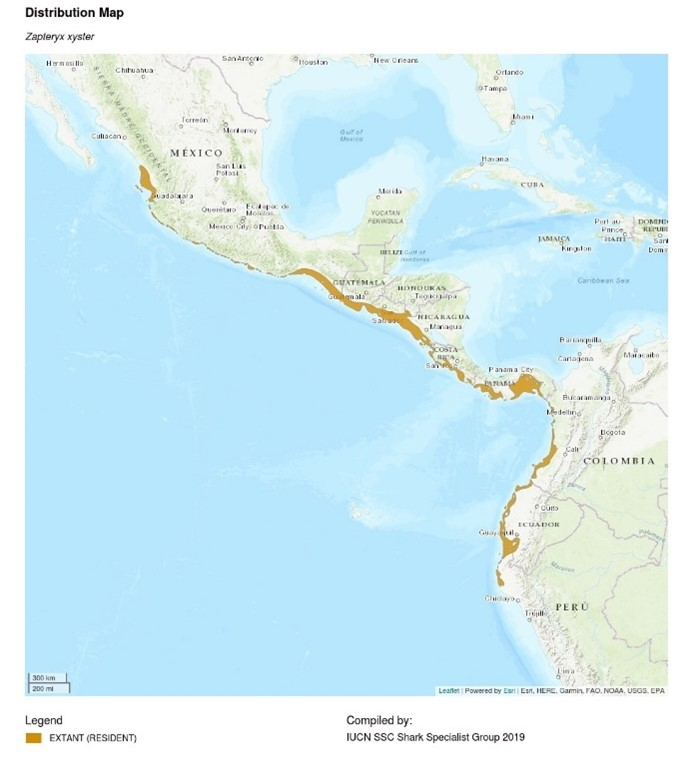
Southern banded guitarfish range

=== Reproduction ===
The reproduction of Z. xyster differs between males and females of the species. Females possess a partially defined annual cycle while males are reproductively capable throughout the year. Mating is thought to peak between June and July to produce offspring that are born during the dry season of December to January, resulting in a gestation period that lasts between 4 and 6 months. Gestation period for Z. xyster, which is shorter than other Zapteryx species, may be hastened by high water temperatures which result in faster overall growth rates and smaller sizes in adulthood. Southern banded guitarfish are viviparous, producing a live litter of up to 6 pups.

=== Life history ===
As elasmobranchs, southern banded guitarfish are a k-selected species, requiring multiple years to achieve sexual maturity and reaching longer lifespans than other species. Maturation typically occurs at a total length (TL) of 47 to 52 cm for females and 42 to 47 cm for males, with pups being born around 18 cm TL. The largest total length recorded for an individual was 78 cm TL. Generation length is approximately 7 years.

Although lifespan has not been studied in southern banded guitarfish, it can be inferred to resemble that of related species, such as Z. exasperata, wherein females and males have average lifespans of 18 and 14 years and reach sexual maturity in 9 and 7 years respectively. The oldest recorded age for a Zapteryx individual was 22 years.

=== Feeding ===
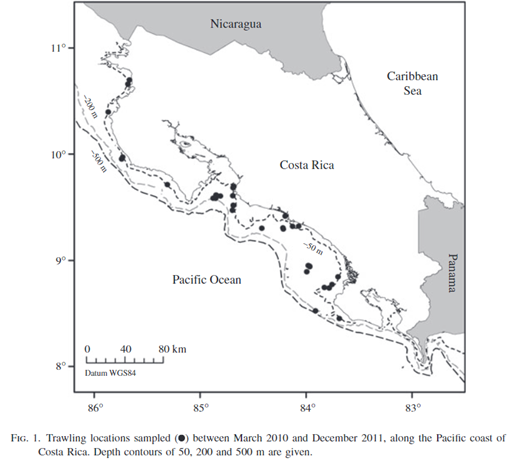
Trawling locations for guitarfish collected for stomach content analysis

Southern banded guitarfish are diet generalists, predating upon various benthic species of teleost fishes, shrimps, and stomatopods through the use of an inferior mouth. Between adults and juveniles, adults consume a higher proportion of larger prey items over invertebrates, indicating a diet change that occurs as individuals mature. Based on the analysis of stomach contents from guitarfish caught via bottom trawling, feeding behavior is highest during the early morning hours until noon, indicating higher overall activity during the day when compared with nighttime, although the opposite has also been shown to be true in the past. The diets of southern banded guitarfish and other Zapteryx species exhibit minimal crossover due to differences in habitat selection, limiting potential competition between the groups.

== Relevance to humans ==
Guitarfish as a family are subjected to human-induced pressures from multiple areas, and southern banded guitarfish are thought to be no exception. Within their range, there is a strong co-occurrence of unmanaged large and small-scale fisheries from which they are caught either intentionally or as bycatch. High economic value is placed on both the fins and meat of guitarfish, to the extent that some species have experienced marked declines in population. They are particularly valuable in regions such as Indonesia and India, with a set of fins for an individual going for up to US$396 kg− ^{1}.

== Conservation ==
Southern banded guitarfish are classified as Vulnerable by the IUCN. Human exploitation has been identified as the greatest threat to the species due to the co-occurrence of unmanaged large and small-scale industrial fisheries within their endemic regions. These fisheries, consisting of trawls, gillnets, or longlines, tend to target high-value demersal prey species such as shrimps.

As resources are depleted due to overexploitation, some Costa Rican fisheries have shifted operations to more shallow waters where they risk coming into increased contact with Z. xyster. Southern banded guitarfish make up 10.9% of total elasmobranch bycatch, with most individuals being those of the juvenile age-class. Because southern banded guitarfish require 7 to 9 years to mature depending on sex, this practice can severely affect population growth and stability.

A formal conservation plan for this species has not yet been established, however targeted elasmobranch and trawl fishing has been banned in portions of their range such as the Peruvian coastline. Additionally, Mexico and Colombia have both instituted temporal regulations for when fisheries can operate, however oversight and enforcement of bycatch limits is minimal. Measures to reduce this high rate of mortality for southern banded guitarfish could begin with stronger management of coastal fisheries, as well as an increase in research focusing on guitarfish distribution spatial ecology so that any deviations in population distribution and abundance are able to be quantified. This is especially integral for those species which have been classified as Vulnerable or Data-deficient such as Z. xyster.
