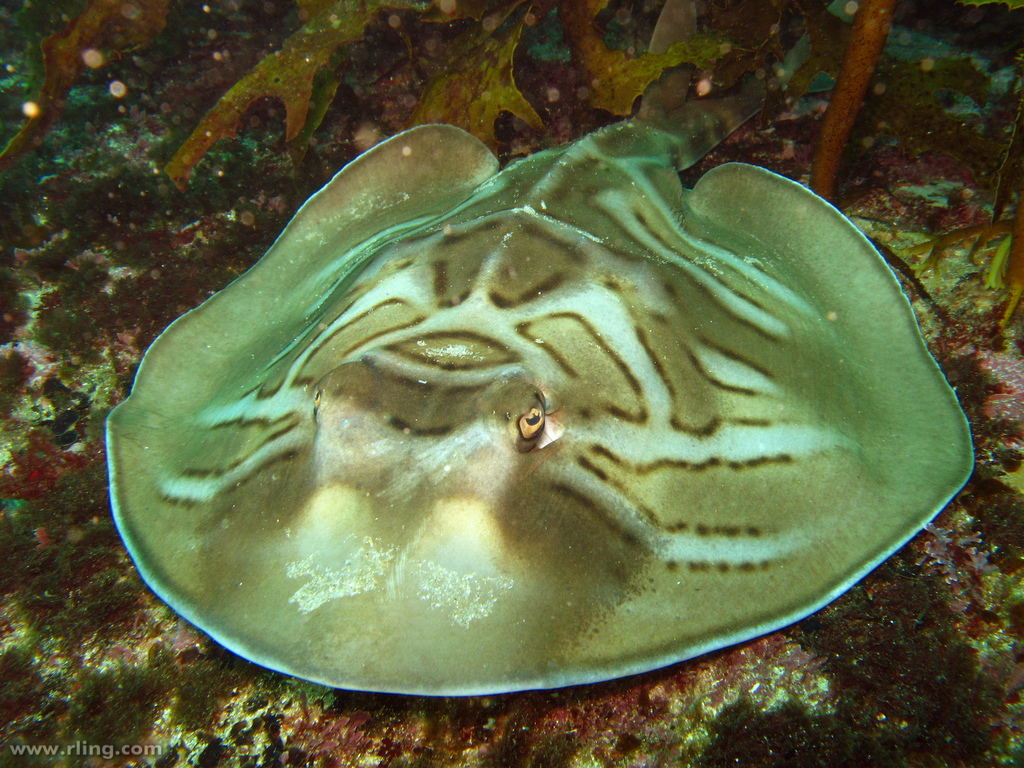
- Trygonorrhina fasciata from Botany Bay

Scientific classification
- Kingdom: Animalia
- Phylum: Chordata
- Class: Chondrichthyes
- Subclass: Elasmobranchii
- Order: Rhinopristiformes
- Family: Trygonorrhinidae
- Genus: Trygonorrhina; J. P. Müller & Henle, 1838

= Fiddler ray =

Fiddler rays

Genus of cartilaginous fishes

Trygonorrhina, also known as the fiddler rays or banjo rays, is a genus of guitarfish, family Rhinobatidae. The two species are found along the eastern and southern coasts of Australia. They are benthic in nature, favoring shallow, sandy bays, rocky reefs, and seagrass beds. The eastern fiddler is found to a length of 120 cm and the southern fiddler to a length of 180 cm.

The flattened pectoral fin discs of fiddler rays are shorter and more rounded than those of other guitarfishes. Their tails are slender, with a well-developed caudal fin and two triangular dorsal fins. Their snouts are translucent. The fiddler rays are also distinguished from other guitarfishes in that the anterior nasal flaps of their nostrils are expanded backwards and fused together into a nasal curtain that reaches the mouth.

Fiddler rays feed on bottoms shellfish, crabs, and worms, which they crush between their jaws. The eastern fiddler ray is known to scavenge from fish traps. Like other guitarfishes, fiddler rays are ovoviviparous. The egg capsules of the southern fiddler ray are reported to be golden in colour, containing three embryos each. It gives birth to litters of four to six young per breeding cycle. Fiddler rays are harmless and easily approached by divers. Southern fiddler rays are taken as bycatch by commercial trawlers and by recreational fishers; the flesh is of good quality and sold in small quantities. The Magpie fiddler ray (previously Trygonorrhina melaleuca) is now considered a variant of Trygonorrhina dumerilii.

== Species ==
There are currently 2 recognized species in this genus:

- Trygonorrhina dumerilii Castelnau, 1873 (Southern fiddler ray)
- Trygonorrhina fasciata J. P. Müller & Henle, 1841 (Eastern fiddler ray)
