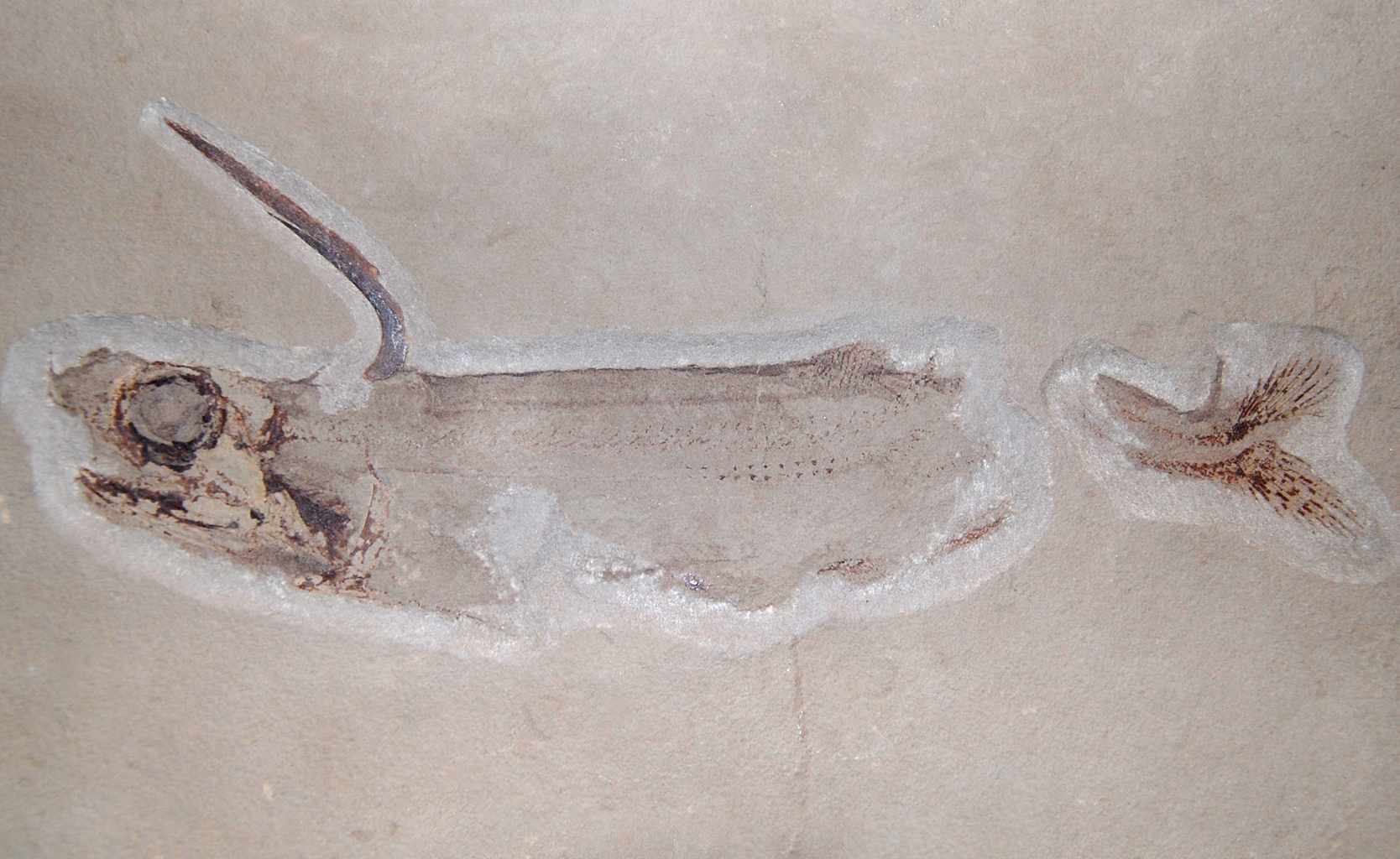
- Specimen in Vienna

Scientific classification
- Kingdom: Animalia
- Phylum: Chordata
- Class: Chondrichthyes
- Order: †Symmoriiformes
- Family: †Falcatidae
- Genus: †Falcatus; Lund, 1985

Species
- Falcatus falcatus

= Falcatus =

Falcatus Temporal range: 335–318 Ma Middle Viséan - Late Serpukhovian

Extinct genus of cartilaginous fishes

Falcatus is an extinct genus of falcatid chondrichthyan which lived during the early Carboniferous Period in Bear Gulch bay in what is now Montana.

== Description ==
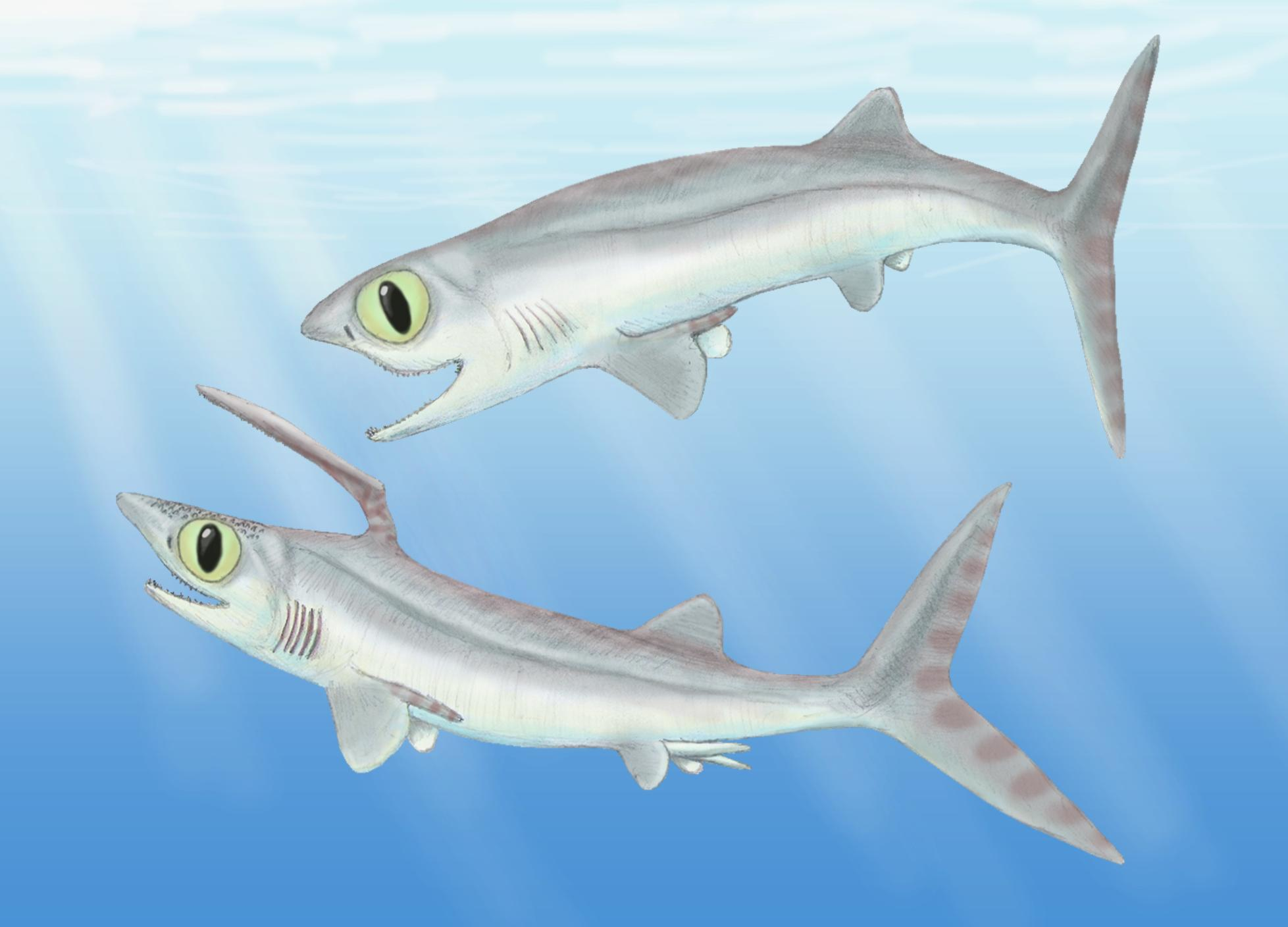
Life restoration of female (top) and male (bottom)

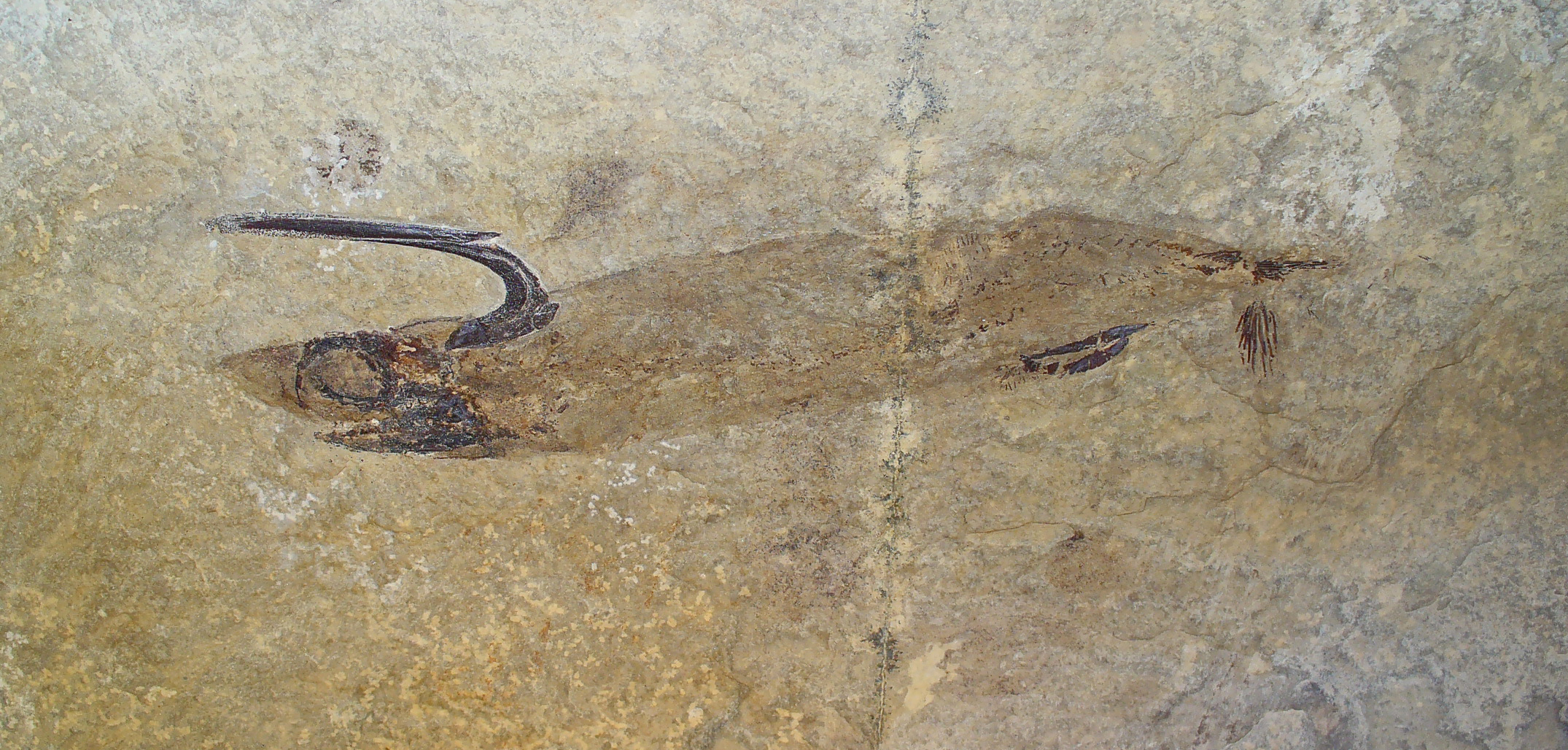
Falcatus falcatus male. Lower Carboniferous, Montana, USA

This fish was quite small, only getting to around 25–30 cm or 10-12 inches long. This is about as big as some of the smallest sharks around today, like the pygmy lanternshark. Falcatus was a chondrichthyan known as a "cladodont-toothed stethacanthid holocephalan". The first material known from the genus were the prominent fin spines that curve anteriorly over the head of the animal. When first described in 1883 from the St. Louis Limestone, these remains were given the name Physonemus falcatus. However, in 1985, fossils of a new type of chondrichthyan from Montana were described that displayed a high degree of sexual dimorphism. The same spines that were previously named P. falcatus were found on one of the morphs, identified as the male due to the presence of valvae.

== Classification ==
Despite often being called a shark, Falcatus and its relatives were part of the order Symmoriiformes, which itself was part of the subclass Holocephali. This means that this fish was more closely related to Chimaeras than to true sharks. Other members of its family include Ozarcus from the Carboniferous of Arkansas, and potentially Cretacladoides from the Cretaceous of Austria.

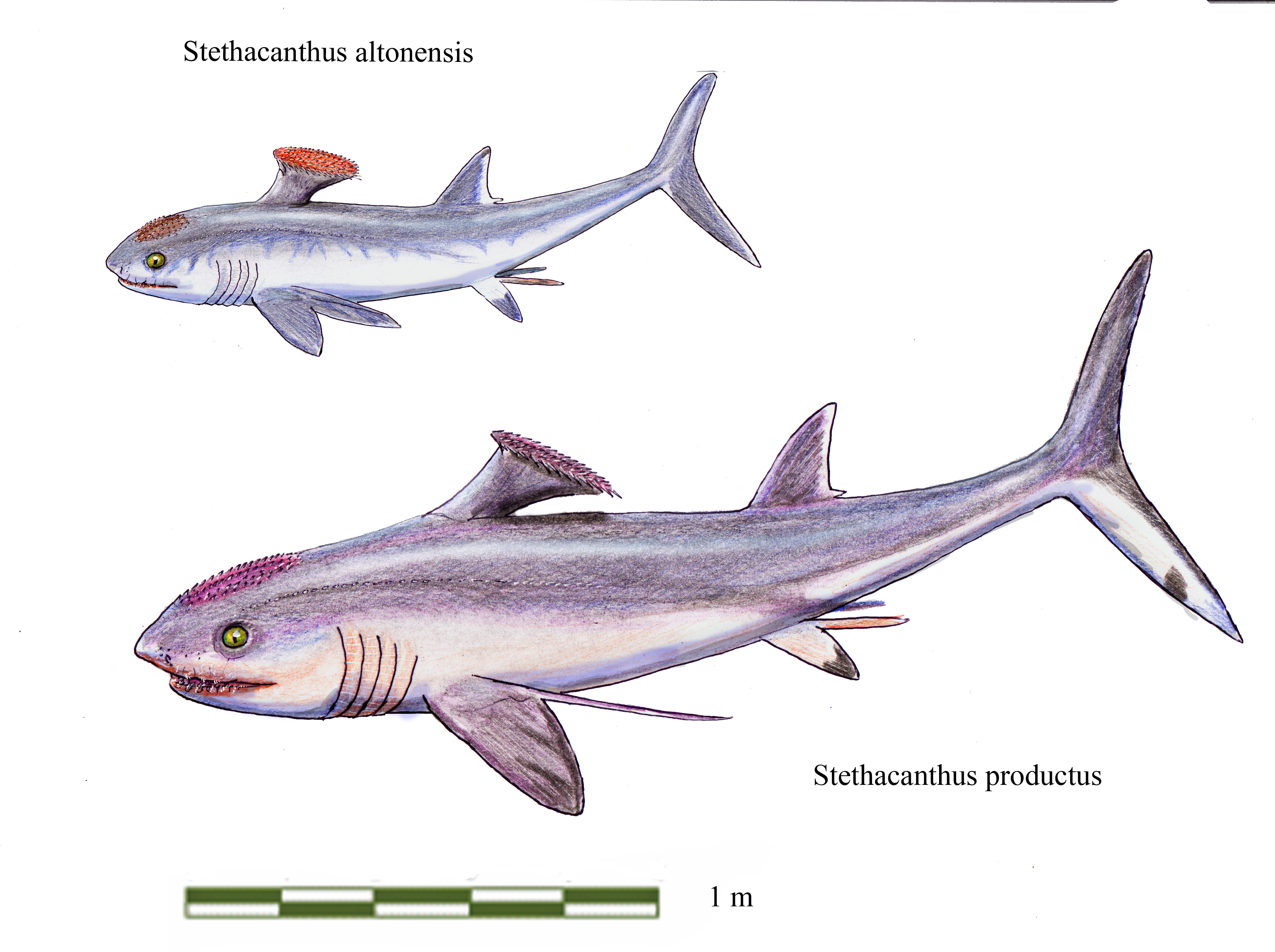
Two Stethacanthus species, S. altonensis and S. productus, lived alongside Falcatus

== Paleoecology ==
The bear gulch limestone is a fossil deposit from the Big Snowy Mountains of Montana. It is a smaller part of the larger St. louis limestone, which dates to the middle carboniferous. During the time, the area was a series of mudflats and lagoons with brackish and freshwater. Many theories have been put forth for the preservation. One is that the creatures sank to the bottom and died of asphyxiation in the oxygen poor waters, being preserved without scavenging took place. Another theory is that the bottom of the bay created mudslides because of heavy rainfall, which rapidly buried the creatures. However, because many of the fish fossils were found with distended gills, this would suggest death by asphyxiation. Falcatus lived alongside many strange creatures like the chondrichthyans Agassizodus, Listracanthus and Delphyodontos. It also lived alongside many ray-finned fish like Discoserra and Paratarrasius. Other fish included the rhabdodermatid Cardiosuctor, the rhizodont Strepsodus, and Hardistiella, one of the oldest known lamprey. The invertebrates of bear gulch were very diverse creatures, like the hoplocarids (relatives of the mantis shrimp), Anderella, which is the youngest known synziphosurine and more enigmatic creatures like the potential gastropod relative Typhloesus, and the "Square objects" which might be sea salps or cnidarians. Other inverts include, mollusks like the nautiloid Tylonautilus, pterioid bivalves which have been found encrusting sargassum like brown algae as well as productid brachiopods, Paleolimulus, phyllocarids and echinoderms like Crinoids, echinoids, sea stars, brittle stars and a many armed starfish called Lepidasterella montanensis.
