= Bear Gulch Limestone =

Paleontological site in Montana, USA

- Stratigraphic range: Late Serpukhovian (Namurian E2b), 324 Ma
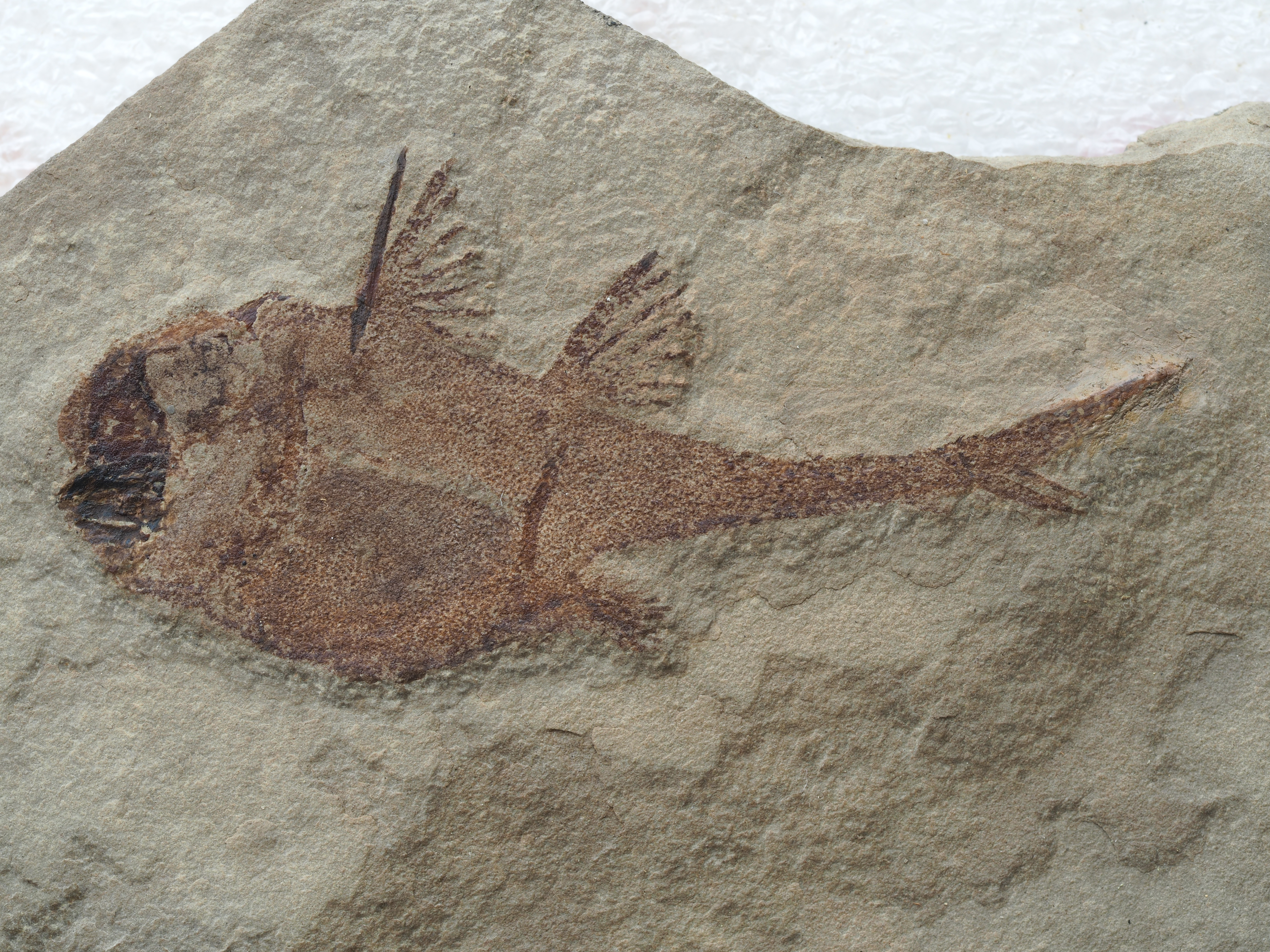
- Echinochimaera meltoni, one of many unusual chondrichthyans found in the Bear Gulch Limestone
- Type: Lens
- Unit of: Heath Formation
- Thickness: 30-40 meters

Lithology
- Primary: limestone, shale
- Other: siltstone

Location
- Coordinates: 46.95°N 109°W
- Country: United States
- Extent: Montana

Type section
- Named for: Bear Gulch, Montana
- Bear Gulch Limestone (Montana)

The Bear Gulch Limestone is a limestone-rich geological lens in central Montana, renowned for the quality of its marine fossils from the late Mississippian subperiod, about 324 million years ago. It is exposed over a number of outcrops northeast of the Big Snowy Mountains, and is often considered a component of the more widespread Heath Formation. The Bear Gulch Limestone reconstructs a diverse, though isolated, marine ecosystem which developed near the end of the Serpukhovian age in the Carboniferous period. It is a lagerstätte, a particular type of rock unit with exceptional fossil preservation of both articulated skeletons and soft tissues. Bear Gulch fossils include a variety of fish, invertebrates, and algae occupying a number of different habitats within a preserved shallow bay.

Fish include a high diversity of unusual chondrichthyans (cartilaginous fish) and one of the oldest known lampreys, along with other vertebrates. Invertebrates include numerous fossils of crustaceans, worms, cephalopods, and sea sponges, which are concentrated in different parts of the bay basin. Shelled cephalopods are abundant, and the Bear Gulch Limestone also preserves some of the best early fossils of coleoid cephalopods. Fossils of typical benthic (seabed-attached) organisms are rare, and those that do occur are restricted to reef-like sponge patches in eastern exposures. This indicates that the conditions of the bay responsible for the Bear Gulch Limestone were at odds with other marine areas nearby.

Some Bear Gulch fossils were preserved so rapidly and efficiently that mating behaviors, internal organs, coloration patterns, gut content, and even the pattern of blood vessels could be observed in fossils. This exceptional preservation may be a consequence of the prevailing warm monsoonal climate, as storms could frequently and rapidly cover the seabed with oxygen-poor organic runoff from shallower areas. Although up to 40 meters of sediment are found in the Bear Gulch Limestone, biostratigraphic data suggests that the lens was emplaced in only 1,000 years, a geological instant.

== Geology ==
=== Geological setting ===
The Bear Gulch Limestone is commonly considered to be part of the Heath Formation, the youngest formation in the Big Snowy Group of central Montana. Some authors instead consider the Bear Gulch Limestone to be an early member of the Tyler Formation, a patchy but widespread unit of Carboniferous limestone and terrestrial sediments. Most of the Heath Formation is represented by black shales and marls, indicative of brackish and salty littoral environments. It developed along a transgressive sequence in a narrow saltwater seaway, known as the Central Montana Trough or Big Snowy Trough. This seaway flowed into the Williston Basin, a shallow inland sea further east. The Central Montana Trough would have also been linked to fully marine basins on the western coastline of Laurussia, but this connection may have been broken by the time of the Bear Gulch Limestone's deposition.

Many distinct limestone lenses (localized sediment packages) are developed in the Heath Formation. They overlap each other in an east-to-west sequence which extends over a distance of 160 km in the Central Montana Trough. The only exposed portions of the sequence are found at Potter Creek Dome, a small uplifted area northeast of the Big Snowy Mountains. The last few limestone lenses form a large portion of the Upper Heath Formation, which is sometimes termed the Bear Gulch Member in recognition of the most well-exposed and fossiliferous lens in the sequence. This lens, the Bear Gulch Limestone, was also one of the last in the sequence, only succeeded by the Surenough Beds immediately west of it. The Bear Gulch Limestone can be observed in numerous outcrops, spread out over an area of more than 50 km2 in Fergus County, Montana.

The creation of limestone lenses in the Heath Formation has been linked to tectonic activity extending the seaway by excavating bays out of the surrounding land. As old bays are filled in and buried by sediment, faulting and seismic events form new bays in a long eastward to westward succession. It may have taken a mere 1000 years for the bay responsible for the Bear Gulch Limestone lens to fill in completely, after only 25,000 years for the entire bay formation sequence to run its course across Montana. The final limestone deposits in the area were succeeded by freshwater lake sediments of the Cameron Creek Formation, the oldest unit of the early Pennsylvanian-age Amsden Group.

=== Age ===
A wide variety of biostratigraphic evidence places the Heath Formation in the upper part of the Chesterian stage, near the end of the Mississippian subperiod (early Carboniferous period). The upper Chesterian is the North American regional equivalent to the global Serpukhovian stage, as well as the lower part of the European Namurian stage. The Bear Gulch Limestone in particular is correlated with ammonoid zone E2b (middle Arnsbergian) of the Namurian, not far from the top of the Serpukhovian. Strata from zone E2b in England and the Czech Republic have been dated to around 324 million years ago.

=== Climate ===
During the time of deposition, the area was about 10-12 degrees north of the equator, on the boundary between the arid subtropics and tropical equatorial region. Cyclical deposition supports a climate model arguing that the overall climate was warm and monsoonal, with pronounced rainy and dry seasons. During the quiet dry season, sedimentation was low and the basin would have been influenced by northeasterly trade winds, tidal currents, and evaporation. Early in the rainy season, warmer temperatures and reduced trade winds would have isolated the basin and increased its overall salinity. As the rainy season progressed, heavy rainfall enhances the bay's horizontal salinity gradient, from the freshwater-influenced upper bay to the marine-influenced lower bay. Storms would also produce a shallow layer of freshwater, washing sediment and organic material from the basin margins down into deeper areas.

=== Sedimentology and ecosystems ===
Fine-grained lithographic limestone (plattenkalk) is predominant in the Bear Gulch lens, though clay to silt-sized siliclastic material also forms a significant portion of rock in some areas. Several facies (sediment associations) are developed in different parts of the bay.

The thick and fossiliferous central basin facies develop along the main northwest-to-southeast axis of the bay, which is delimited by small dewatering microfaults. Well-preserved fish and other nektonic (free-swimming) animals are common, but algae and typical benthic (seabed-living) animals are very rare. Central basin sedimentation was cyclical, with thin beds of pale shale interbedded between thicker layers of dark, organic-rich limestone with a distinct oily smell. Each dark layer contains a sequence of sediments: dense, massive (homogenous) beds followed by laminae with graded bedding, which may be bioturbated in the upper part of the layer. These small sequences, sometimes termed microturbidites, draw comparisons to the Bouma sequences of deep marine turbidite deposits. The pale shale layers of the central basin were likely slowly accumulated during the dry season, while the darker layers correspond to settling bay margin sediments washed into the basin during the rainy season. Sedimentary slumps along the central basin axis have been used to reconstruct flow within the basin, indicating that it deepened and drained to the northeast. The Bear Gulch Limestone reached a thickness of 30 meters at its eastern outlet, and total basin depth was approximately 40 meters.

At its eastern outlet and nearby sheltered alcoves, the central basin transitions into the lightly colored laminated sediments of the Arborispongia-productid facies. They are characterized by reefs and patches of the arborescent (branching) sponge Arborispongia, which is commonly covered with spiny productid brachiopods. Marine benthic organisms, such as algae, bivalves, bryozoans, and crinoids, make up a significant portion of the ecosystem in these few areas. At the calm and shallow northwest rim of the basin, Arborispongia reefs, large stromatolites, and plant debris can be observed. Salt crystal casts are abundant, indicative of hypersalinity and high rates of evaporation in this area. As the bay was filled in by sediments, similar conditions extended into the center of the basin. This results in deposition of the "shallow" or "marly" facies, a collection of very pale micrites with very little organic or siliciclastic material. They preserve various algal laminations, diverse Arborispongia reefs, and local concentrations of chert and gypsum nodules. The end of the bay's lifespan was indicated by a sequence of layers with leaf fragments, limestone conglomerates, marls, and finally fully freshwater sediments.

When the bay was in its heyday, the south edge of the central basin axis saw the development of the filamentous algal facies. These are mostly dark, organic-rich limestones and shales, similar to the central basin facies though with more siliciclastic silt and fewer microturbidites. As the name indicates, strands of filamentous algae are abundant. Further beyond the main basin axis, the rocks are even more silty, not clearly bedded, and have a very dark coloration. These sediments, the marginal facies, have a high content of peloids, plant debris, and other organic material. They likely correspond to shallow, brackish areas with an influx of freshwater. Fossils of fully saltwater taxa are rare and poorly preserved relative to other environments, though organisms with a wider range of salinity tolerance (Acanthodes, gastropods, filamentous algae) are fairly common.

=== Preservation of fossils ===
The Bear Gulch Limestone is a konservat lagerstätte, meaning that its fossils are uniquely well-preserved, including soft tissue details which offer rare insights into the biology of Carboniferous organisms. The fine-grained sediments common in the formation allow for fossilized structures to retain fine resolution, as seen in equivalent plattenkalk-based lagerstätten throughout geological history. Most fossils are isolated and flattened into very thin films between sheet-like layers. Arborispongia assemblages, cephalopod shells, and large vertebrate bones occasionally project through several thin layers, approaching three-dimensional preservation.

Vertebrates typically come in the form of complete skeletons, and their fossils often preserve internal and external organic pigments. Skin pigments can indicate color patterns and the extent of fins and other external structures, while internal pigments are used to outline the liver, spleen, eyes, and other organs. In rare cases, even the structure of fragile blood vessels can be recognized from preserved blood pigments. Uncommon gut contents indicate the diet of some Bear Gulch animals, and phosphatized muscles have been found in very rare situations. Soft invertebrates are indicated by a variety of molds, casts, and organic discolorations on rocks. In the central basin, fossils of invertebrates with calcareous shells are mostly dissolved, leaving only molds in the surrounding rock. On the other hand, invertebrates with chitinous or phosphate-rich shells become more common in the central basin. This may have been a consequence of acidity in the pore fluids of sediments, with less acidic fluids favoring the preservation of calcareous fossils and more acidic fluids favoring phosphatized fossils.

There is some uncertainty over how this exceptional preservation was achieved. Most fossils are complete and undecomposed animals, with no signs of disturbance from scavengers or strong currents. To prevent decomposition of fragile soft tissue in a warm environment, death and burial had to have been very rapid for the vast majority of articulated skeletons. Rare disarticulated fragments may correspond to large or buoyant carcasses which rise to the water surface to gradually decay and fall apart in a "bloat and float" taphonomic process. Fossils are dispersed throughout the Bear Gulch lens, rather than concentrated in specific fossil-rich beds (which would be expected if organisms were killed by algal blooms).

The cyclically deposited seabed of the central basin, though fossiliferous, is deprived of benthic invertebrates. Some authors have suggested that the deepest waters in the basin were too salty or oxygen-poor for most life. However, bottom-dwelling fish are common in the central basin, suggesting that anoxia (low oxygen) was not a persistent quality of bottom waters. Nevertheless, many fish fossils are found with distended gills, favoring asphyxiation as a cause of death. One possible explanation for rapid asphyxiation and burial places blame on freshwater runoff during storms in the wet season. Heavy rainfall would bring a cascade of organic-rich marginal sediments into the central basin. As the sediments sink, they quickly absorb oxygen from the seawater, killing and burying basin organisms in only a matter of hours.

== Paleobiota ==
The ecosystem represented by the Bear Gulch Limestone was vibrant and well-represented by fossils, with many described and undescribed species of vertebrates and invertebrates among their ranks. Animals show a wide range of body types and show preferences to certain areas of the bay, indicating that the bay offered a wide range of habitats and niches to be filled. Many indicators of paleoecology and paleobiology have been preserved, from associations between encrusting shelled organisms and algae, to gut contents and other feeding traces, and even some animals fossilized while mating. Fish are diverse and abundant, with thousands of specimens representing approximately 150 species (as of 2015). Many of these species are undescribed and unnamed, only mentioned through "code names"; unnamed species are not included in paleobiota lists here.

=== Chondrichthyans ===
The Bear Gulch Limestone is renowned for its unusual and ecologically diverse chondrichthyans, the group of cartilaginous fish containing modern sharks, rays, and chimaeras. Over 80 species of chondrichthyans are known (as of 2012), representing close to 60% of the fish diversity (by species count) in the bay. This is a far cry from modern ecosystems, where chondrichthyans comprise only around 3% of fish species. In the Bear Gulch Limestone, chondrichthyans possess a wide range of ecologies and body types, including eel-like forms ("Thrinacoselache"), deep-bodied durophages (petalodontiforms), small active swimmers (most holocephalans), ray-like benthic forms (Squatinactis) and more typical shark-like predators (symmoriiforms and elasmobranchs). Chondrichthyan diversity and abundance patterns are correlated, with the highest number of species and fossils found in the central basin facies and the lowest in the marginal facies. Large predatory chondrichthyans such as Listracanthus and symmoriiforms (except Falcatus) make up a higher portion of fossils in the hypersaline upper bay, while Falcatus and holocephalans are the most common fossils in the marginal and central basin facies. A sheltered reef habitat at the eastern edge of exposures has produced a high number of Heteropetalus fossils. Regardless, each habitat observes significant species overlap with other habitats, and "common" chondrichthyans (>3 specimens) are not abundant to the point that they outnumber more rare species (<3 specimens), in terms of total specimen count. Acanthodes, the only acanthodian known from the Bear Gulch Limestone, has a similar distribution pattern to Strepsodus: common in the upper bay and nowhere else. Lampreys, represented by Hardistiella, are too rare to estimate their habitat preference.

Chondrichthyans of the Bear Gulch Limestone
Taxon	Species	Notes	Images
Acanthodes	A. lundi	An acanthodian	
cf. Agassizodus		A eugeneodont euchondrocephalan	
Bealbonn	B. rogaire	A gregoriid euchondrocephalan	
Belantsea	B. montana	A belantseid petalodontiform euchondrocephalan	
Carcharopsis		A putative euselachian shark	
Cladodus		A "cladodont"	
Cochliodus	C. contortus	A "cochliodont" holocephalan	
Damocles	D. serratus	A large Falcatus-like symoriiform	
Debeerius	D. ellefensi	A debeeriid euchondrocephalan	
Delphyodontos	D. dacriformes	An unusual holocephalan known from sharp-toothed fetuses	
Echinochimaera	E. meltoni	An echinochimaerid holocephalan	
Echinochimaera	E. snyderi	An echinochimaerid holocephalan	
cf. Erismacanthus	E. maccoyanus	A putative "cochliodont"	
Falcatus	F. falcatus	A small and common symoriiform	
Fissodopsis	F. robustus	An obruchevodid petalodontiform	
Gregorius	G. rexi	A gregoriid	
Harpacanthus	H. fimbriatus	A euchondrocephalan with a tentaculated snout	
Harpagofututor	H. volsellorhinus	A long-bodied chondrenchelyiform holocephalan	
Heteropetalus	H. elegantulus	A slender debeeriid	
Janassa	J. clarki	A janassid petalodontiform	
Listracanthus		A spiny-backed chondrichthyan	
Obruchevodus	O. griffithi	An obruchevodid petalodontiform	
Orestiacanthus	O. fergusi	A stethacanthid symoriiform	
Orodus		An orodontiform	
Netsepoye	N. hawesi	An obruchevodid petalodontiform	
Papilionichthys	P. stahlae	An iniopterygian	
Petalorhynchus	P. beargulchensis	A petalorhynchid petalodontiform	
Polyrhizodus	P. digitatus	A petalodontid petalodontiform	
Psephodus		A "cochliodont"	
Rainerichthys	R. zangerli	An iniopterygian	
Siksika	S. ottae	A basal petalodontiform	
Squatinactis	S. montanus	An unusual "cladodont" with broad pectoral fins, reminiscent of modern rays or angelsharks (Squatina)	
Srianta	S. dawsoni	A gregoriid	
Srianta	S. iarlis	A gregoriid	
Srianta	S. srianta	A gregoriid	
Stethacanthus	S. altonensis	A stethacanthid	
Stethacanthus	S. productus	A stethacanthid	
Thrinacodus	T. gracia	An eel-like thrinacodontid elasmobranch, sometimes given its own genus, "Thrinacoselache"	
Traquairius	T. agkistrocephalus	A "cochliodont"	
Traquairius	T. nudus	A "cochliodont"	
Traquairius	T. spinosus	A "cochliodont"	
Tristychius		A tristychiid elasmobranch	
Venustodus	V. argutus	A broad-toothed euchondrocephalan	

=== Actinopterygians ===
Actinopterygians (ray-finned bony fish) are also quite diverse, with about 50 described and undescribed species (as of 2012) making up more than a third of the Bear Gulch fish diversity. In terms of specimen count, they are the most abundant fish fossils in the Bear Gulch Limestone, representing approximately 80% of all fossil vertebrates. However, they are more restricted than chondrichthyans in terms of ecomorphology. Most have a small and generalized fusiform (smoothly tapering) body shape, with only a few deviations towards more elongated or deep-bodied forms. The most abundant actinopterygians include Wendyichthys and three closely related unnamed species (code names "Yogo", "Fub", and "Cop"). The relative abundance of actinopterygians drops off in the upper bay, though they are still fairly common. Schools of freshly hatched larvae have been found in isolated reef habitats near the central basin.

Ray-finned fish of the Bear Gulch Limestone
Taxon	Species	Notes	Images
Aesopichthys	A. erinaceus	An aesopichthyid "palaeoniscoid"	
Apholidotus	A. ossuous	A unique eel-like apholiform	
Beagiascus	B. pulcherrimus	A "palaeoniscoid"	
Cyranorhis	C. bergeraci	A rhadinychthyid "palaeoniscoid"	
Discoserra	D. pectinodon	A guildayichthyiform	
Guildayichthys	G. carnegiei	A guildayichthyiform	
Kalops	K. diophrys	A "palaeoniscoid"	
Kalops	K. monophrys	A "palaeoniscoid"	
Lineagruan	L. judithi	A "palaeoniscoid"	
Lineagruan	L. snowyi	A "palaeoniscoid"	
Paphosiscus	P. circulocaudus	A paphosisciform "palaeoniscoid"	
Paphosiscus	P. scalmocristus	A paphosisciform	
Paratarrasius	P. hibbardi	A tarrasiiform	
Proceramala	P. montanensis	An aesopichthyid	
Wendyichthys	W. dicksoni	A rhadinychthyid	
Wendyichthys	W. lautreci	A rhadinychthyid	

=== Other fish ===
Non-actinopterygian and non-chondrichthyan fish make up a fairly small component of the overall diversity, though their fossils are still common in some habitats. Preserved sarcopterygians (lobe-finned fish) include actinistians (coelacanths) and the rhizodont Strepsodus, which have very different habitat preferences. Coelacanths, particularly fossils of the genus Caridosuctor, are abundant in the central basin and its margins, but are practically absent in the upper bay. Strepsodus, on the other hand, is moderately common in the upper bay and very rare elsewhere. Neither are common in the sheltered eastern reef habitat.

Fish of the Bear Gulch Limestone
Taxon	Species	Notes	Images
Allenypterus	A. montanus	An unusual hadronectorid actinistian (early coelacanth)	a
Caridosuctor	C. populosum	A rhabdodermatid actinistian	
Hadronector	H. donbairdi	A hadronectorid	
Hardistiella	H. montanensis	One of the oldest known petromyzontiforms (lampreys)	
Lochmocercus	L. aciculodontus	An indeterminate actinistian	
Polyosteorhynchus	P. beargulchensis	A hadronectorid	
Strepsodus		A rhizodont	

=== Arthropods ===
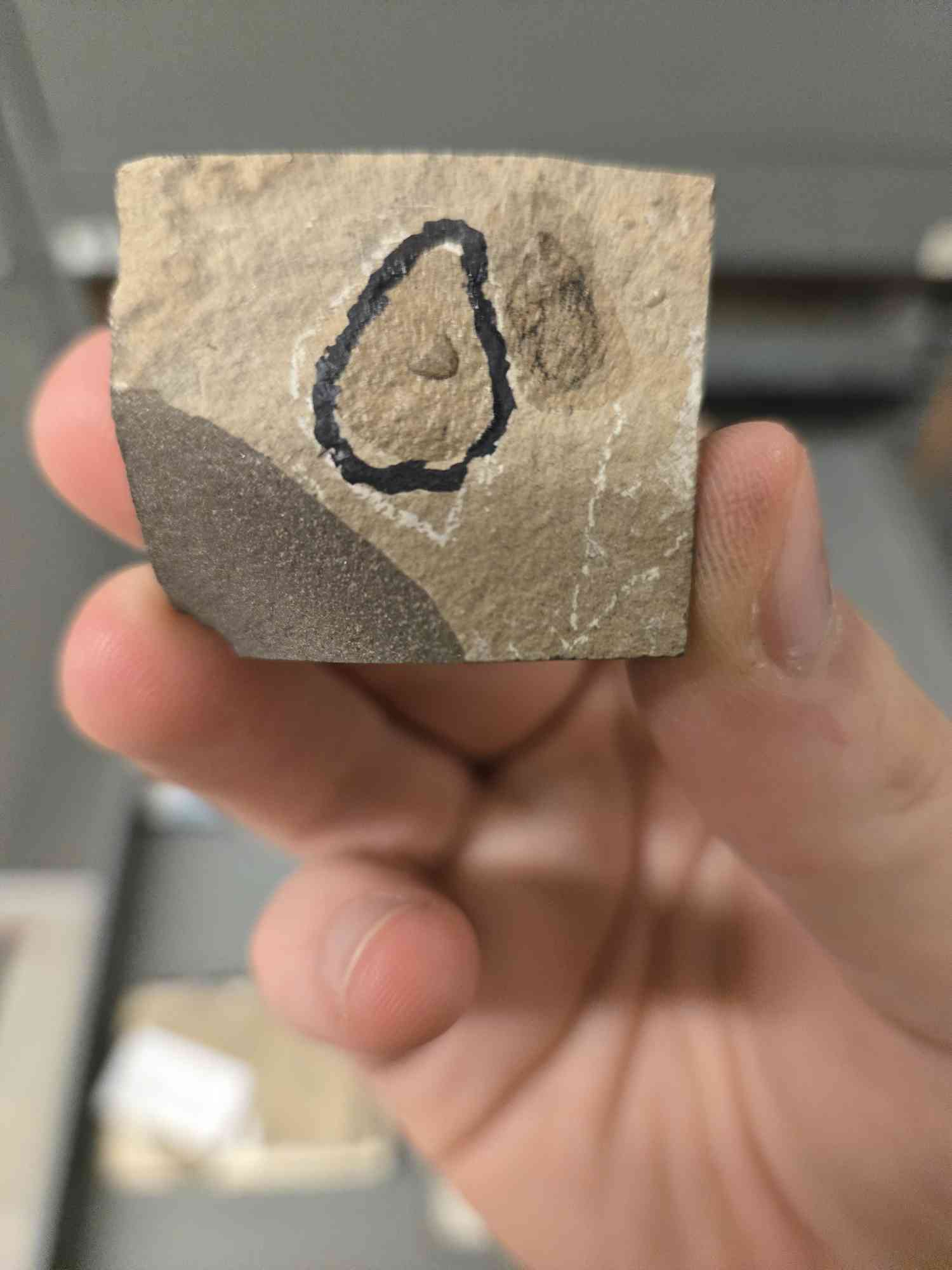
The only known trilobite from the Bear Gulch Limestone, an isolated Pygidium.

Arthropods are diverse, the most abundant and speciose being various early hoplocarids, relatives of modern stomatopods (mantis shrimps). Other arthropods include an assortment of typical Carboniferous crustaceans, rare xiphosurans (horseshoe crabs), and a single "synziphosurine" (Anderella). Trilobites, though common in adjacent formations, are practically absent in the Bear Gulch Limestone.

Arthropods of the Bear Gulch Limestone
Genus	Species	Notes	Images
Aenigmacaris	A. cornigerum	An aeschronectid hoplocarid	
Anderella	A. parva	The youngest known "synziphosurine" ( a group of xiphosuran-like chelicerates)	
Bairdops	B. beargulchensis	A possibly paraphyletic "palaeostomatopod" (primitive hoplocarid), often considered a relative of Perimecturus, and at one point a junior synonym of Tyrannophontes	
Belotelson	B. magister	A belotelsonid shrimp	
Concavicarida indet.		An indeterminate concavicarid, possibly referable to Ankitokazocaris or Concavicaris	
Crangopsis	C. eskdalensis	A rare aeschronectid hoplocarid	
Daidal	D. acanthocercus	An "archaeostomatopod" (hoplocarid closely related to modern mantis shrimps), previously referred to Tyrannophontes theridion and sometimes considered its own species of Tyrannophontes.	
Dithyrocaris	D. rolfei	A large phyllocarid shrimp	
Euproops	E. sp.	A rare xiphosuran (early horseshoe crab)	
Ostracoda indet.		Indeterminate and very rare ostracods	
"Paleolimulus"	"P". longispinus	A xiphosuran with uncertain classification	
"Perimecturus"	"P." rapax	A possibly polyphyletic "palaeostomatopod" (primitive hoplocarid), often considered a relative of Bairdops	
Sairocaris	S. centurion	A probable phyllocarid shrimp	
Schramine	S. montanaensis	One of the oldest of the crab-like cycloid crustaceans, previously considered a species of Halicyne	
Titanoprosoma	T. edgecombei	A simplified arthropod tentatively identified as a euchelicerate.	

=== Molluscs ===
Molluscs of the Bear Gulch Limestone
Taxon	Species	Notes	Images
Bivalvia sp.		Several unnamed or undescribed species of bivalves, including scallop-like (Aviculopecten?) and mussel-like (Myalina?) forms. Some encrusting pterioid bivalves (Caneyella, Ptychopteria) have been found attached to strands of sargassum-like brown algae.	Reticycloceras sp.
Cephalopoda sp.		Various cephalopods, which are locally abundant in the Bear Gulch Limestone. They include coiled nautiloids (Anthracoceras, Epistroboceras, Tylonautilus), orthoconic (straight-shelled) nautiloids (Reticycloceras), ammonoids (Fayettevillea, Eumorphoceras, Metadimorphoceras), and coleoids (Gordoniconus, etc.). The possible vampyropod Syllipsimopodi has also been described from the area, though it may be a juvenile Gordoniconus.	Reticycloceras sp.
Gastropoda sp.		Unnamed or undescribed species of gastropods (sea snails), which are only common in marginal facies Typhloesus may also be a specialized gastropod.	Reticycloceras sp.

=== Worms ===
"Nemavermes mackeei" is a worm-shaped fossil originally known from the Mazon Creek fossil beds of Illinois, and later reported from Bear Gulch. Initially described as a free-swimming nematode, a 2023 reinvestigation indicated that the holotype of Nemavermes mackeei from Mazon Creek is actually a detached proboscis of Tullimonstrum. Other "Nemavermes" fossils from Mazon Creek are actually lamprey-like cyclostome fish, named as the new genus and species Squirmarius testai. The true identities of the Bear Gulch "Nemavermes" fossils are ambiguous.

Worms of the Bear Gulch Limestone
Genus	Species	Notes	Images
Archisymplectes	A. rhothon	A nemertine (ribbon worm)	
Astreptoscolex	A. anasillosus	A nephtyid polychaete worm	
Brochosogenys	B. reidiae	A kielanoprionid polychaete	
Carbosesostris	C. megaliphagon	A goniadid polychaete	
Deuteronectanebos	D. papillorum	An indeterminate worm	
Phiops	P. aciculorum	A lumbrinerid polychaete	
Ramesses	R. magnus	An indeterminate polychaete	
Soris	S. labiosus	An indeterminate polychaete	
Symmetroprion	S. sp.	A symmetroprionid polychaete	

=== Other invertebrates ===
Invertebrates of the Bear Gulch Limestone
Genus / Taxon	Species	Notes	Images
Brachiopoda sp.		Several unnamed or undescribed species of brachiopods, including productids, spiriferids, Orbiculoidea, and Lingula. Small and large spiny productids are common encrusters on other organisms.	An unnamed sea urchin Lepidasterella montanensis Typhloesus wellsi
Bryozoa sp.		Very rare and undescribed encrusting bryozoans, including Pycnopora regularis and Discretella robusta.	An unnamed sea urchin Lepidasterella montanensis Typhloesus wellsi
Conodonta sp.		Various conodonts, only recovered from coprolites or gut content of Typhloesus. May include Lochriea, Kladognathus, Gnathodus, and Cavusgnathus.	An unnamed sea urchin Lepidasterella montanensis Typhloesus wellsi
Echinodermata sp.		Various rare echinoderms, including unnamed or undescribed species of crinoids, echinoids (sea urchins), ophiuroids (brittle stars), and asteroids (sea stars). The only moderately common echinoderm is Lepidasterella montanensis, a many-armed sea star.	An unnamed sea urchin Lepidasterella montanensis Typhloesus wellsi
Paraconularia	P. subulata	A conulariid	An unnamed sea urchin Lepidasterella montanensis Typhloesus wellsi
Porifera sp.		Various rare to locally abundant sea sponges, including hexactinellids (Teganiella, Ursaspongia, Norfordia) and Belemnospongia. By far the most abundant is Arborispongia delicatula, a ramose (branching) sponge which serves as the foundation for complex reef-like ecosystems.	An unnamed sea urchin Lepidasterella montanensis Typhloesus wellsi
Sphenothallus		A common but enigmatic organism with a strand-like tubular shape, possibly represented by multiple species. May be related to cnidarians or conulariids.	An unnamed sea urchin Lepidasterella montanensis Typhloesus wellsi
"Square objects"		Very common but enigmatic barrel-shaped planktonic organisms, possibly salps or cnidarians	An unnamed sea urchin Lepidasterella montanensis Typhloesus wellsi
Typhloesus	T. wellsi	An unusual swimming invertebrate originally mistaken for large conodonts ("Lochriea wellsi", "Scottognathus elizabethi") with complex jaws. Conodont elements are now understood to be gut content. Often interpreted as a deuterostome, but recently reinterpreted as a heteropod-like gastropod.	An unnamed sea urchin Lepidasterella montanensis Typhloesus wellsi

== See also ==
- List of types of limestone
