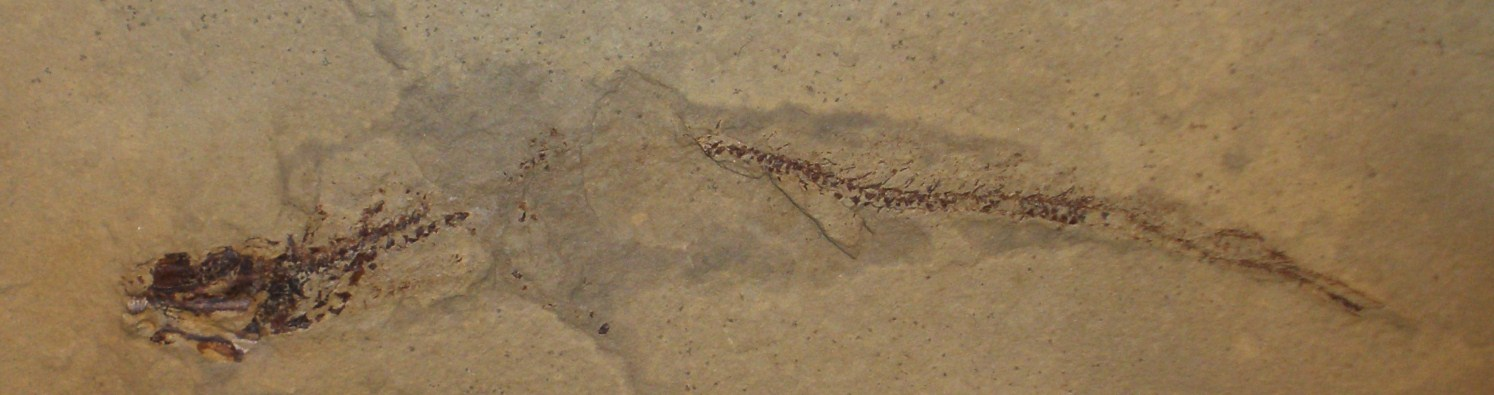
- Complete skeleton of a female H. volsellorhinus from the Bear Gulch Limestone

Scientific classification
- Kingdom: Animalia
- Phylum: Chordata
- Class: Chondrichthyes
- Subclass: Holocephali
- Order: †Chondrenchelyiformes
- Family: †Chondrenchelyidae
- Genus: †Harpagofututor; Lund, 1982

Type species
- Harpagofututor volsellorhinus Lund, 1982

= Harpagofututor =

Harpagofututor Temporal range: Mississippian 324–318 Ma

Extinct genus of cartilaginous fishes

Harpagofututor is an extinct genus of eel-like cartilaginous fish from the Early Carboniferous (Mississippian). It is primarily known from complete specimens discovered in the Bear Gulch Limestone of Montana, as well as an isolated tooth from Whitrope, Scotland.

== Discovery and taxonomy ==
Harpagofututor was first described in 1982, from several complete specimens discovered in the Bear Gulch Limestone of Montana by Adelphi University palaeontologist Richard Lund. There is only one named species, H. volsellorhinus, which was described by Lund in 1982. A single specimen of indeterminate species is also known from a single tooth plate discovered in Whitrope, Scotland. The genus is placed in the family Chondrenchelyidae, which are suggested to be members of Holocephali, with their closest living relatives being chimaeras.

== Description ==
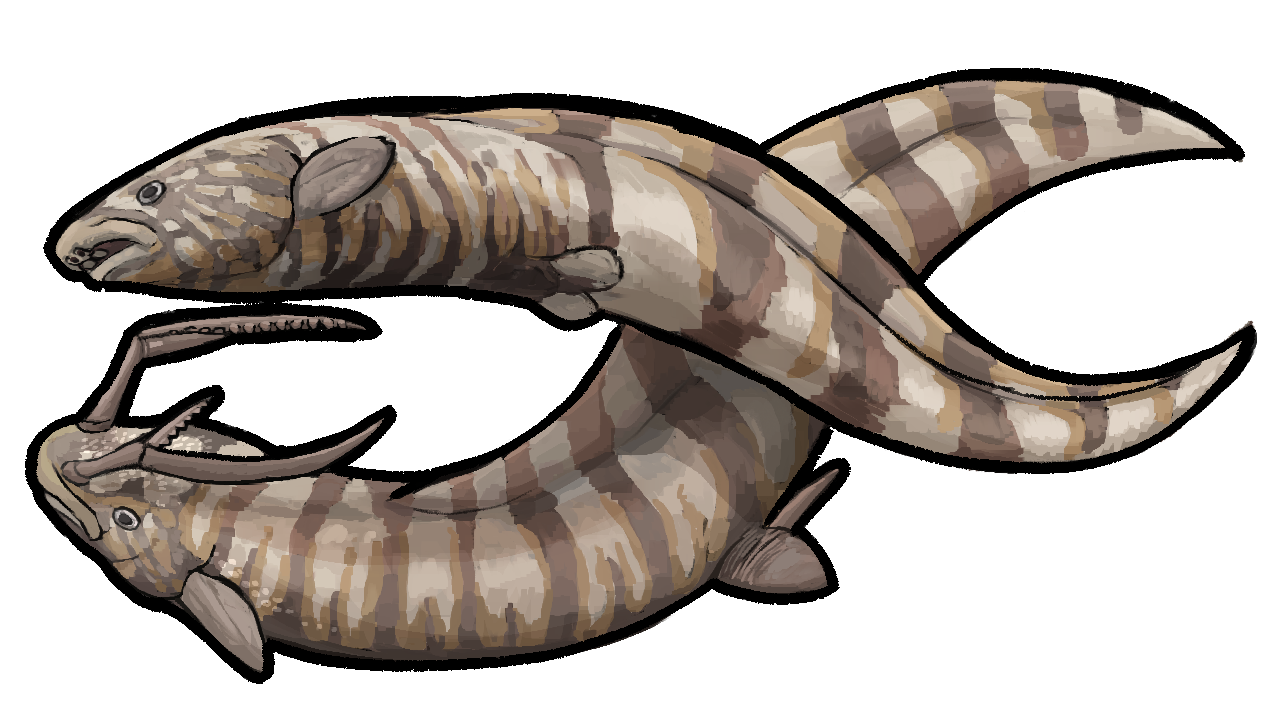
Life reconstruction of a male (below) and female (above) of H. volsellorhinus. The male displays sexually dimorphic claspers on the head and pelvic fins.

Like the other only well known member of Chondrenchelyidae, Chondrenchelys, Harpagofututor had a long, elongate eel-like body (with known specimens ranging in length from 8.6 to 17 centimetres (3.4 to 6.7 in)) with a long upper medial fin running along the upper surface of the body without a fin spine. The skull tapered towards the front end, becoming very narrow near its apex. The mouth has pairs of tooth plates in the upper and lower jaws, comparable to those of living chimaeras, which were triangular in shape. The tooth plates when unworn have a ridged texture, with the ridges being separated by small knobs. The heads of males had unusual paired forked hollow structures growing from the top of the head, known as ethmoid or cephalic claspers, formed from 3 rods, one basal rod (which is partially calcified) attached to the skull to which two other rods (which were covered in denticles) articulated, with the structures apparently being able to rotate on a ball-and socket joint where they joined the skull. They are thought to have been used during mating. These structures, which are considerably longer than the skull itself, are apparently unique to Harpagofututor and not found in Chondrenchelys.

== Ecology ==
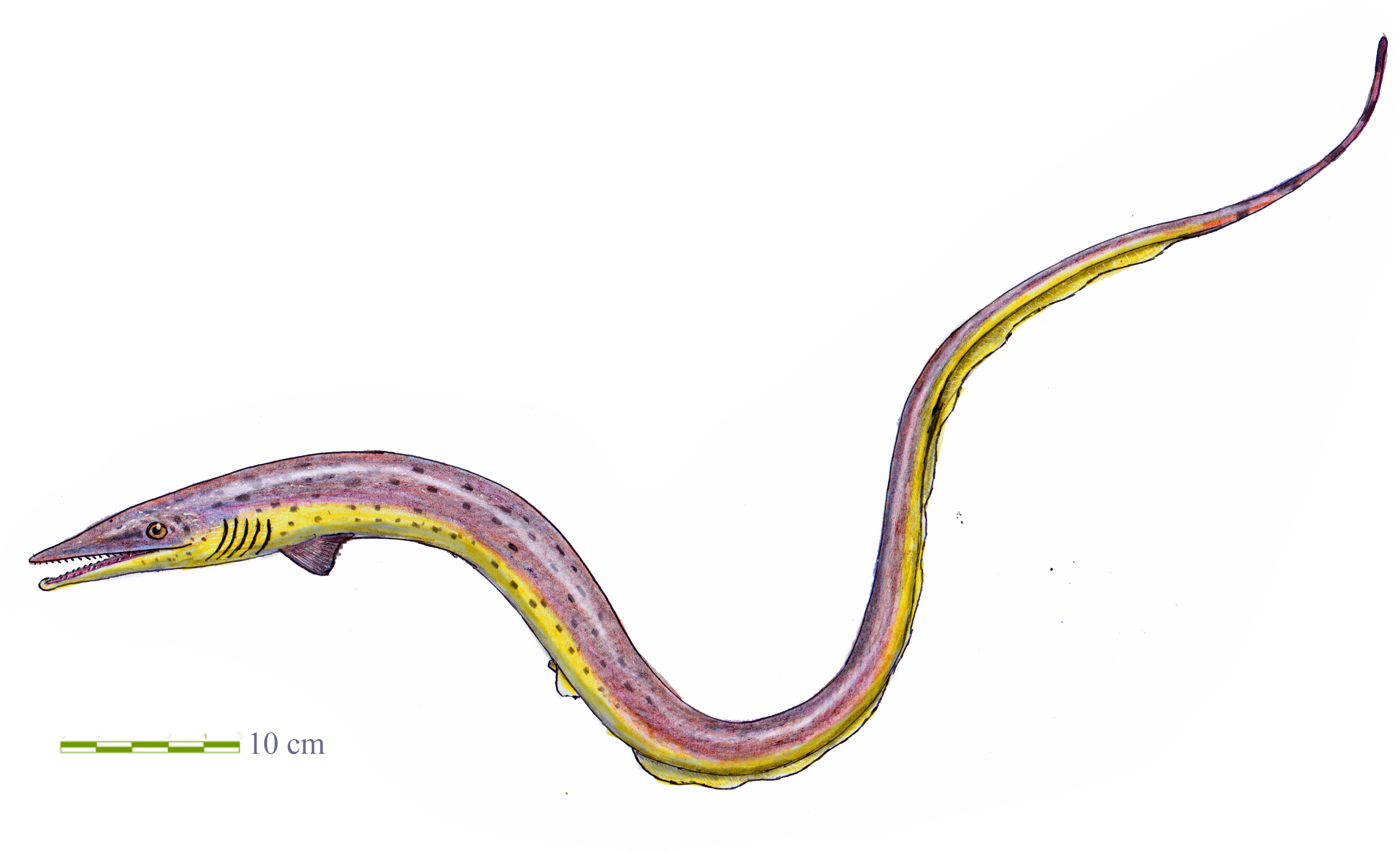
Thrinacodus (sometimes classified as Thrinacoselache) is a known predator of Harpagofututor.

The tooth plates of Harpagofututor are thought to have been used to crush prey. Harpagofututor is suggested to have given live birth, with newborn juveniles being proportionally large and morphologically nearly identical to adults. Finds as stomach contents suggest that Harpagofututor was preyed upon by the eel-like elasmobranch Thrinacodus.

== Sources ==
- Aquagenesis: The Origin and Evolution of Life in the Sea by Richard Ellis
- The Rise of Fishes: 500 Million Years of Evolution by John A. Long
