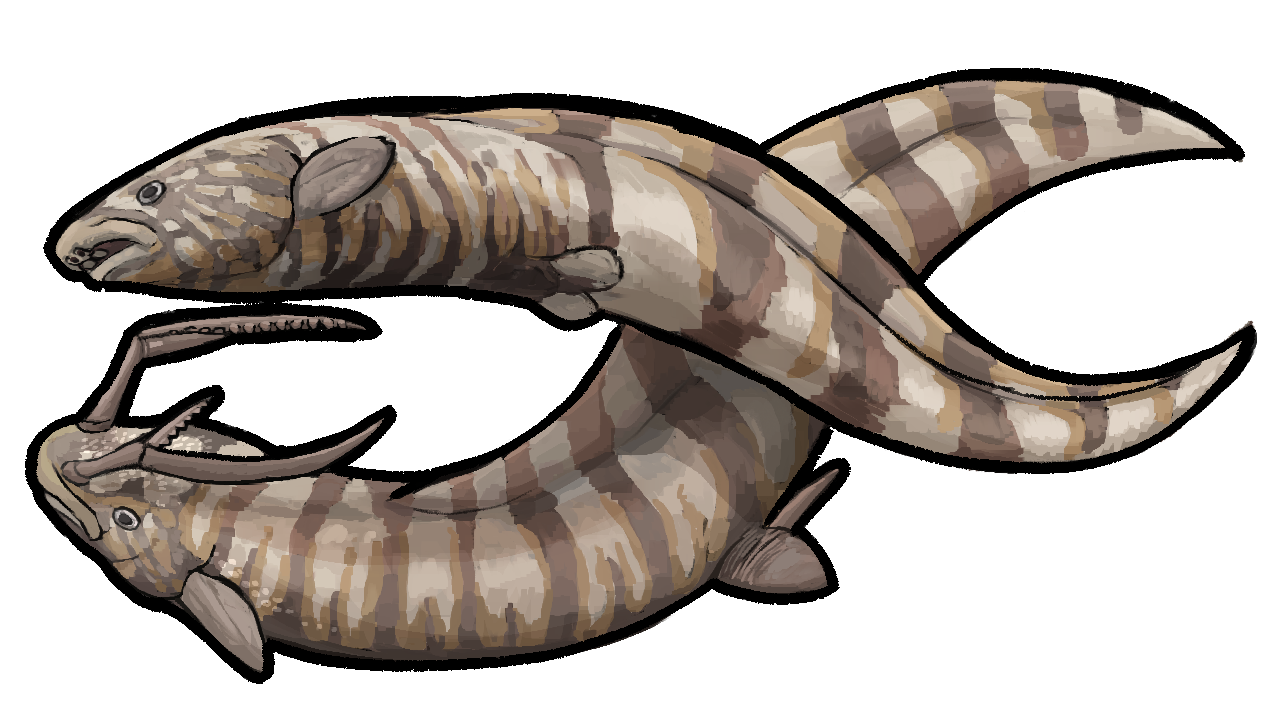
- Life restoration of Harpagofututor volsellorhinus, including male (below) and female
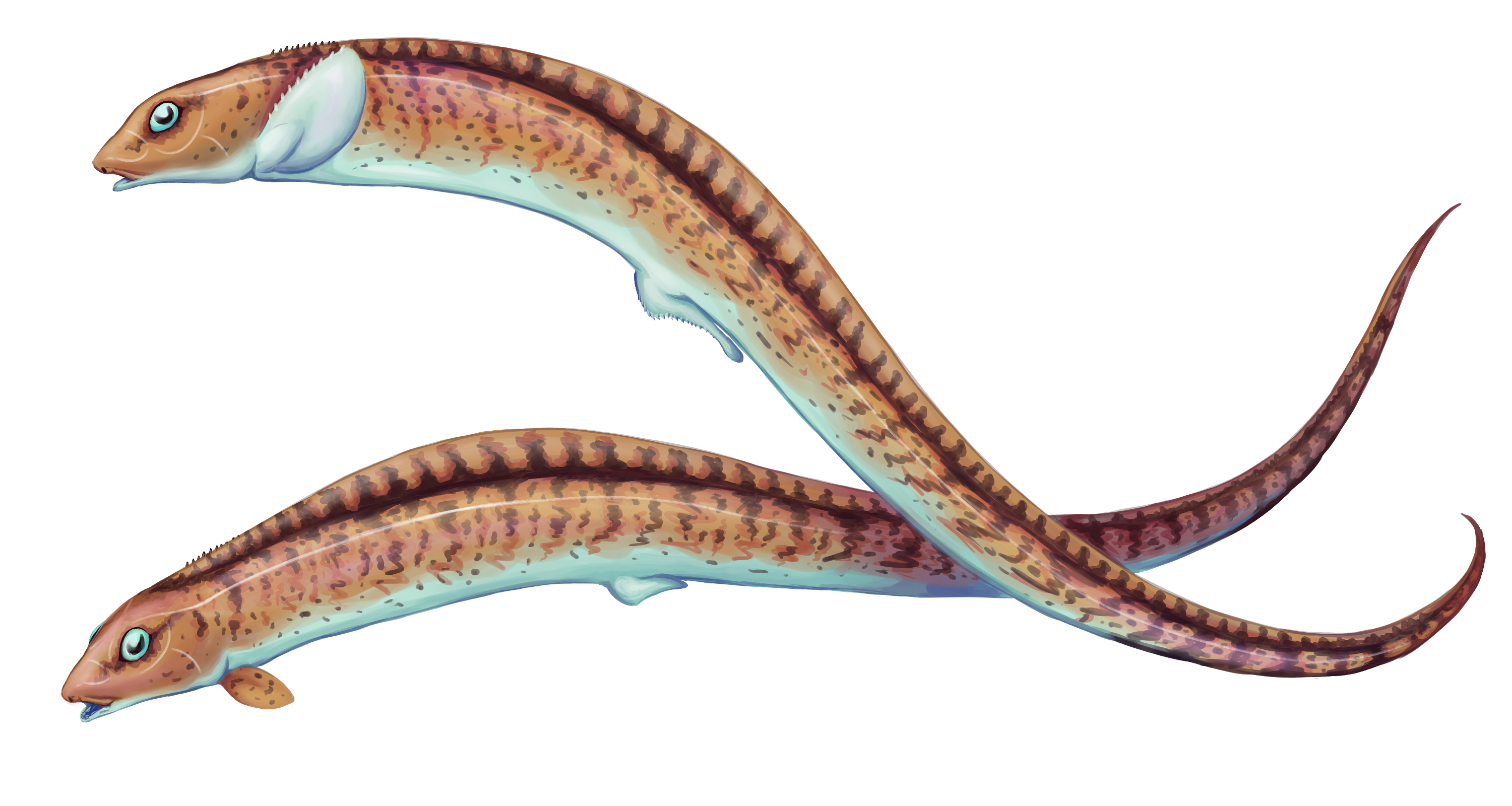
- Life restoration of Chondrenchelys problematica, including male (above) and female

Scientific classification
- Kingdom: Animalia
- Phylum: Chordata
- Class: Chondrichthyes
- Subclass: Holocephali
- Order: †Chondrenchelyiformes; Patterson, 1965
- Family: †Chondrenchelyidae; Berg, 1940

Genera
- Chondrenchelys; Harpagofututor; Platyxystrodus

= Chondrenchelyiformes =

Chondrenchelyiformes Temporal range: Mississippian

Extinct family of holocephalan cartilaginous fish

Chondrenchelyiformes is an extinct order of holocephalan cartilaginous fish, with a single family, Chondrenchelyidae, known from the Early Carboniferous of Europe and North America. There are currently two recognised genera known from largely complete remains, Chondrenchelys from the Visean of Scotland, and Harpagofututor from the Serpukhovian aged Bear Gulch Limestone of Montana, United States. Both genera have elongate, eel-like bodies, with their mouths having tooth plates similar to those of living chimaeras, to which they share numerous anatomical similarities indicating a close relationship. Isolated tooth plates assigned to the genus Platyxystrodus likely belong to members of the family, which would extend the range of the group into the late Carboniferous.

== Anatomy ==
Chondrenchelyiformes generally have elongate bodies with tapered heads, the lower jaw (mandible) is elongate, and articulates with the quadrate bone of the skull below the posteior edge of the eye socket. The dentition is composed of tooth plates, including paired plates in the upper and lower jaws (with the posterior tooth plates being larger than those further forward), and an unpaired symphyseal plate at the front of the lower jaw. There is a long fin running along the upper body surface known as the median fin (which notably lacks a fin spine). The left and right halves of the pectoral girdle are not fused to each other. The pectoral fins are smaller in females in males, the pelvic clasper of the male is elongate, and their metapterygia are robust.
