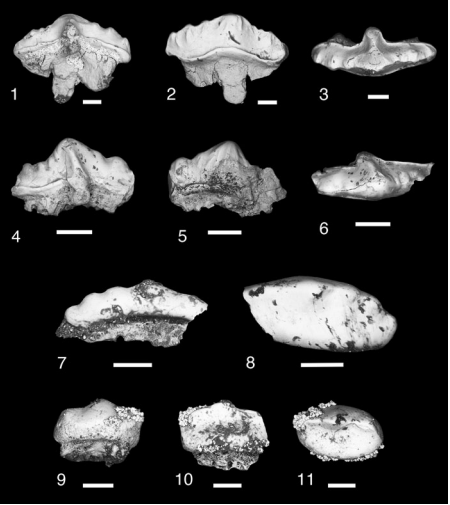
- Srianta cf. S. srianta from the Surprise Canyon formation

Scientific classification
- Kingdom: Animalia
- Phylum: Chordata
- Class: Chondrichthyes
- Subclass: †Euchondrocephali
- Family: †Gregoriidae; Lund and Grogan 2004

Genera
- Gregorius; Srianta; Bealbonn

= Gregoriidae =

Gregoriidae Temporal range: Serpukhovian

Extinct family of cartilaginous fishes

Gregoriidae is an extinct family of early chondrichthyans from the Carboniferous period. It currently includes three described genera: Gregorius, Srianta, and Bealbonn. This family includes remains formerly ascribed to the genus Desmiodus, which is now considered a nomen vanum or nomen dubium. The relationships between the included genera are not entirely clear. Fossils are known from Serpukhovian-aged formations including the Bear Gulch Limestone and Surprise Canyon Formation.
