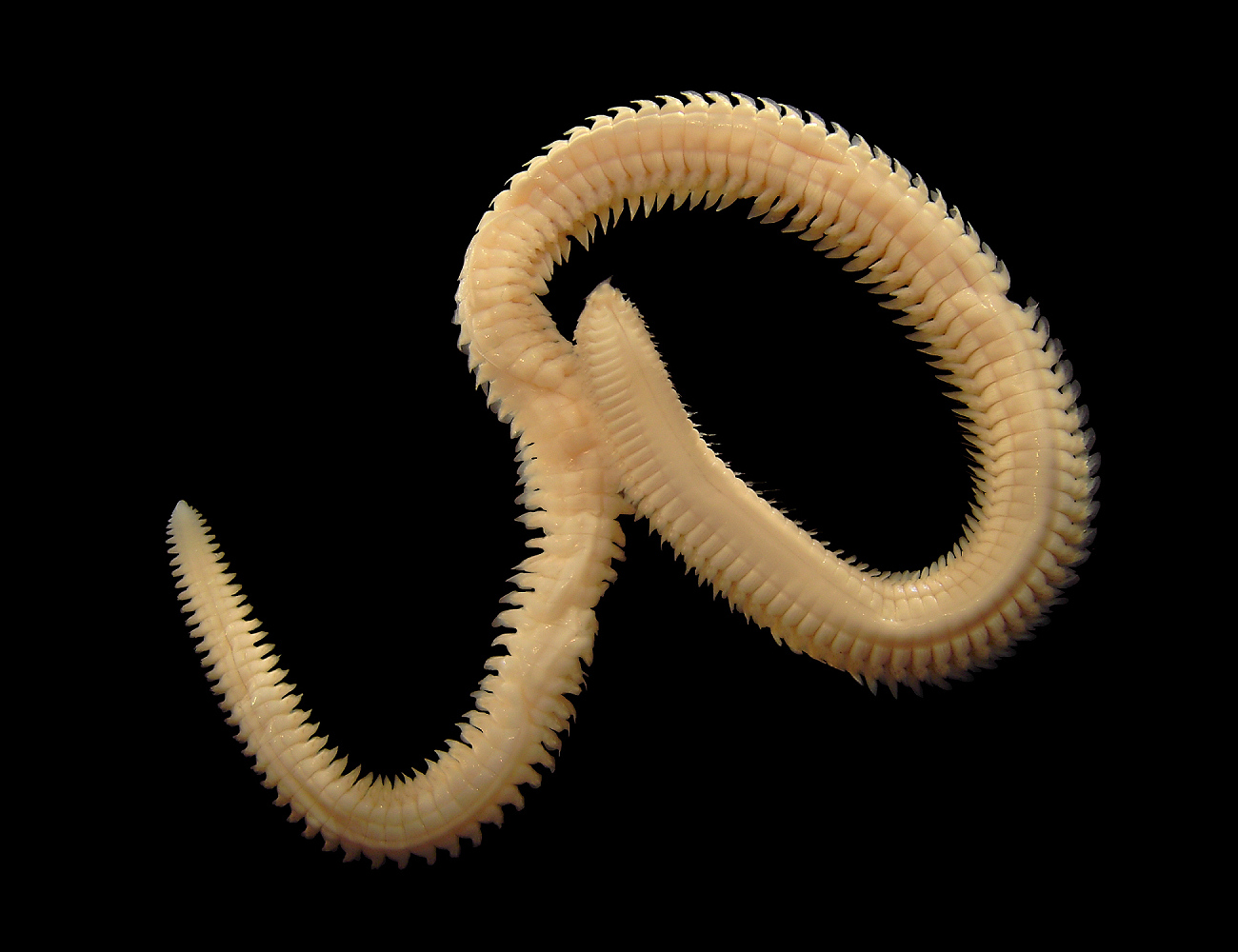
- Nephtys hombergii

Scientific classification
- Kingdom: Animalia
- Phylum: Annelida
- Clade: Pleistoannelida
- Subclass: Errantia
- Order: Phyllodocida
- Family: Nephtyidae
- Genus: Nephtys; Cuvier, 1817

Type species
- Nephtys ciliata

Synonyms
- List: Aonis Savigny, 1822; Dentinephtys Imajima & Takeda, 1987; Diplobranchus Quatrefages, 1866; Nephthys Cuvier, 1817; Nereis (Nephtys) Cuvier, 1817; Portelia Quatrefages, 1850

= Nephtys =

Genus of annelids

Nephtys is a genus of marine catworms. Some species are halotolerant to a degree in that they can survive in estuaries and estuarine lagoons down to a salinity of 20 psu (Practical Salinity Units).

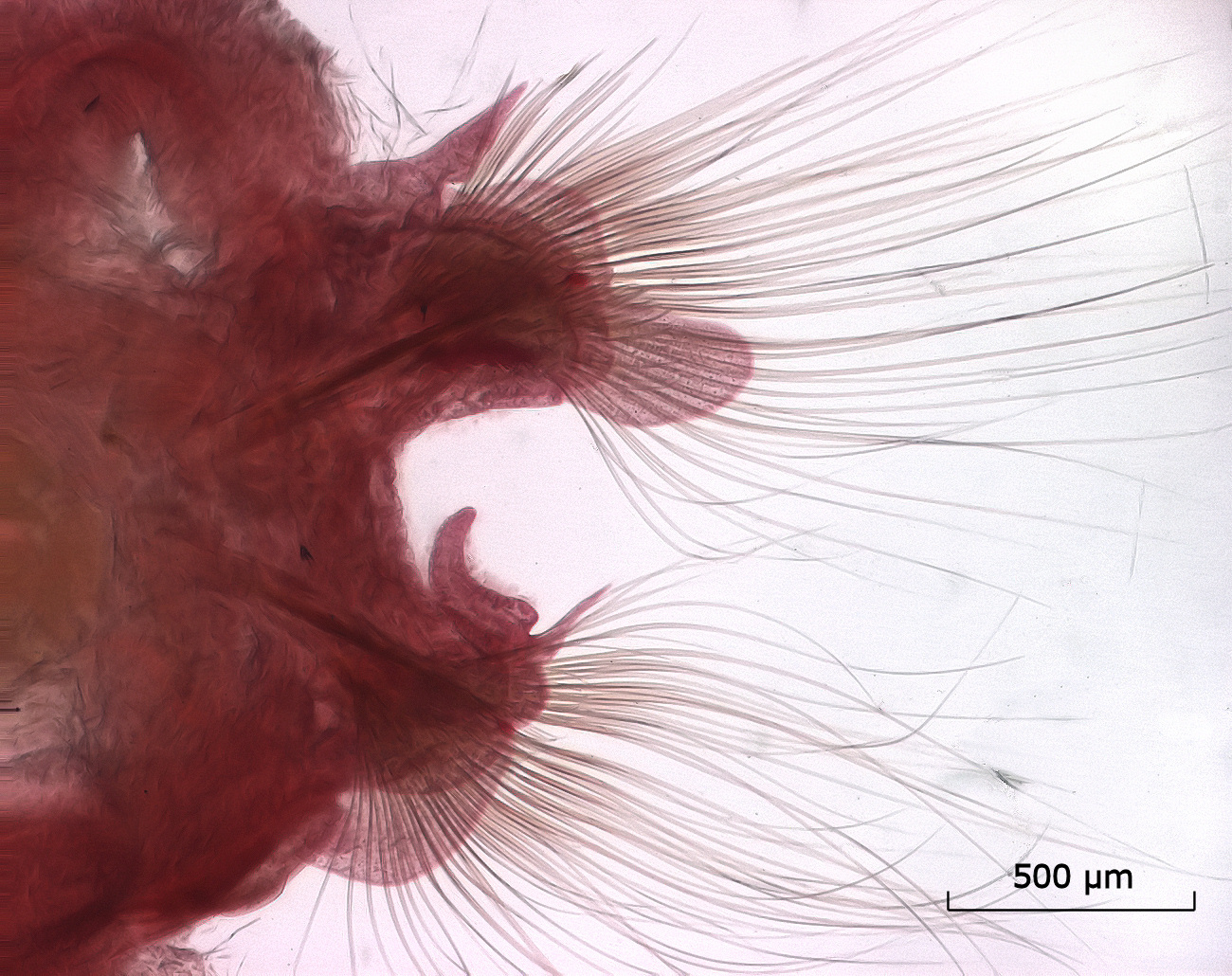
Parapod of Nephtys longosetosa

== Species ==
The following species are recognised in the genus Nephtys:

- Nephtys abranchiata Ehlers, 1913
- Nephtys acrochaeta Hartman, 1950
- Nephtys assignis Hartman, 1950
- Nephtys assimilis Örsted, 1843
- Nephtys bangladeshi Hossain & Hutchings, 2016
- Nephtys bilobatus Kudenov, 1975
- Nephtys brachycephala Moore, 1903
- Nephtys brevibranchis Hartmann-Schröder, 1959
- Nephtys bruuni Kirkegaard, 1995
- Nephtys bucera Ehlers, 1868
- Nephtys caeca (Fabricius, 1780)
- Nephtys caecoides Hartman, 1938
- Nephtys californiensis Hartman, 1938
- Nephtys capensis Day, 1953
- Nephtys chemulpoensis Jung & Hong, 1997
- Nephtys ciliata (Müller, 1788) - typetaxon
- Nephtys cirrosa Ehlers, 1868
- Nephtys cryptomma Harper, 1986
- Nephtys cuvieri Quatrefages, 1866
- Nephtys discors Ehlers, 1868
- Nephtys dussumieri Quatrefages, 1866
- Nephtys ectopa Chamberlin, 1919
- Nephtys ferruginea Hartman, 1940
- Nephtys fluviatilis Monro, 1937
- Nephtys furcifera Hartmann-Schröder, 1959
- Nephtys glabra Hartman, 1950
- Nephtys glossophylla Schmarda, 1861
- Nephtys gravieri Augener, 1913
- Nephtys hombergii (Savigny in Lamarck, 1818)
- Nephtys hudsonica Chamberlin, 1920
- Nephtys hystricis McIntosh, 1900
- Nephtys imbricata Grube, 1857
- Nephtys impressa Baird, 1871
- Nephtys incisa Malmgren, 1865
- Nephtys inornata Rainer & Hutchings, 1977
- Nephtys kersivalensis McIntosh, 1908
- Nephtys longipes Stimpson, 1856
- Nephtys longosetosa (Örsted, 1842)
- Nephtys magellanica Augener, 1912
- Nephtys mesobranchia Rainer & Hutchings, 1977
- Nephtys monilibranchiata Rozbaczylo & Castilla, 1974
- Nephtys monroi Hartman, 1950
- Nephtys multicirrata Hartmann-Schröder, 1960
- Nephtys neopolybranchia Imajima & Takeda, 1987
- Nephtys oculata Hartmann-Schröder, 1959
- Nephtys panamensis Monro, 1928
- Nephtys paradoxa Malm, 1874
- Nephtys pente Rainer, 1984
- Nephtys phasuki Nateewathana & Hylleberg, 1986
- Nephtys phyllocirra Ehlers, 1887
- Nephtys picta Ehlers, 1868
- Nephtys polybranchia Southern, 1921
- Nephtys punctata Hartman, 1938
- Nephtys quatrefagesi (Kinberg, 1866)
- Nephtys rickettsi Hartman, 1938
- Nephtys sachalinensis Alalykina & Dnestrovskaya, 2015
- Nephtys schmitti Hartman, 1938
- Nephtys semiverrucosa Rainer & Hutchings, 1977
- Nephtys serrata Imajima & Takeda, 1987
- Nephtys simoni Perkins, 1980
- Nephtys singularis Hartman, 1950
- Nephtys sinopensis Kuş, Kurt & Çinar, 2021
- Nephtys spiribranchis Ehlers, 1918
- Nephtys squamosa Ehlers, 1887
- Nephtys sukumoensis Kitamori, 1960
- Nephtys triangula Dixon-Bridges, Gladstone & Hutchings, 2014
- Nephtys tulearensis Fauvel, 1919
- Nephtys yuryi Dnestrovskaya, 2017
