= Big Snowy Group =

Stratigraphical unit of Chesterian age in the Williston Basin

- Stratigraphic range: Chesterian
- Type: Geological group
- Sub-units: Heath, Otter & Kibbey Formations
- Underlies: Tyler Formation; Watrous Formation
- Overlies: Madison Group
- Area: 51,800 square kilometres (20,000 sq mi)
- Thickness: up to 135 metres (440 ft)

Lithology
- Primary: Shale, limestone, sandstone

Location
- Region: Williston Basin; WCSB
- Country: United States, Canada

Type section
- Named for: Big Snowy Mountains
- Named by: H.W. Smith
- Year defined: 1935

The Big Snowy Group is a stratigraphical unit of Chesterian age in the Williston Basin.

It takes the name from Big Snowy Mountains in Montana, and was first described on the north slopes of the mountain by H.W. Smith in 1935.

== Lithology ==
=== Subdivisions ===
The Big Snowy Group is composed of three subdivisions, from top to base:

- Heath Formation: black shale with sandstone lenses.
- Otter Formation: limestone and grey to green shale
- Kibbey Formation: shaly sandstone

== Distribution ==
The Big Snowy Group reaches a maximum thickness of 135 metres (440 ft) in the Williston Basin. It is exposed in outcrop in the Big Snowy Mountains, Little Belt Mountains, Castle Mountains and Lombard Hills of central Montana. It occurs in the sub-surface throughout the central part of the Williston Basin and into a limited area of south-central Saskatchewan.

== Relationship to other units ==
The Big Snowy Group is unconformably overlain by the Tyler Formation in Montana, and by the Watrous Formation in Saskatchewan; It disconformably overlays the Madison Group.
