= Bealbonn =

Bealbonn Temporal range: Serpukhovian

Scientific classification
- Kingdom: Animalia
- Phylum: Chordata
- Class: Chondrichthyes
- Family: †Gregoriidae
- Genus: †Bealbonn; Lund & Grogan, 2004
- Species: †B. rogaire

Binomial name
- †Bealbonn rogaire Lund & Grogan, 2004

Extinct genus of cartilaginous fishes

Bealbonn is an extinct genus of holocephalian from the Carboniferous. It is known by a singular species, B. rogaire. It is known from the Serpukhovian-aged lagerstätte of the Bear Gulch Limestone of Montana, United States. It is one of the genera included in the family Gregoriidae.
