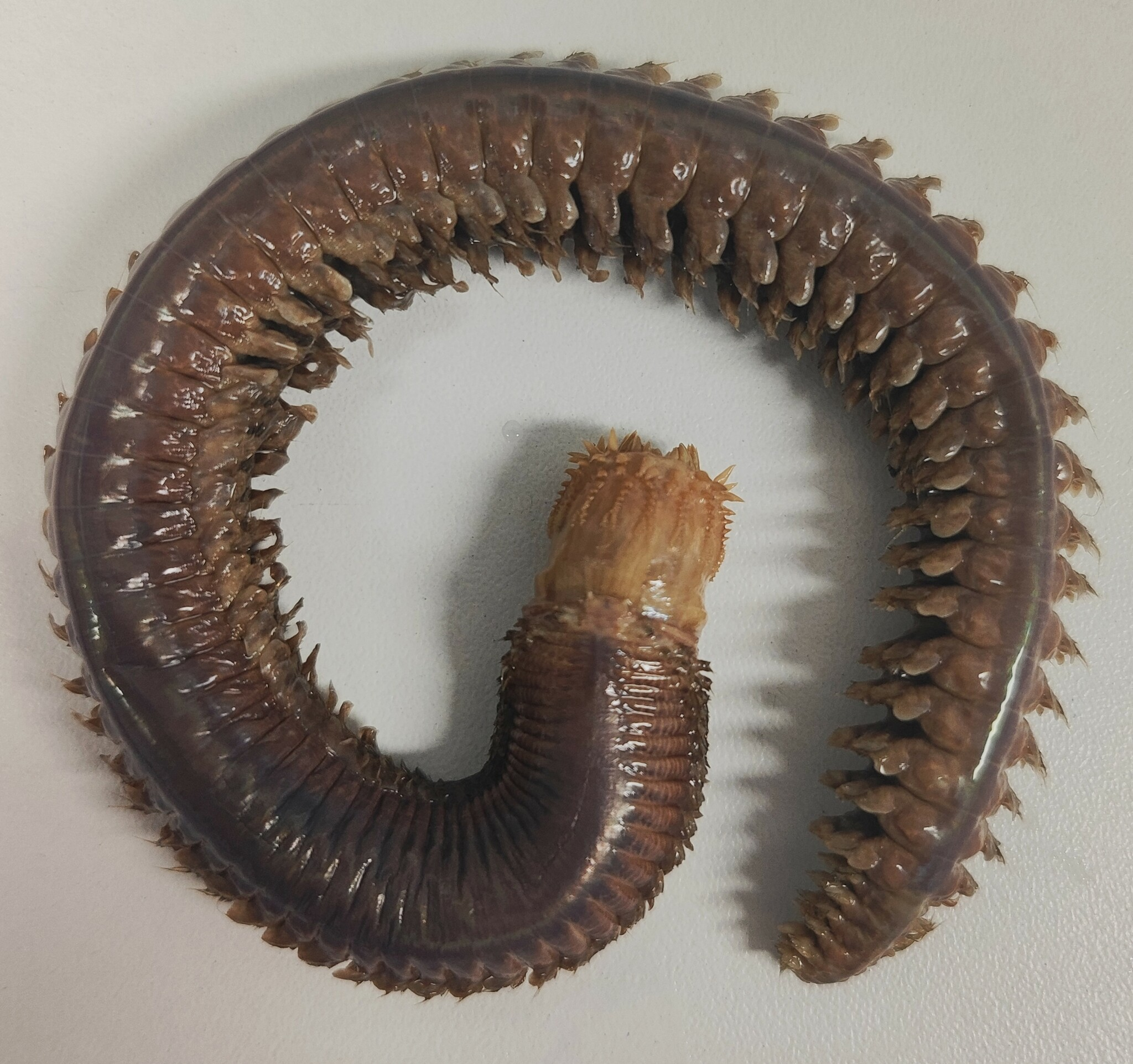
- Aglaophamus trissophyllus

Scientific classification
- Kingdom: Animalia
- Phylum: Annelida
- Clade: Pleistoannelida
- Subclass: Errantia
- Order: Phyllodocida
- Family: Nephtyidae
- Genus: Aglaophamus; Kinberg, 1866

= Aglaophamus =

Genus of annelid worms

Aglaophamus is a genus of free-burrowing nephtyid worms.

== Species ==
The following species are accepted in the genus Aglaophamus:

- Aglaophamus agilis (Langerhans, 1880)
- Aglaophamus amakusaensis Imajima & Takeda, 1985
- Aglaophamus australiensis (Fauchald, 1965)
- Aglaophamus circinata (Verrill in Smith & Harger, 1874)
- Aglaophamus dibranchis (Grube, 1877)
- Aglaophamus dicirroides Fauchald, 1968
- Aglaophamus digitatus Hartman, 1967
- Aglaophamus elamellatus (Eliason, 1951)
- Aglaophamus erectanoides Hartmann-Schröder, 1965
- Aglaophamus erectans Hartman, 1950
- Aglaophamus eugeniae Fauchald, 1972
- Aglaophamus fabrun Franco & Rizzo, 2016
- Aglaophamus foliocirrata Rainer & Kaly, 1988
- Aglaophamus foliosa Pérez-Torrijos, Hernández-Alcántara & Solís-Weiss, 2009
- Aglaophamus foliosus Hartman, 1967
- Aglaophamus fossae Fauchald, 1972
- Aglaophamus gippslandicus Rainer & Hutchings, 1977
- Aglaophamus groenlandiae Hartman, 1967
- Aglaophamus hedlandensis Rainer & Kaly, 1988
- Aglaophamus heteroserrata Hartmann-Schröder, 1965
- Aglaophamus igalis Hartman, 1965
- Aglaophamus japonicus Imajima & Takeda, 1985
- Aglaophamus jeffreysii (McIntosh, 1885)
- Aglaophamus juvenalis (Kinberg, 1866)
- Aglaophamus lobatus Imajima & Takeda, 1985
- Aglaophamus longicephalus Hartman, 1976
- Aglaophamus longicirrata Pérez-Torrijos, Hernández-Alcántara & Solís-Weiss, 2009
- Aglaophamus lutreus (Baird, 1871)
- Aglaophamus lyratus Kinberg, 1866
- Aglaophamus lyrochaeta (Fauvel, 1902)
- Aglaophamus macroura (Schmarda, 1861)
- Aglaophamus malmgreni (Théel, 1879)
- Aglaophamus munamaorii (Gibbs, 1971)
- Aglaophamus orientalis Fauchald, 1968
- Aglaophamus paramalmgreni Hartmann-Schröder & Rosenfeldt, 1992
- Aglaophamus paucilamellata Fauchald, 1972
- Aglaophamus peruana (Hartman, 1940)
- Aglaophamus phuketensis Nateewathana & Hylleberg, 1986
- Aglaophamus polyphara (Schmarda, 1861)
- Aglaophamus posterobranchus Hartman, 1967
- Aglaophamus profundus Rainer & Hutchings, 1977
- Aglaophamus pulcher (Rainer, 1991)
- Aglaophamus sinensis (Fauvel, 1932)
- Aglaophamus surrufa Fauchald, 1972
- Aglaophamus tabogensis (Monro, 1933)
- Aglaophamus tepens Fauchald, 1968
- Aglaophamus toloensis Ohwada, 1992
- Aglaophamus trissophyllus (Grube, 1877)
- Aglaophamus uruguayi Hartman, 1953
- Aglaophamus urupani Nateewathana & Hylleberg, 1986
- Aglaophamus verrilli (McIntosh, 1885)
- Aglaophamus victoriae Rainer & Kaly, 1988
- Aglaophamus vietnamensis Fauchald, 1968
- Aglaophamus virginis (Kinberg, 1866)
