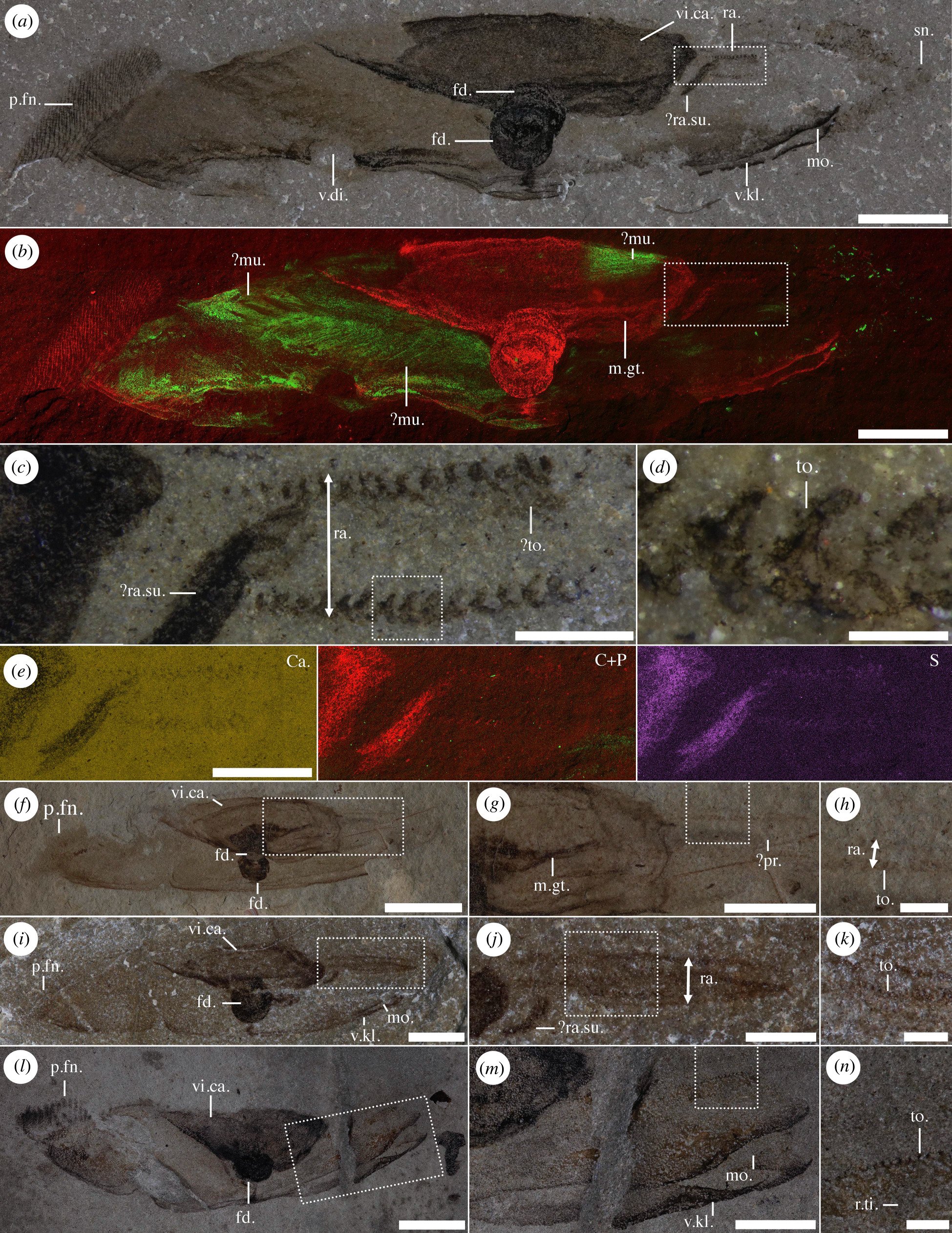
- Fossil specimens

Scientific classification
- Kingdom: Animalia
- Superphylum: Lophotrochozoa
- Phylum: Mollusca (?)
- Genus: †Typhloesus; Conway Morris, 1990
- Species: †T. wellsi

Binomial name
- †Typhloesus wellsi (Melton & Scott, 1973)

= Typhloesus =

Typhloesus Temporal range: Serpukhovian

Possible mollusk from the Carboniferous of Montana

Typhloesus wellsi is an extinct species of enigmatic bilaterian animals from the Bear Gulch Limestone, United States. It was once thought to be the first body fossil of a conodont, based on what turned out to be its gut contents; it is now thought to exhibit a radula, which would make it a mollusc, although different types of animal have independently evolved radula-like features. Mark Purnell, of the Centre for Palaeobiology at the University of Leicester, said that it was not definitively known "what this weird thing is".

== Discovery ==
Typhloesus was first described back in 1973 from Carboniferous rocks in Montana. The animal was then jokingly referred to as the 'alien goldfish' by subsequent studies. Because of its highly enigmatic nature, this organism was only mentioned briefly in several papers. It was then thought to have been the first known body fossil of a conodont, which are a primitive group of jawless agnathan fish distantly related to lampreys and hagfish. This was based on the presence of "conodont elements", which are the small comb-like teeth of those animals. The teeth however were actually located in the gut contents of the Typhloesus, meaning that while it wasn't a conodont, they were a part of its diet. The animal’s taxonomy would be shrouded in mystery for over 30 years until in September 2022, when a new paper published revealed several potential mollusk-like features of the animal.

Some specimens preserve phosphate-enriched bundles interpreted as possible muscle tissues, indicating a well-developed musculature for active swimming.

== Description ==
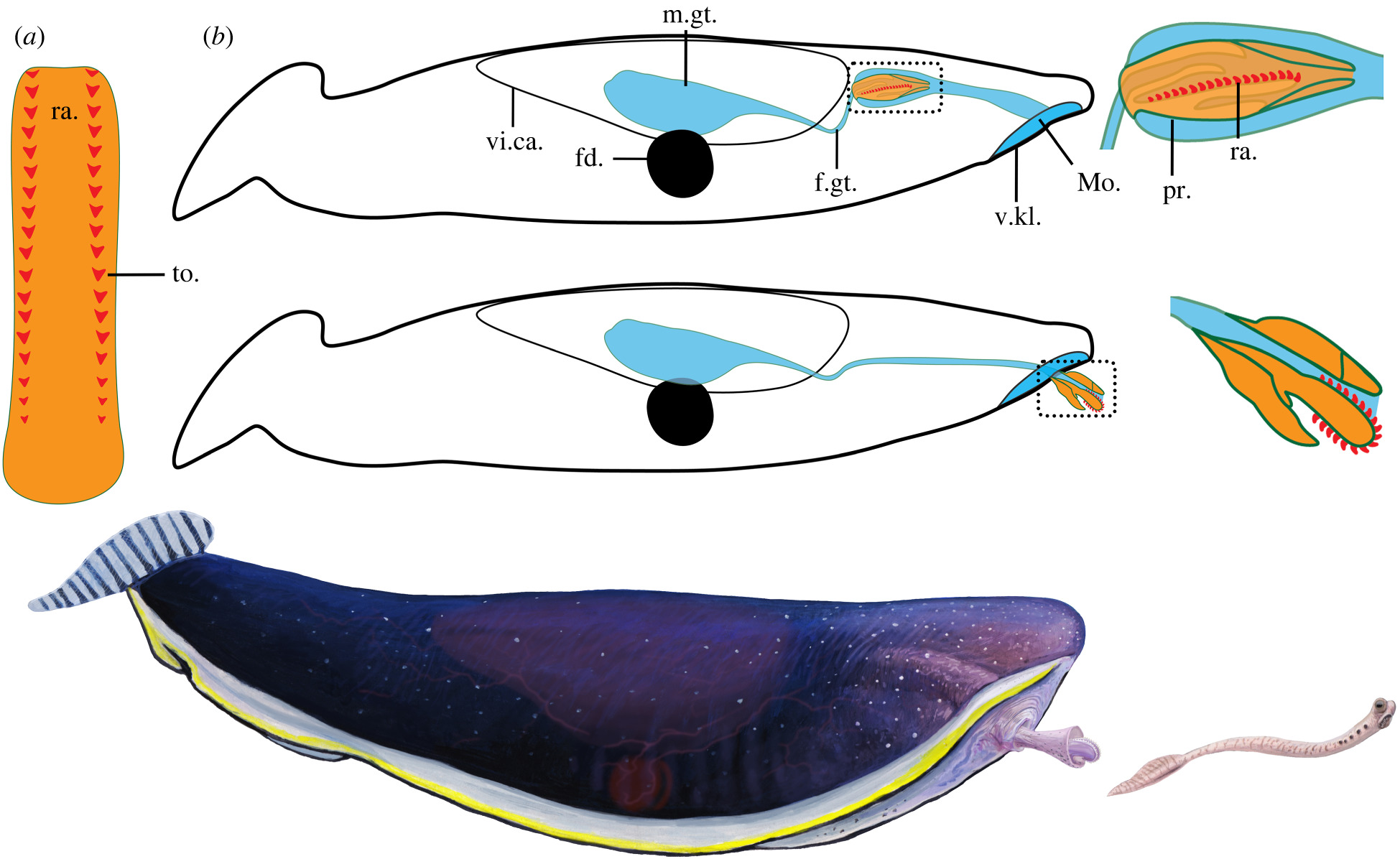
Interpretation of Typhloesus as gastropod

It has a fusiform (spindle-shaped) body, with a maximum length of 90 mm. At the posterior or backside of the animal is a caudal fin, which was supported by two sets of orthogonal fin rays. The exterior lacks any other organs. The internal anatomy consists of a foregut and a midgut. The gut lacks a midsection and an anus. Beneath the midgut is a disc shaped organ, tentatively called a ferrodiscus; the purpose of this organ is unknown, however it has a high concentration of iron.

== Paleoecology ==
It might have been both a predator and a scavenger, as its fossils sometimes contain conodont teeth and worm teeth located in the midgut of the animal.

== See also ==
- Tullimonstrum, another enigmatic animal from the upper Carboniferous of Illinois.
