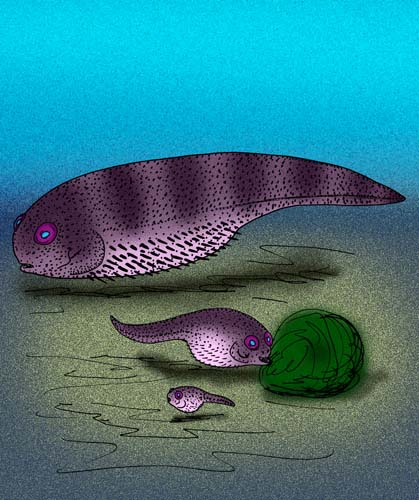

Scientific classification
- Kingdom: Animalia
- Phylum: Chordata
- Class: Chondrichthyes
- Genus: †Delphyodontos
- Species: †D. dacriformes

Binomial name
- †Delphyodontos dacriformes Lund, 1980

= Delphyodontos =

Delphyodontos Temporal range: Serpukhovian

Genus of cartilaginous fishes

Delphyodontos dacriformes is a prehistoric basal cartilaginous fish from the Late Mississippian-aged Bear Gulch Limestone Lagerstätte of Montana. The adult form is unknown, as the only fossil specimens are of aborted fetuses or recently born young. Sharp teeth and fecal matter in the fossils suggests that Delphyodontos practiced intrauterine cannibalism.

== Etymology ==
The generic name, Delphyodontos, means "womb tooth". The specific name, dacriformes, refers to the teardrop-shaped (dacriform) body.

== Appearance ==
Two fetal specimens were originally described, measuring 35 mm (1.4 in, holotype) and 29 mm (1.1 in) in length. Preserved jaw anatomy shows two pairs of tooth plates on the upper jaw and one on the lower jaw. On the upper jaw, teeth on the smaller anterior tooth plates are free halfway through, while the posterior tooth plate is more compressed, with the tips of the teeth forming a serrated edge. Teeth on the lower jaw are taller, thinner and more distinct from each other, and show a strong posterior curvature. This dentition, adapted for slashing and tearing, is believed to have assisted in intrauterine oophagy, rather than being indicative of Delphyodontos being a predator later in life.

The body, fully covered in dermal denticles, is tadpole-shaped, with an enlarged abdomen. The latter is believed to represent a foregut specialized for intrauterine oophagy, as in fetuses of the modern-day shark Lamna. A fecal bolus is known from the smaller specimen. Fins are undifferentiated, with the exception of the hypochordal caudal fin. The presence of a dorsal fin spine on only one specimen indicates that Delphyodontos was sexually dimorphic, with fin spines only being present in males.

Delphyodontos was viviparous. Intrauterine oophagy allowed for a longer gestation period beyond what egg yolk consumption alone could provide.

== Taxonomy ==
When first described, Delphyodontos was provisionally classified as a holocephalan based on its skull morphology and body shape. A 2009 phylogeny found Delphyodontos to be related to ElWeir, an undescribed chondrichthyan also known from the Bear Gulch Formation. According to that study, the two would form a clade at the base of Chondrichthyes, having branched before the divergence between Iniopterygia, Elasmobranchii and Holocephali. A 2012 study placed Delphyodontos crownwards of Iniopterygia, branching immediately before the divergence between Elasmobranchii and Holocephali.

== Paleoecology ==
Delphyodontos is known from the Bear Gulch Limestone, a Late Mississippian-aged Lagerstätte from Montana representing a shallow marine bay of tropical waters. It was a benthic animal, whose range extended from the bay mouth to the habitat's reef and upper basin.
