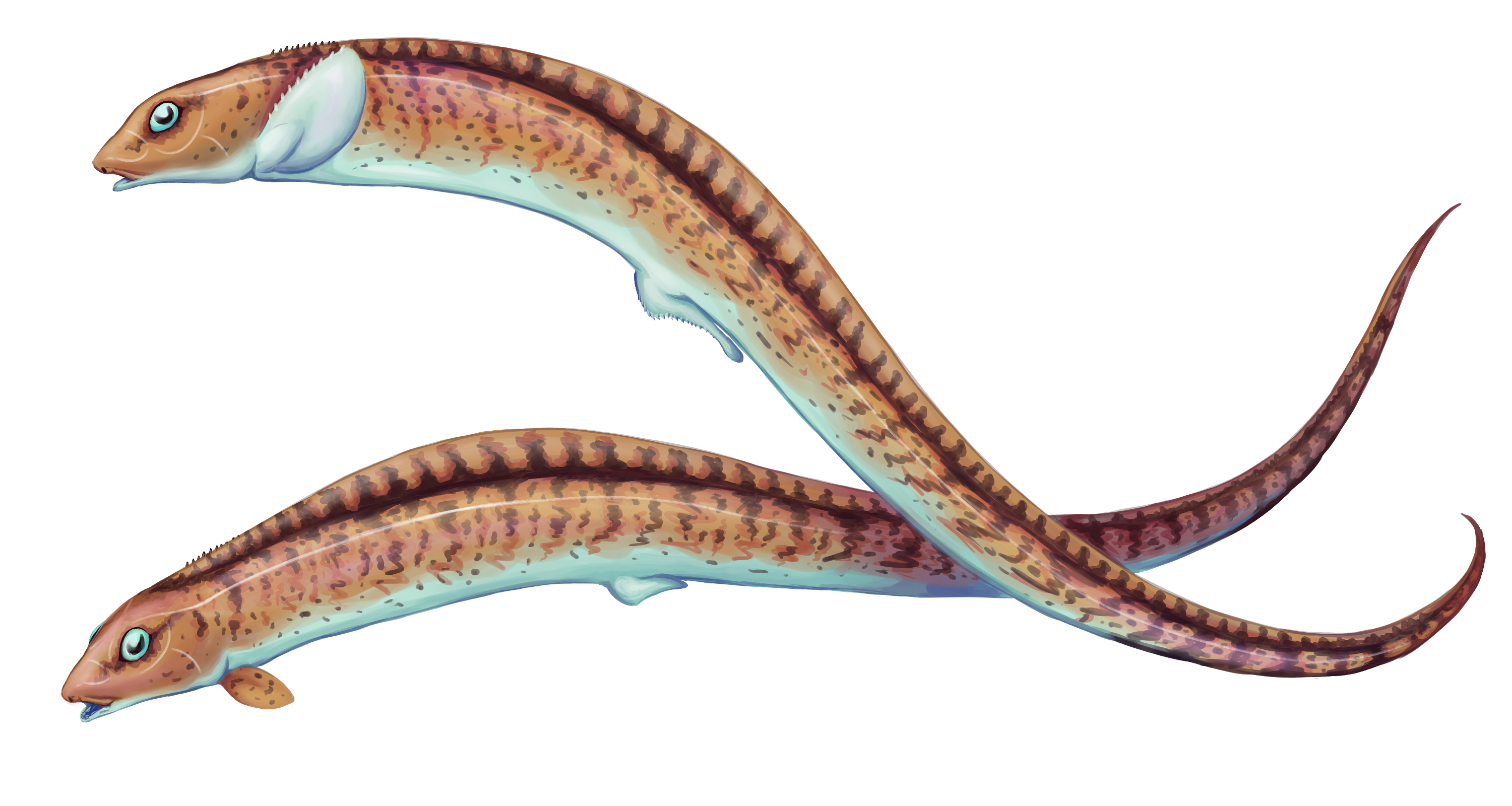
- Life restoration of a male (above) and a female

Scientific classification
- Kingdom: Animalia
- Phylum: Chordata
- Class: Chondrichthyes
- Subclass: Holocephali
- Order: †Chondrenchelyiformes
- Family: †Chondrenchelyidae
- Genus: †Chondrenchelys; Traquair, 1888
- Species: †C. problematica

Binomial name
- †Chondrenchelys problematica Traquair, 1888

= Chondrenchelys =

Chondrenchelys Temporal range: Visean

Extinct genus of cartilaginous fishes

Chondrenchelys is an extinct genus of cartilaginous fish and the earliest member of Holocephali known from complete skeletons. Chondrenchelys would have been quite a relatively medium-sized fish with an elongated body up to 18 cm (0.59 ft)in length, it had a dorsal fin which was indeed long and a body which tapered to a point. Chondrenchelys had one large pair, one middle-sized pair, and three small pair of tooth plates in each jaw. The genus name derives from the Greek word χόνδρος, meaning “gristle” or “cartilage”, and ἔγχελυς, meaning “eel”. The speciea name, problematicus, is likely derived from the lack of scales setting it apart from all other fish known at the time of discovery.

== See also ==
- List of prehistoric cartilaginous fish
