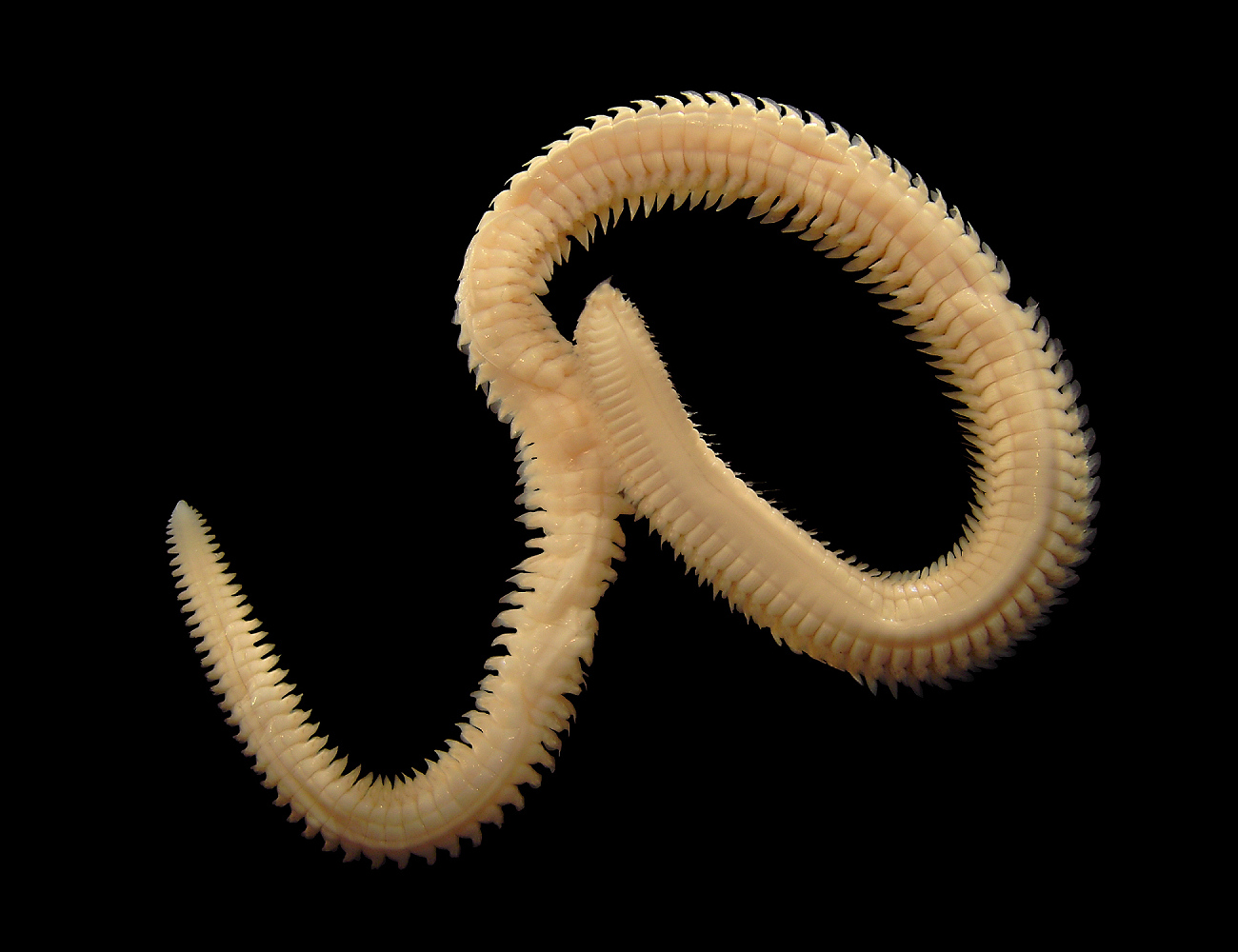
- Nephtys hombergii

Scientific classification
- Domain: Eukaryota
- Kingdom: Animalia
- Phylum: Annelida
- Clade: Pleistoannelida
- Subclass: Errantia
- Order: Phyllodocida
- Family: Nephtyidae

Genera
- Aglaophamus; Dentinephtys; Inermonephtys; Micronephthys; Nephtys; Pellucidaria

= Nephtyidae =

Family of annelids

Nephtyidae is a family of polychaete worms. They are commonly referred to as catworms.

== Characteristics ==
Nephtyidae are pale, clearly segmented polychaetes with a small pentagonal prostomium with two pairs of small antennae. Their segments are little differentiated and have a rectangular cross-section.
Nephtyids are active predators, with a strong muscular proboscis, armed with two well developed jaws.

They can dig relatively fast through sandy sediments. They can also swim with sinuous movements.

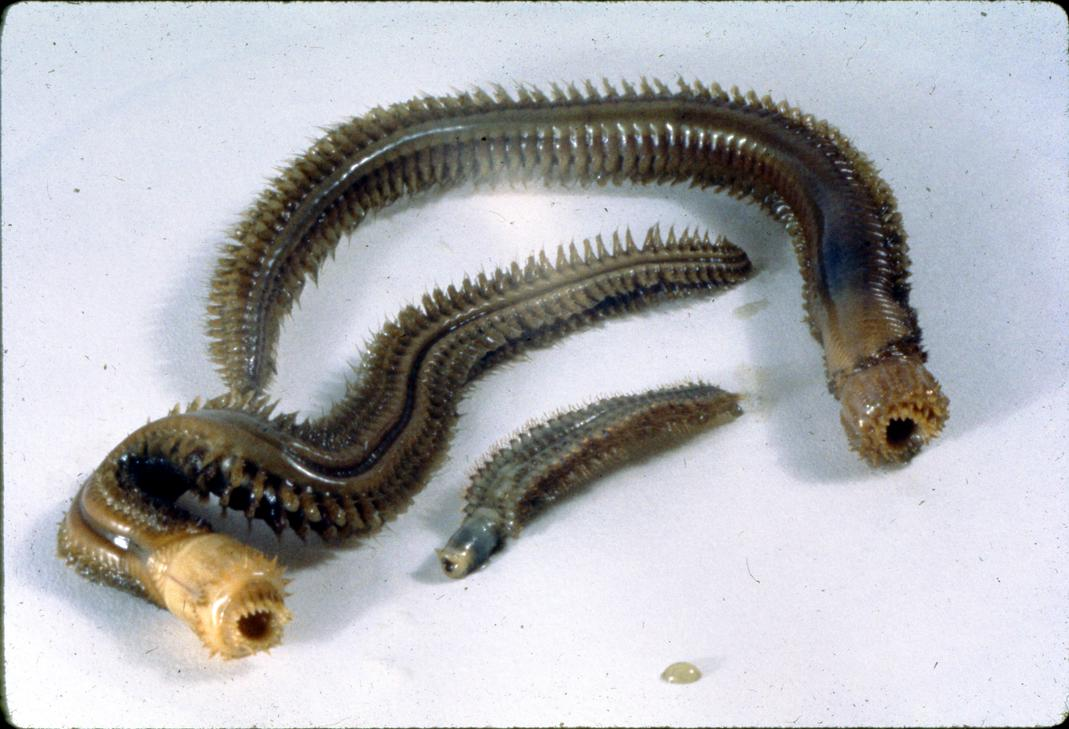
Nepthyidae polychaetes, found off the Palmer Peninsula, Antarctica, 1962.
