= Hardistiella =

Hardistiella Temporal range: 326.4–318.1 Ma

Scientific classification
- Kingdom: Animalia
- Phylum: Chordata
- Infraphylum: Agnatha
- Superclass: Cyclostomi
- Class: Petromyzontida
- Order: Petromyzontiformes
- Family: †Hardistiellidae; Halstead 1993
- Genus: †Hardistiella; Janvier and Lund 1983
- Species: †H. montanensis

Binomial name
- †Hardistiella montanensis Janvier and Lund 1983

Extinct genus of lampreys

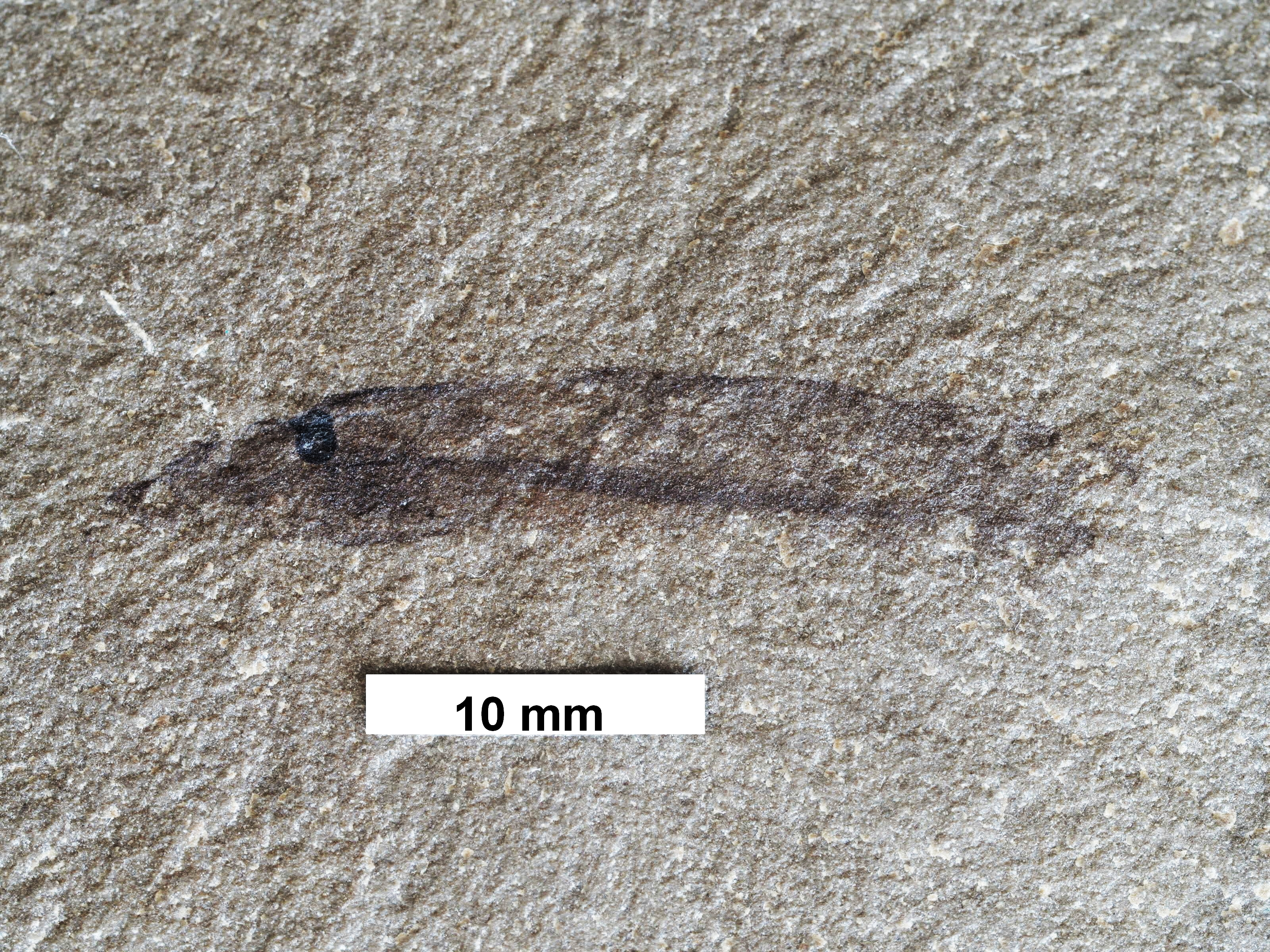
The lamprey Hardistiella montanensis from the Carboniferous of Bear Gulch, Montana. Coll. Oilshale.

Hardistiella montanensis is an extinct species of lamprey, found, dating from the Carboniferous period, at the Bear Gulch Limestone site in the U.S. state of Montana.
