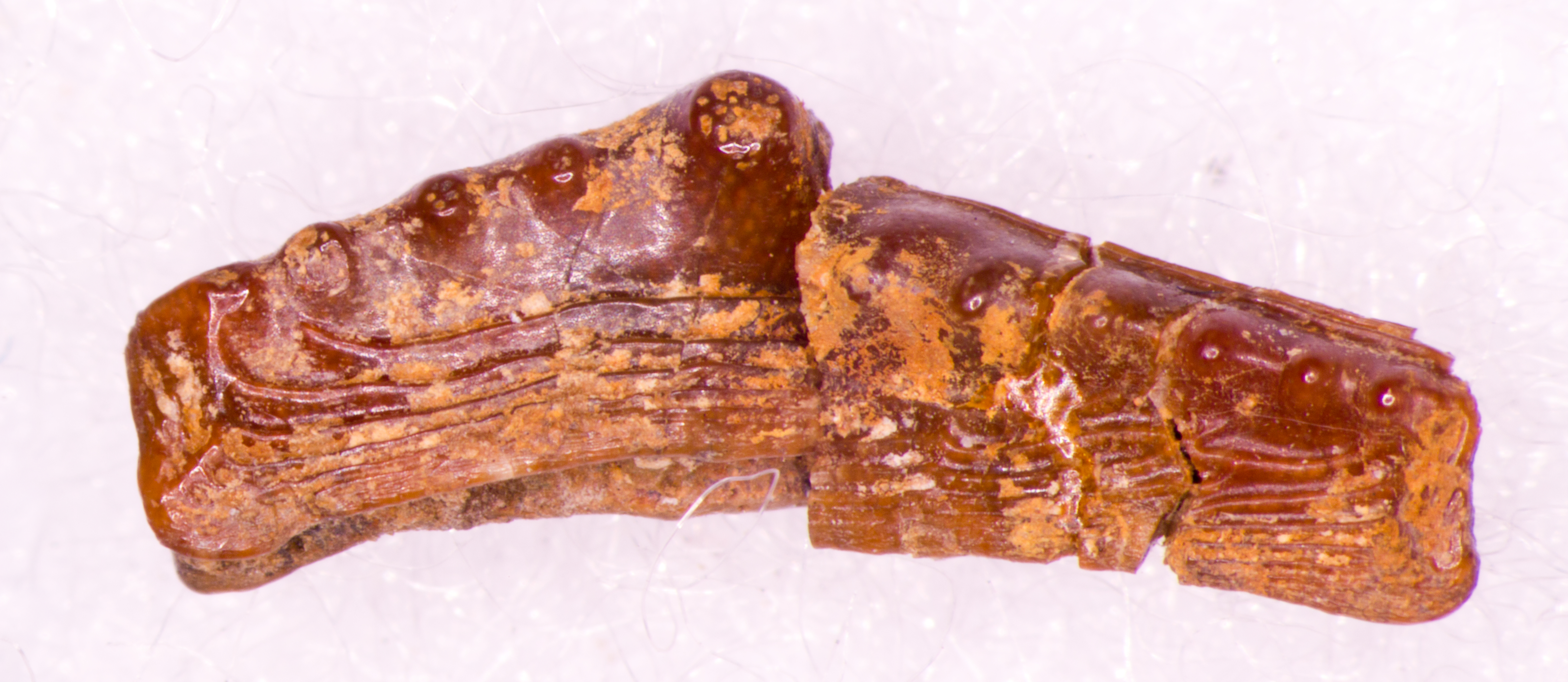
- Tooth of V. argutus from the collection of the Smithsonian Museum of Natural History

Scientific classification
- Kingdom: Animalia
- Phylum: Chordata
- Class: Chondrichthyes
- Subclass: Holocephali
- Order: Cochliodontiformes?
- Family: Cochliodontidae?
- Genus: Venustodus St. John & Worthen, 1875

Species
- †V. argutus St. John & Worthen, 1875; †V. leidyi St. John & Worthen, 1875; †V. robustus St. John & Worthen, 1875; †V. tenuicristatus St. John & Worthen, 1875; †V. variabilis St. John & Worthen, 1875; †V. venustus Leidy, 1857

= Venustodus =

Venustodus Temporal range: Carboniferous, 347–307 Ma

Extinct genus of cartilaginous fish

Venustodus is an extinct genus of cartilaginous fish from the Carboniferous of Russia and the United States. It has been assigned either to the family Cochliodontidae or an indeterminate position within the subclass Holocephali, although in 1984 researcher Rainer Zangerl insisted that nothing is known of the genus' classification and that it may be unrelated to holocephalans. All species of Venustodus are believed to have been nektonic, marine carnivores.
