= Tylonautilus =

Scientific classification
- Domain: Eukaryota
- Kingdom: Animalia
- Phylum: Mollusca
- Class: Cephalopoda
- Subclass: Nautiloidea
- Order: Nautilida
- Family: †Tainoceratidae
- Genus: †Tylonautilus; Pringle and Jackson (1928)

Extinct genus of nautiloids

Tylonautilus is an extinct genus in the nautiloid order Nautilida from the Lower Carboniferous of Europe and Permian of Japan.

Tylonautilus has a coiled shell with a subquadrate whorl section, evolutely coiled with all whorls showing. The outer rim, the venter, has a smooth median depression bordered on either side by thread-like lirae, followed by rows of nodes, radially arranged. The suture has broad ventral and lateral lobes, the siphuncle is central.

Tylonautilus is a member of the Tainoceratidae which, with other related families, forms the nautiloid superfamily Tainocerataceae. As with most if not all tainoceratids, Tylonautilus was probably a bottom dweller that spent its time crawling over, or perhaps swimming close to, the seafloor.
