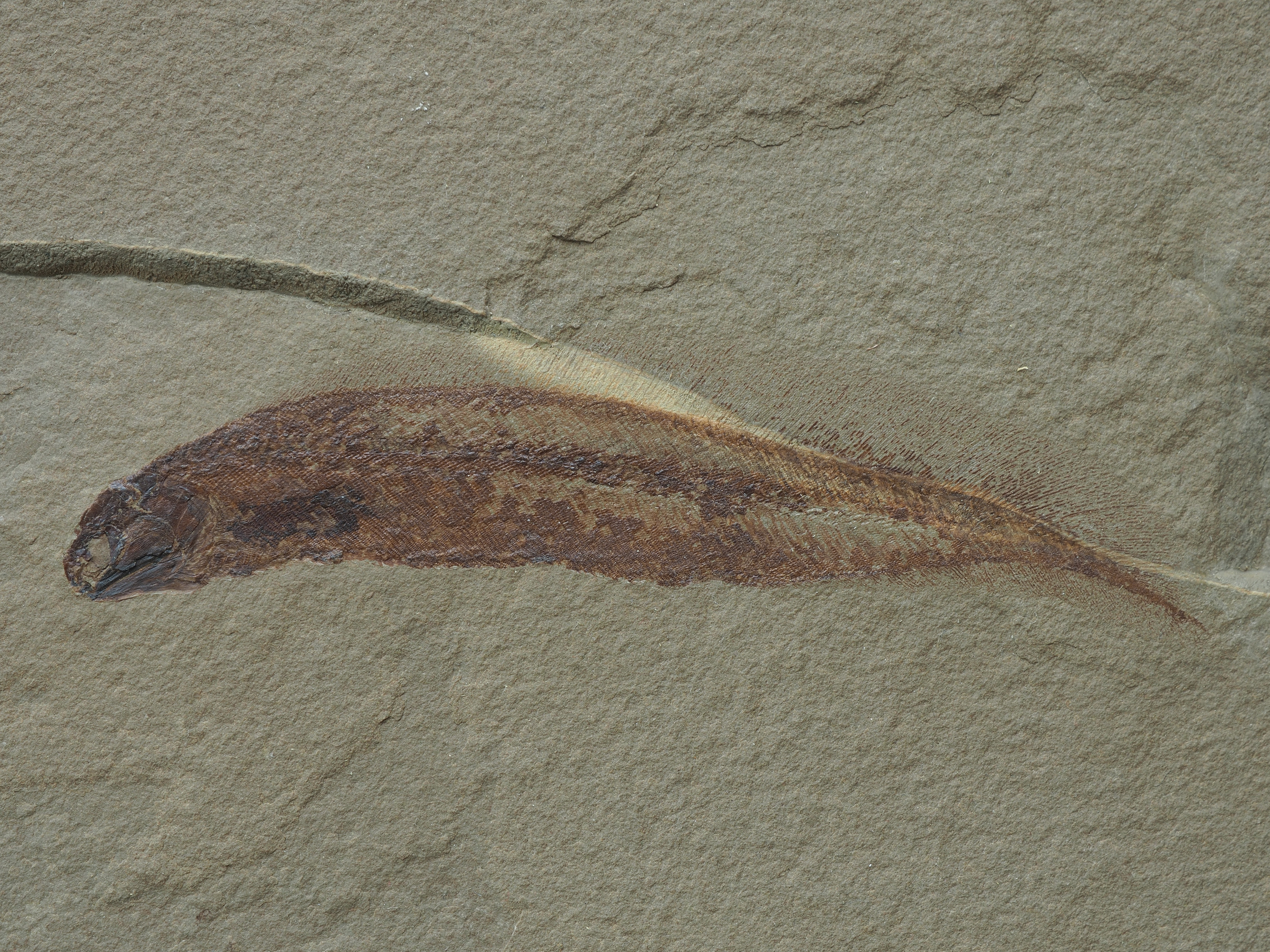
- †Paratarrasius hibbardi Lund and Melton Jr. 1982 from the Mississippian (Serpukhovian) Heath Formation of Bear Gulch, Montana

Scientific classification
- Kingdom: Animalia
- Phylum: Chordata
- Class: Actinopterygii
- Order: †Tarrasiiformes

Families
- Tarrasiidae Traquair 1881 emend. Woodward 1891

= Tarrasiiformes =

Tarrasiiformes Temporal range: Carboniferous

Extinct order of fishes

Tarrasiiformes is an extinct order of prehistoric ray-finned fish.

== Taxonomy ==
- Order †Tarrasiiformes sensu Lund & Poplin 2002 [Haplistia]
  - Family †Tarrasiidae Traquair 1881 emend. Woodward 1891
    - Genus †Apholidotos Lund ex Frickinger 1991
      - Species †Apholidotos ossna Lund ex Frickinger 1991
    - Genus †Paratarrasius Lund & Melton 1982
      - Species †Paratarrasius hibbardi Lund & Melton 1982
    - Genus †Tarrasius Traquair 1881
      - Species †Tarrasius problematicus Traquair 1881

== Timeline of genera ==
Tarrasius is an extinct genus of Tarasiiformes. Tarrasius problematicus (of Mississippian origin, ~ 350 Ma) featured a fully regionalized tetrapod-like spine divided into 5 distinct segments. It is not considered a transitional fossil though, but an extreme example of convergent evolution.

== See also ==
- Prehistoric fish
- List of prehistoric bony fish
- Convergent evolution

== Bibliography ==
- Sepkoski, Jack (2002). "A compendium of fossil marine animal genera". Bulletins of American Paleontology. 363: 1–560.
