= Big Snowy Mountains =

Mountain range in Montana, United States

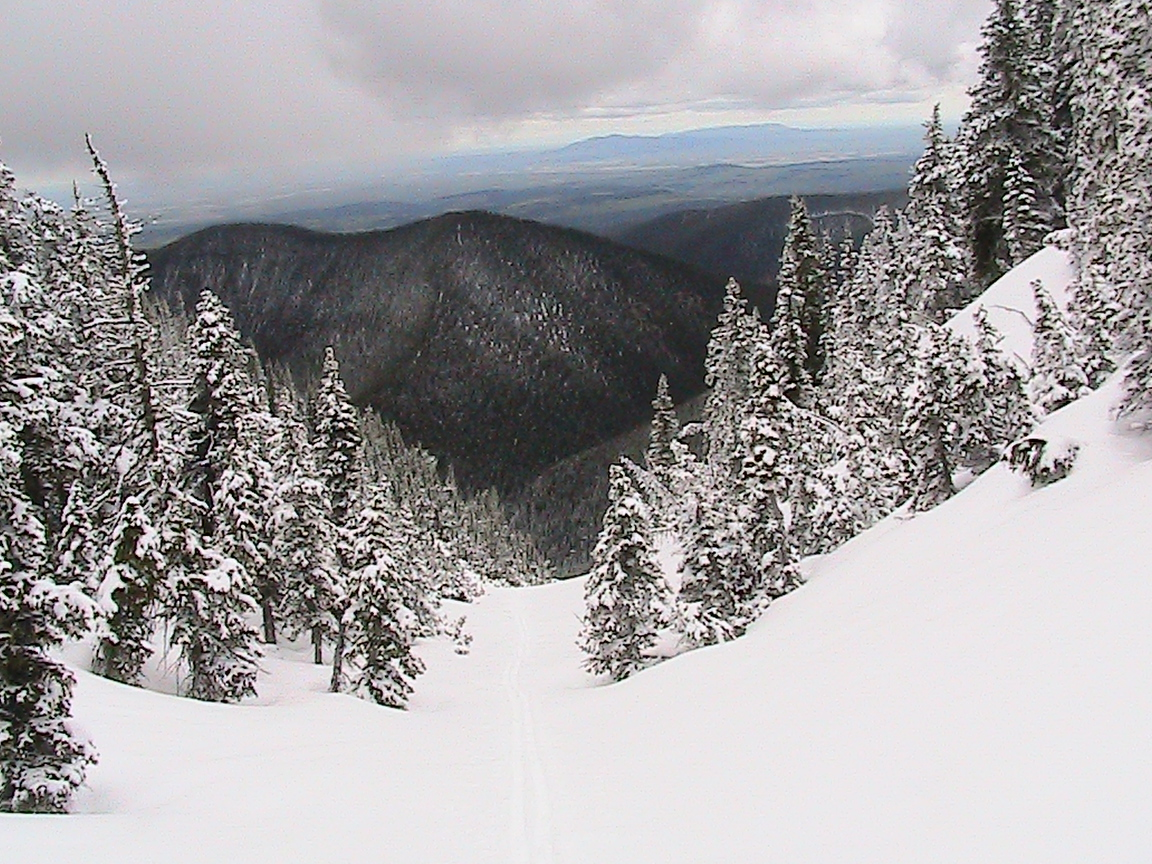

Highest point
- Peak: Greathouse Peak
- Elevation: 8,681 ft (2,646 m)
- Coordinates: 46°42′30″N 109°13′28″W

Geography
- Location within Montana
- Country: United States
- State: Montana

The Big Snowy Mountains (Gros Ventre: níichʔibííkʔa, lit. 'it is never summer') are a small mountain range south of Lewistown in Fergus County, Montana. Considerably east of and isolated from the main crest of the Northern Rockies, they are one of the few points of significant elevation in the immediate area and are considered one of Montana's island ranges. The range's highest elevation is 8,681 feet (2,646 m). The smaller Little Snowy Mountains are a contiguous range immediately to the east.

About 112,000 acres of the Big Snowies are roadless, the bulk of this on the Lewis and Clark National Forest, as well as 6,870 acres in the Twin Coulees Wilderness Study Area on adjacent BLM land; 98,000 acres of the National Forest land are also a Wilderness Study Area. The Big Snowies features a long, relatively level east-west summit ridge, rising above timberline, that culminates in Greathouse Peak, the highest point in the range. On a clear day the view from the top of Greathouse Peak extends from Canada to Yellowstone. A number of caves, some unexplored, exist on the west end of the range, including the frozen-walled Ice Cave, which is often up to 40 degrees cooler than outside summer temperatures.

The dominant tree species include ponderosa pine, douglas-fir, and subalpine fir on the heavily forested north slope, while the south slope is drier. Wildlife includes rattlesnakes and pronghorn on the grass-covered lower elevations and deer and black bear higher up.

== Climate ==
Crystal Lake is a SNOTEL weather station in the Big Snowy Mountains. Crystal Lake has a subalpine climate (Köppen Dfc), bordering on a humid continental climate (Köppen Dfb).

Climate data for Crystal Lake, Montana, 1991–2020 normals, 1988-2023 extremes: 6050ft (1844m)
Month	Jan	Feb	Mar	Apr	May	Jun	Jul	Aug	Sep	Oct	Nov	Dec	Year
Record high °F (°C)	55 (13)	62 (17)	68 (20)	76 (24)	79 (26)	90 (32)	93 (34)	92 (33)	91 (33)	81 (27)	66 (19)	55 (13)	93 (34)
Mean maximum °F (°C)	49.1 (9.5)	51.5 (10.8)	60.0 (15.6)	67.5 (19.7)	73.5 (23.1)	80.3 (26.8)	86.3 (30.2)	86.0 (30.0)	81.4 (27.4)	70.0 (21.1)	54.7 (12.6)	47.7 (8.7)	87.5 (30.8)
Mean daily maximum °F (°C)	31.8 (−0.1)	34.0 (1.1)	42.6 (5.9)	48.2 (9.0)	56.1 (13.4)	64.2 (17.9)	74.1 (23.4)	73.2 (22.9)	63.0 (17.2)	48.5 (9.2)	37.4 (3.0)	30.4 (−0.9)	50.3 (10.2)
Daily mean °F (°C)	22.2 (−5.4)	22.7 (−5.2)	30.5 (−0.8)	36.2 (2.3)	44.0 (6.7)	51.7 (10.9)	59.6 (15.3)	58.7 (14.8)	50.1 (10.1)	38.1 (3.4)	28.2 (−2.1)	21.6 (−5.8)	38.6 (3.7)
Mean daily minimum °F (°C)	12.6 (−10.8)	11.3 (−11.5)	18.3 (−7.6)	24.1 (−4.4)	31.8 (−0.1)	39.2 (4.0)	45.1 (7.3)	44.2 (6.8)	37.2 (2.9)	27.8 (−2.3)	18.9 (−7.3)	12.6 (−10.8)	26.9 (−2.8)
Mean minimum °F (°C)	−14.2 (−25.7)	−13.0 (−25.0)	−5.6 (−20.9)	8.2 (−13.2)	19.7 (−6.8)	29.7 (−1.3)	35.5 (1.9)	33.6 (0.9)	25.5 (−3.6)	9.6 (−12.4)	−4.1 (−20.1)	−11.9 (−24.4)	−25.4 (−31.9)
Record low °F (°C)	−34 (−37)	−39 (−39)	−31 (−35)	−13 (−25)	9 (−13)	24 (−4)	23 (−5)	19 (−7)	11 (−12)	−16 (−27)	−27 (−33)	−38 (−39)	−39 (−39)
Average precipitation inches (mm)	2.69 (68)	2.57 (65)	3.13 (80)	5.22 (133)	5.80 (147)	5.33 (135)	2.53 (64)	2.66 (68)	2.92 (74)	3.67 (93)	2.73 (69)	2.57 (65)	41.82 (1,061)
Average extreme snow depth inches (cm)	39.6 (101)	49.3 (125)	51.8 (132)	52.3 (133)	41.2 (105)	5.7 (14)	0.0 (0.0)	0.0 (0.0)	2.3 (5.8)	11.1 (28)	19.4 (49)	30.6 (78)	58.4 (148)
Source 1: XMACIS2(normals, extremes & 2003-2020 snow depth)
Source 2: NOAA (precipitation)

Lewistown 11 SSE is a weather station on the northern slopes of the Big Snowy Mountains, situated at an elevation of 4965 ft (1513 m). Lewistown 11 SSE has a humid continental climate (Köppen Dfb), with long, snowy winters and short, warm summers.

Climate data for Lewistown 11 SSE, Montana, 1991–2020 normals, 1949-2023 extremes: 4965ft (1513m)
Month	Jan	Feb	Mar	Apr	May	Jun	Jul	Aug	Sep	Oct	Nov	Dec	Year
Record high °F (°C)	65 (18)	63 (17)	72 (22)	83 (28)	87 (31)	93 (34)	100 (38)	101 (38)	95 (35)	89 (32)	74 (23)	65 (18)	101 (38)
Mean maximum °F (°C)	55.1 (12.8)	53.4 (11.9)	61.1 (16.2)	71.2 (21.8)	76.6 (24.8)	84.8 (29.3)	90.9 (32.7)	92.1 (33.4)	88.1 (31.2)	76.6 (24.8)	64.8 (18.2)	55.6 (13.1)	90.3 (32.4)
Mean daily maximum °F (°C)	37.1 (2.8)	37.3 (2.9)	45.4 (7.4)	50.8 (10.4)	61.6 (16.4)	68.2 (20.1)	79.6 (26.4)	79.2 (26.2)	69.2 (20.7)	56.5 (13.6)	44.2 (6.8)	36.1 (2.3)	55.4 (13.0)
Daily mean °F (°C)	25.3 (−3.7)	24.8 (−4.0)	32.4 (0.2)	38.5 (3.6)	48.9 (9.4)	55.9 (13.3)	64.1 (17.8)	63.2 (17.3)	54.2 (12.3)	43.4 (6.3)	32.6 (0.3)	24.9 (−3.9)	42.3 (5.7)
Mean daily minimum °F (°C)	13.4 (−10.3)	12.3 (−10.9)	19.4 (−7.0)	26.1 (−3.3)	36.1 (2.3)	43.5 (6.4)	48.6 (9.2)	47.1 (8.4)	39.1 (3.9)	30.2 (−1.0)	21.0 (−6.1)	13.7 (−10.2)	29.2 (−1.5)
Mean minimum °F (°C)	−16.6 (−27.0)	−19.8 (−28.8)	−7.2 (−21.8)	7.1 (−13.8)	23.2 (−4.9)	34.4 (1.3)	38.0 (3.3)	37.1 (2.8)	26.8 (−2.9)	10.4 (−12.0)	−4.0 (−20.0)	−15.4 (−26.3)	−26.2 (−32.3)
Record low °F (°C)	−34 (−37)	−36 (−38)	−35 (−37)	−8 (−22)	11 (−12)	28 (−2)	29 (−2)	32 (0)	18 (−8)	−9 (−23)	−23 (−31)	−34 (−37)	−36 (−38)
Average precipitation inches (mm)	0.90 (23)	0.79 (20)	1.18 (30)	2.34 (59)	3.87 (98)	4.15 (105)	2.13 (54)	2.19 (56)	2.07 (53)	1.76 (45)	1.03 (26)	0.87 (22)	23.28 (591)
Average snowfall inches (cm)	17.50 (44.5)	16.40 (41.7)	19.50 (49.5)	17.20 (43.7)	3.10 (7.9)	0.20 (0.51)	0.00 (0.00)	0.00 (0.00)	2.10 (5.3)	8.80 (22.4)	11.20 (28.4)	16.10 (40.9)	112.1 (284.81)
Average precipitation days (≥ 0.01 in)	6.8	6.5	7.8	9.0	11.2	13.0	9.9	7.9	6.9	6.9	6.0	6.2	98.1
Average snowy days (≥ 0.1 in)	7.1	6.2	6.8	5.2	1.6	0.0	0.0	0.0	0.9	3.1	4.9	5.7	41.5
Source 1: NOAA
Source 2: XMACIS2 (temp records & 2010-2023 monthly max/mins)

== See also ==
- List of mountain ranges in Montana
