= Cosmoselachus =

Cosmoselachus Temporal range: Carboniferous (Upper Mississippian), Middle Chesterian

Scientific classification
- Kingdom: Animalia
- Phylum: Chordata
- Class: Chondrichthyes
- Order: †Symmoriiformes
- Family: †Falcatidae
- Genus: †Cosmoselachus
- Species: †C. mehlingi

Binomial name
- †Cosmoselachus mehlingi Bronson et al., 2024

Genus of extinct chondrichthyans

Cosmoselachus is an extinct genus of symmoriiform chondrichthyan from the Upper Carboniferous (Mississippian subperiod) aged Fayetteville Shale of Arkansas, United States. The genus contains a single species, C. mehlingi, which is known from a partial specimen that includes the cranium, jaws, gill arches, pectoral fins, and teeth.

== Discovery and naming ==
The Cosmoselachus holotype specimen, AMNH FF 20509, was discovered in 1979 in sediments of the Fayetteville Shale near Cove Creek in Searcy County, Arkansas, United States. Since its discovery, the specimen has been damaged and it has experienced pyrite decay while in storage at AMNH. The fossil consists of the nearly complete lower jaws with teeth, a partial upper jaw and basicranium, gill arch elements, cartilage from a partial pectoral girdle, pectoral fins and fin impressions.

In 2024, Allison Bronson and others described Cosmoselachus mehlingi as a new genus and species of shark-like cartilaginous fish based on these fossil remains. The generic name, "Cosmoselachus", combines "Cosm", the nickname of AMNH museum specialist Carl Mehling, with the Greek "σέλαχος" ("selachos"), which refers to cartilaginous fish. The specific name, "mehlingi", honors Carl Mehling and his paleontological contributions.

== Classification ==
In their phylogenetic analyses, Bronson and coauthors recovered Cosmoselachus a falcatid member of the order Symmoriiformes. This clade was recovered outside of the Holocephali, contrasting with some other studies. Their results are shown in the cladogram below:

- Symmoriiformes
  - Cosmoselachus
  - Ferromirum
  - - Cladoselache
    - - - Akmonistion
        - Kawichthys
      - - Cobelodus
        - - Dwykaselachus
          - Ozarcus
