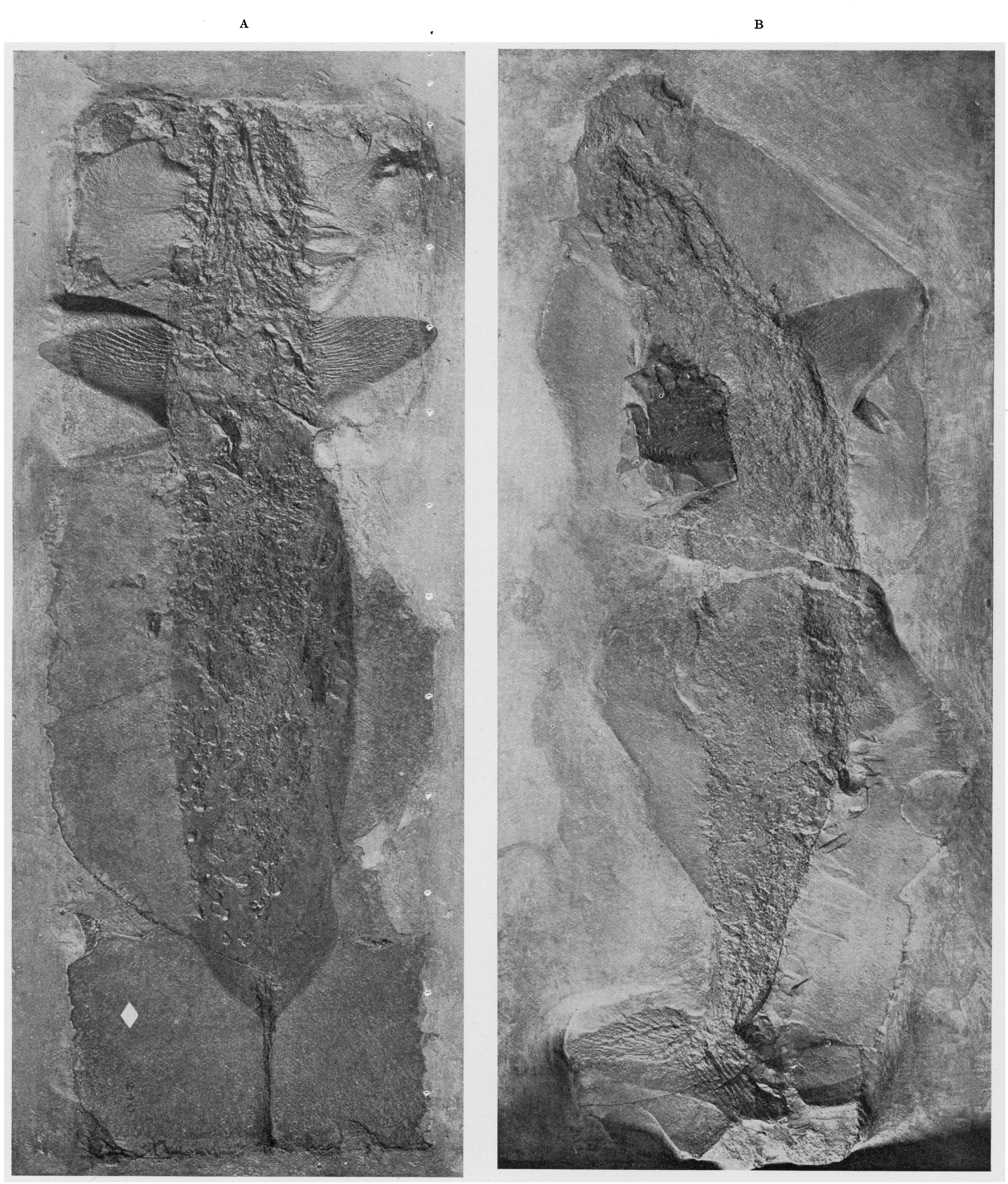
- Complete C. fyleri specimens in the American Museum of Natural History

Scientific classification
- Kingdom: Animalia
- Phylum: Chordata
- Class: Chondrichthyes
- Subclass: Holocephali
- Order: †Cladoselachiformes
- Family: †Cladoselachidae
- Genus: †Cladoselache; Dean, 1894

Species
- List of species: Cladoselache acanthopterygius Dean, 1909; Cladoselache brachypterygius Dean, 1909; Cladoselache clarki (Claypole, 1893); Cladoselache desmopterygius Dean, 1909; Cladoselache eastmani Dean, 1909; Cladoselache fyleri (Newberry, 1889); Cladoselache kepleri (Newberry, 1888); Cladoselache magnificus (Claypole, 1894); Cladoselache newberryi Dean, 1894; Cladoselache pachypterygius Dean, 1909

Synonyms
- Monocladodus? Claypole, 1893

= Cladoselache =

Cladoselache Temporal range: Famennian

Extinct genus of cartilaginous fish

Cladoselache ("branch shark") is an extinct genus of shark-like cartilaginous fish from the Late Devonian (Famennian) of North America. It was similar in body shape to modern lamnid sharks (such as mako sharks and the great white shark), but was not closely related to lamnids or to any other modern (selachian) shark. As an early chondrichthyan, it had yet to evolve traits of modern sharks such as accelerated tooth replacement, a loose jaw suspension, enameloid teeth, and possibly claspers.

Some 20th century studies considered Cladoselache to be a basal (early-diverging) member of Elasmobranchii, the fork of cartilaginous fish which leads to modern sharks and rays. More recent studies have identified distinctive traits of the chondrocranium (cartilaginous braincase), dorsal fin spines, and pectoral fin bases. These newly identified features support a close relationship to symmoriiforms, a small group of bizarre chondrichthyans such as the bristle-spined Stethacanthus. Cladoselache and symmoriiforms may be more closely related to chimaeras (a modern group of unusual deep-sea fish) than to true sharks and rays.

Growing to several meters in length, Cladoselache is considered to have been a fast-moving and fairly agile marine predator due to its streamlined body and deeply forked tail. From both an anatomical and historical perspective, is one of the best known of the early chondrichthyans in part due to an abundance of well-preserved fossils, discovered in the Cleveland Shale on the south shore of Lake Erie. In addition to the cartilaginous skeleton, the fossils were so well preserved that they included traces of skin, muscle fibers, and internal organs, such as the kidneys.

== Description ==
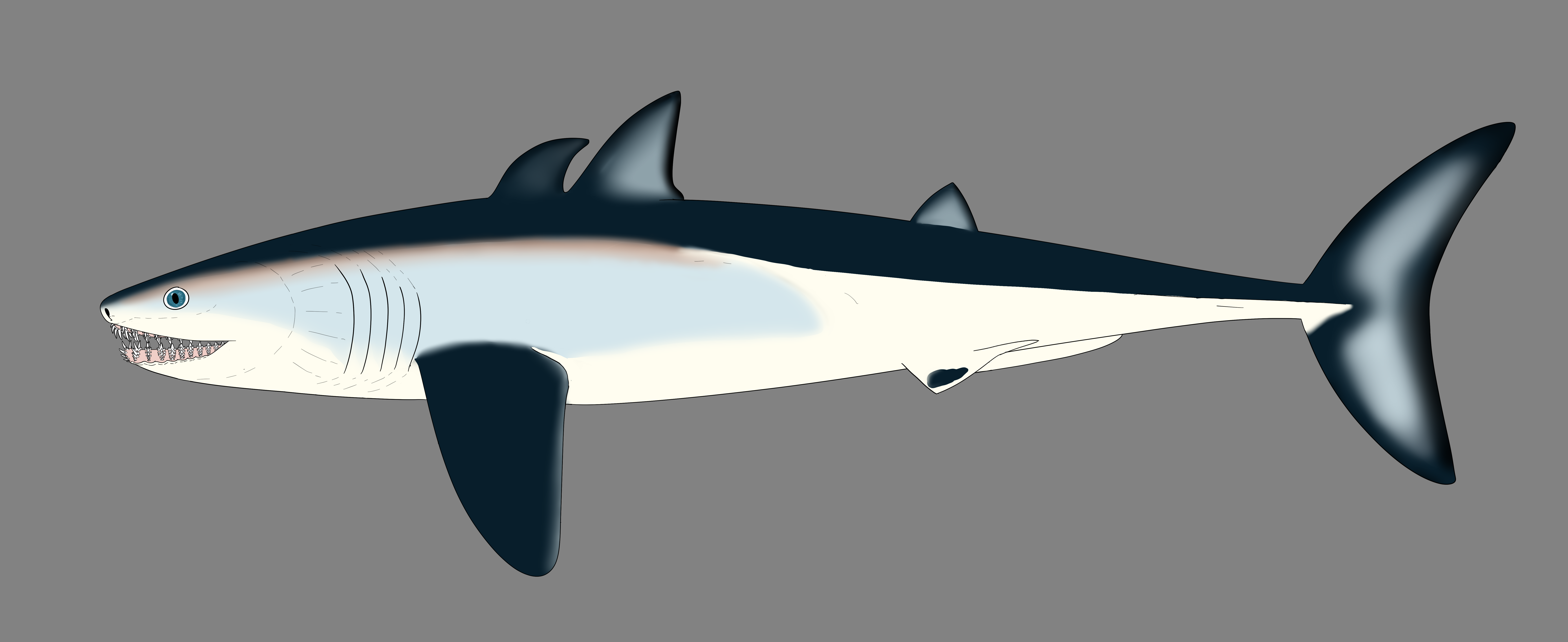
Life restoration of Cladoselache fyleri as a mako shark-like pelagic predator

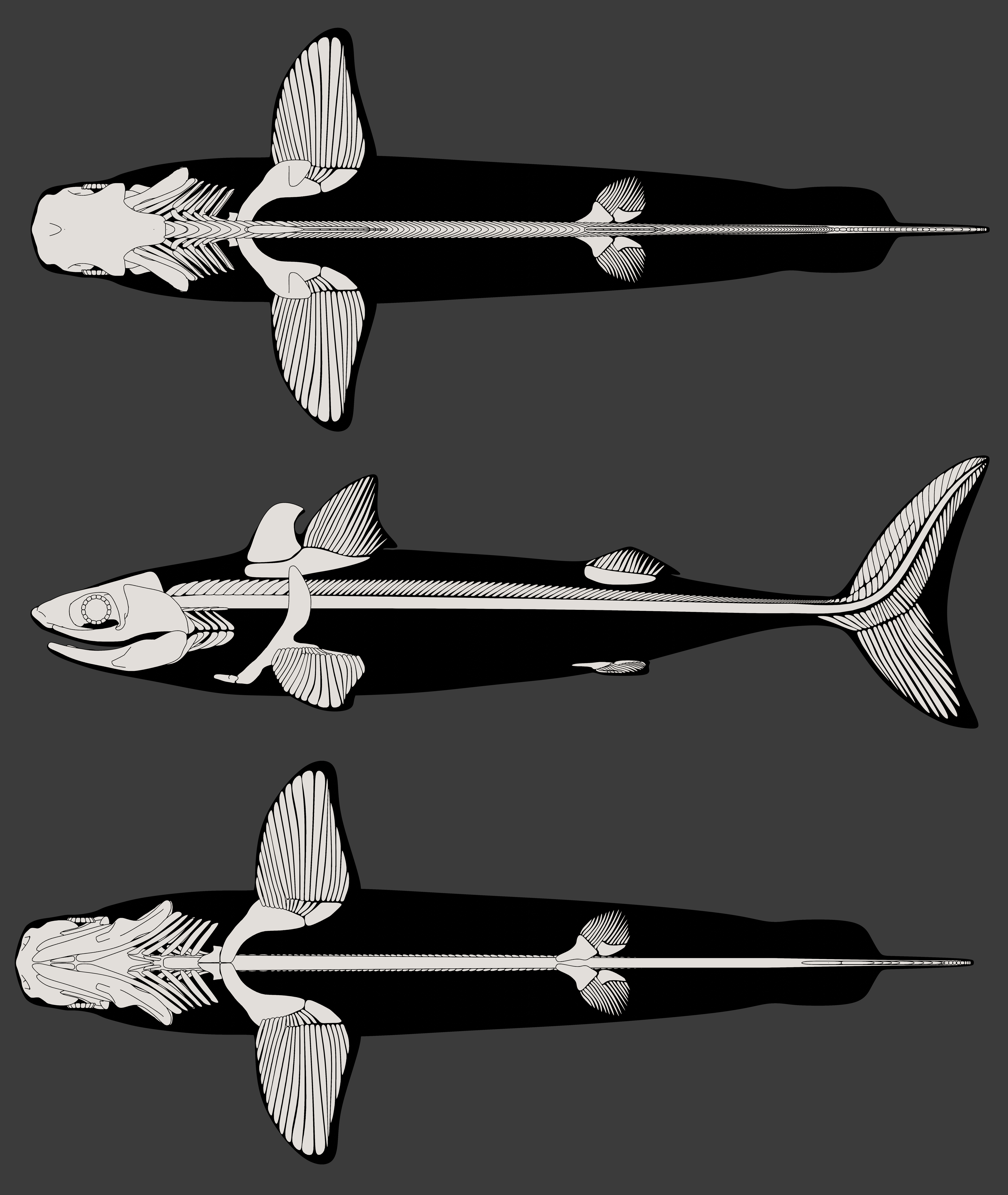
Skeletal diagram of Cladoselache fyleri in top-down view (top) side on (centre) and from below (bottom)

The anatomy of Cladoselache shows a mixture of derived and ancestral characteristics. The skeleton is composed of tessellated cartilage, a complex tissue unique to chondrichthyans. Tessellated cartilage combines flexible cartilage fibers with a loose mosaic of irregular calcified plates, known as tesserae.

The head shape of Cladoselache shares some similarities with modern frilled sharks, while its overall streamlined body shape is reminiscent of mackerel sharks in the family Lamnidae, which likely had a similar ecology. The largest undisputed skeleton of Cladoselache was about 2.0 meters (6.6 feet) in length, though many specimens were much smaller.

Like other chondrichthyans, the "skull" of Cladoselache consists of a central cranial cartilage protecting the brain and sensory organs (the chondrocranium, a cartilaginous equivalent of the neurocranium or braincase) alongside an upper and lower toothed jaw cartilage (the palatoquadrate and Meckel's cartilage, respectively). The eyes and nasal capsules were large and shifted forwards.

The gill basket is poorly known, but available evidence points towards the presence of at least five pairs of slender and well-separated branchial arches, and therefore five gill slits on either side of the body. Some early sources have suggested that six or even seven gill slits may have been present, though this has not been confirmed. The gill slits were separated by muscular flaps packed with fibrous overlapping gill filaments.

There are a pair of large pectoral fins behind the gills and low pelvic fins further back along the underside. Cladoselache has two dorsal fins, with the first being larger and preceded by a stout, curved fin spine. The caudal peduncle (tail) is tapered and keeled, ending at a crescent-shaped caudal fin.

=== Chondrocranium ===
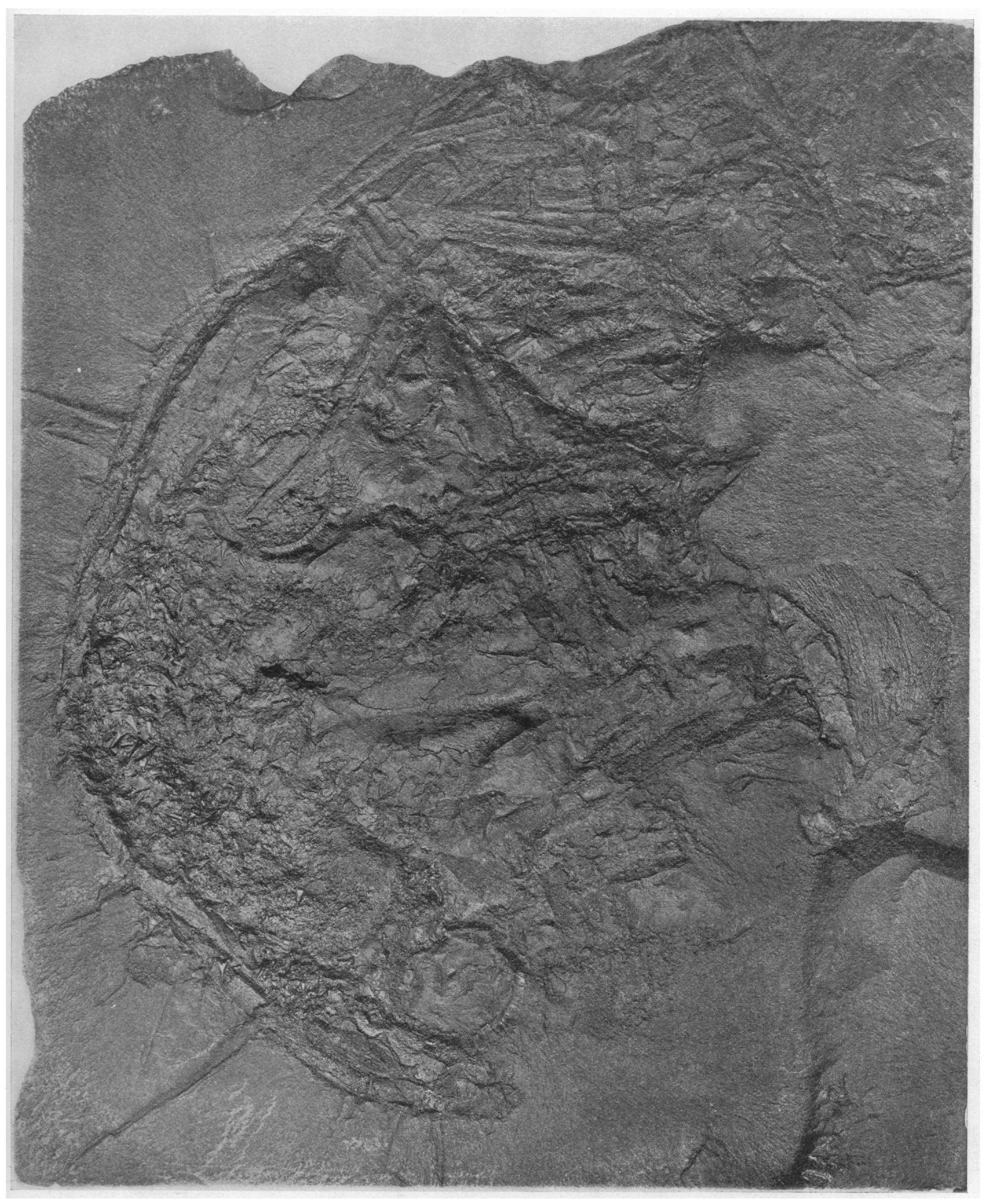
Crushed skull referred to C. kepleri, showing a flattened chondrocranium, teeth and scleral rings

The chondrocranium was low, with a broad and triangular sphenoid region (above and between the eyes) followed by a somewhat smaller otic region (above the hindbrain and balance organs). The ethmoid region (between the nostrils) at the front of the chondrocranium is unknown, but it was likely far shorter than the overhanging rostrum ("snout") of modern sharks. The underside of the chondrocranium is perforated by various nerve and blood vessel openings. A deep excavation is present at its rear tip, below the connection to the spinal column. This excavation contains a pair of closely spaced openings, where the two lateral branches of the dorsal aorta (a major artery) enter the braincase. Cladoselache's condition is intermediate between symmoriiforms (which have a single opening within the excavation) and other chondrichthyans (which have widely separated openings not confined to an excavation). Each branch of the dorsal aorta reemerges from the chondrocranium further forwards.

There are many other braincase traits shared between Cladoselache and symmoriiforms. The exits for the orbital arteries (which supply the eye and its vicinity with blood) are directly in front of the exits for the dorsal aortae. The postorbital process (which separates the eye socket from the ear region) is elongated (from side-to-side) and followed by a waisted area. A distinct notch develops on the outer edge of the wide supraorbital shelf (a plate which overhangs the eyes). However, in Cladoselache the exits for every branch of the facial nerve (nerve VII) are widely separated from the orbital arteries. This contrasts with symmoriiforms, in which some branches of the facial nerve are bundled with the orbital arteries in a groove or shared opening.

=== Jaws ===
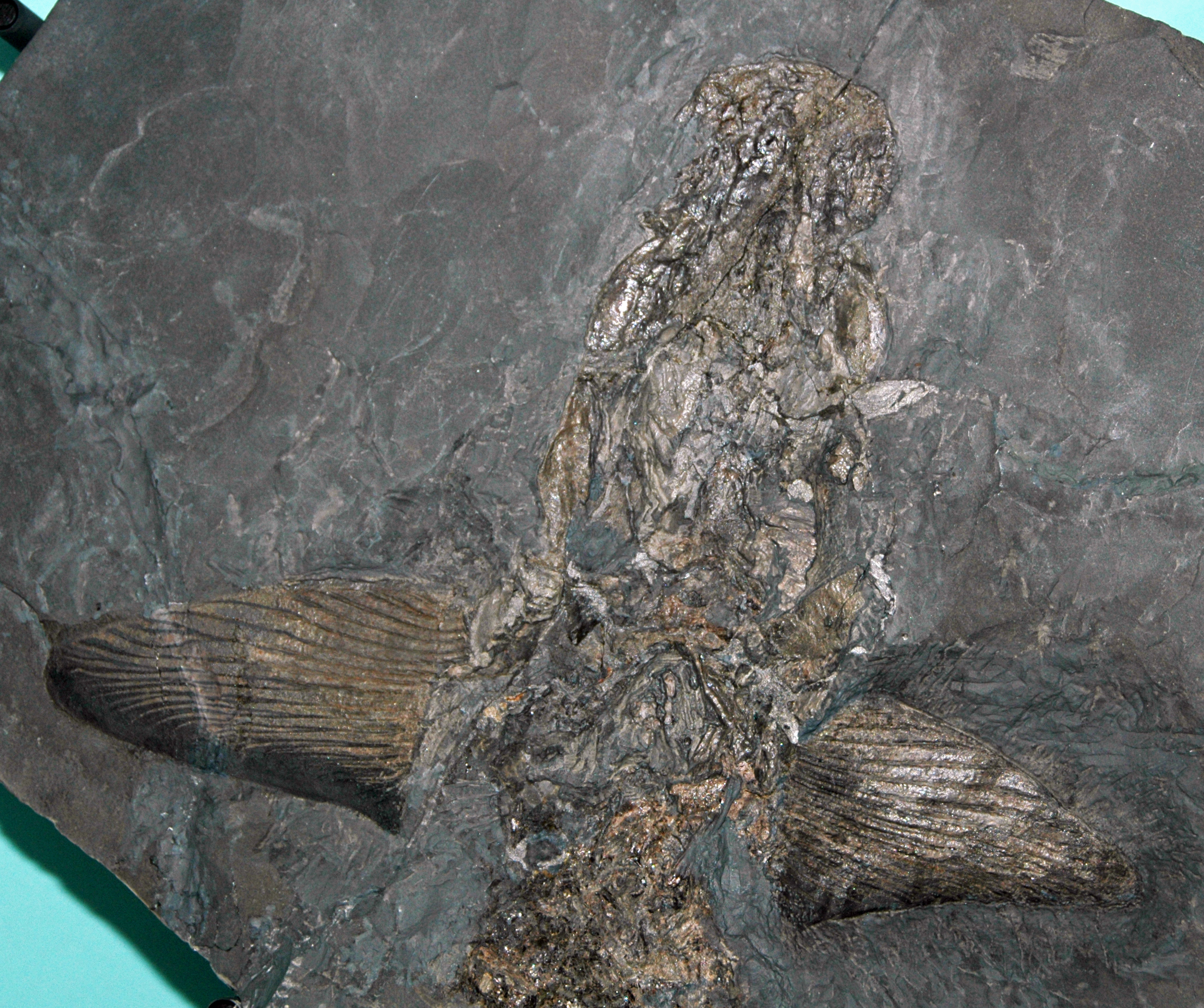
Skull and pectoral fins of a C. fyleri specimen on display in Cincinnati

The palatoquadrate and Meckel's cartilage were somewhat lightly built and hosted a series of transverse tooth rows sitting within scalloped grooves. Fossils reconstruct a terminal mouth (opening at the front of the head), similar to Chlamydoselachus (the modern frilled shark) but unlike other modern sharks. The joint between the upper and lower jaw is weakly connected, but facets for strong, sheet-like muscles can be found on the outer surface of the jaw. The otic process (rear portion) of the palatoquadrate expands upwards to articulate with the postorbital process of the chondrocranium. The palatine ramus (front portion) also expands to a lesser extent, presumably articulating with the ethmoid region of the chondrocranium. A similar two-point articulation is also found in xenacanthid sharks. The rear edge of the palatoquadrate would have been braced by the rod-shaped hyomandibula. With stable connections to both the chondrocranium and the hyomandibula, the jaw suspension of Cladoselache can be classified as amphistyly. Amphistyly is common in early chondrichthyans, but it is only present in hexanchiforms (frilled and sixgill sharks) among modern members of the group. Most modern sharks and rays have a looser jaw suspension which only involves the hyomandibula (a condition known as hyostyly). Chimaeras, on the other hand, have a palatoquadrate fused to the chondrocranium (known as holostyly).

=== Teeth ===
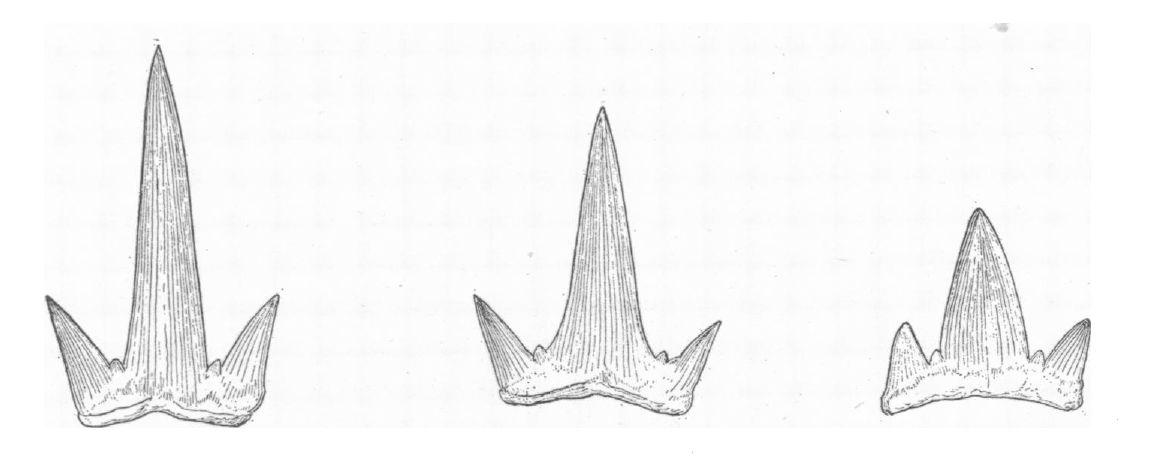
Teeth of C. fyleri

Like many other early chondrichthyans, Cladoselache had "cladodont" teeth, with a large and sharp central cusp surrounded by one or two pairs of smaller cusps. The median (central) cusp has a flat labial face (the side facing the cheek), in contrast to other "cladodonts" which had a convex labial face. The root of the tooth is broad and has a deeply arched concavity on its underside (known as a basiolabial depression), which is flanked by triangular projections. Teeth at the front of the mouth were generally taller, with a long median cusp and two pairs of small and pointed lateral cusps, with the outer pair larger than the inner pair. Further back, the median cusp becomes shorter and the inner pair of lateral cusps shrink into oblivion, leaving only the outer pair. The teeth are thickly layered with typical dentine, but lack enamel (the hypercrystalline outer layering of osteichthyan teeth) or enameloid (an enamel-like form of dentine in shark teeth).

Cladoselache was one of the earliest vertebrates known to have had shark-like tooth replacement, with a series of widely spaced tooth rows constantly unfurling new teeth outward. There were around seven to nine closely packed teeth per tooth row, and about eleven or twelve rows arranged from front to back on each palatoquadrate. The oldest, outermost teeth in each row were smaller than newly formed teeth further inwards, suggesting that tooth replacement was slow enough to keep pace with the animal's overall rate of growth. This is supported by the presence of worn surfaces on some teeth, indicating prolonged tooth retention.

=== Postcrania and fins ===
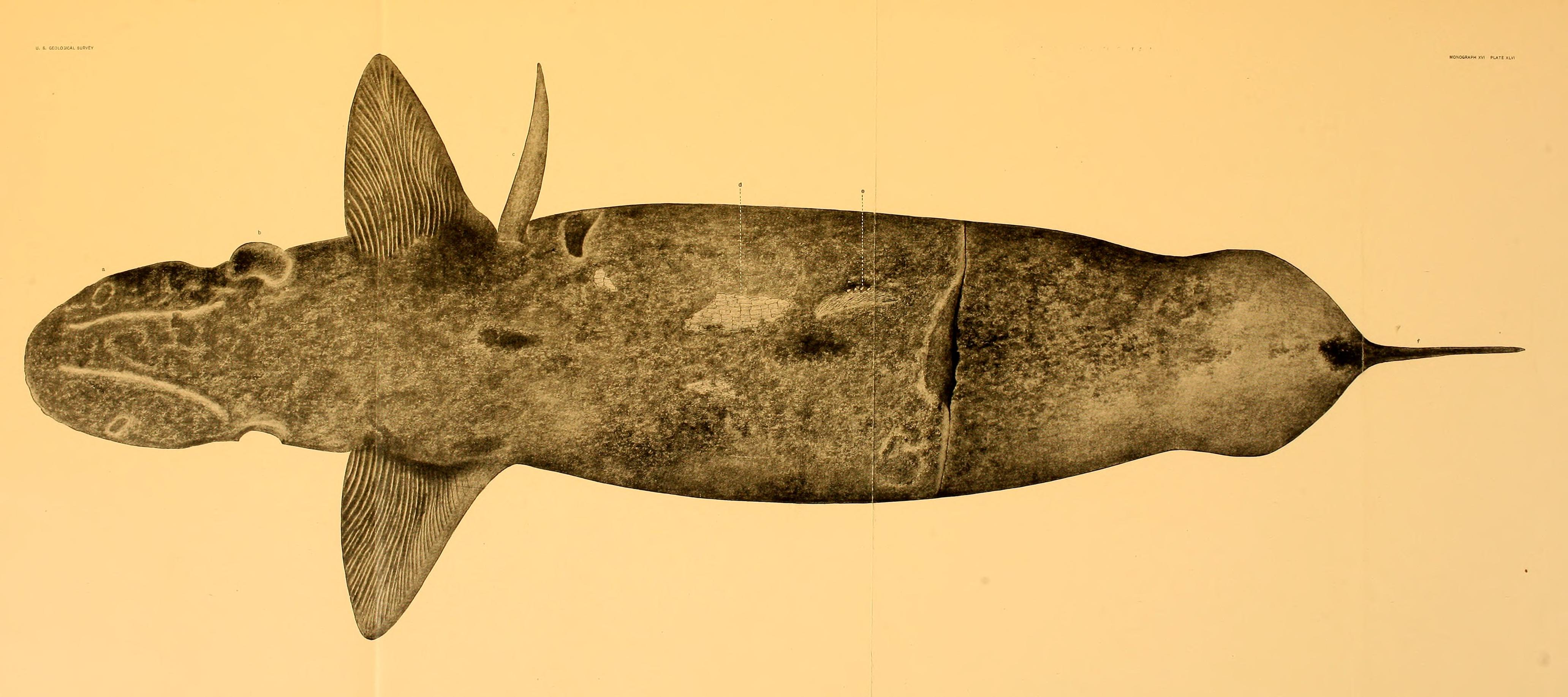
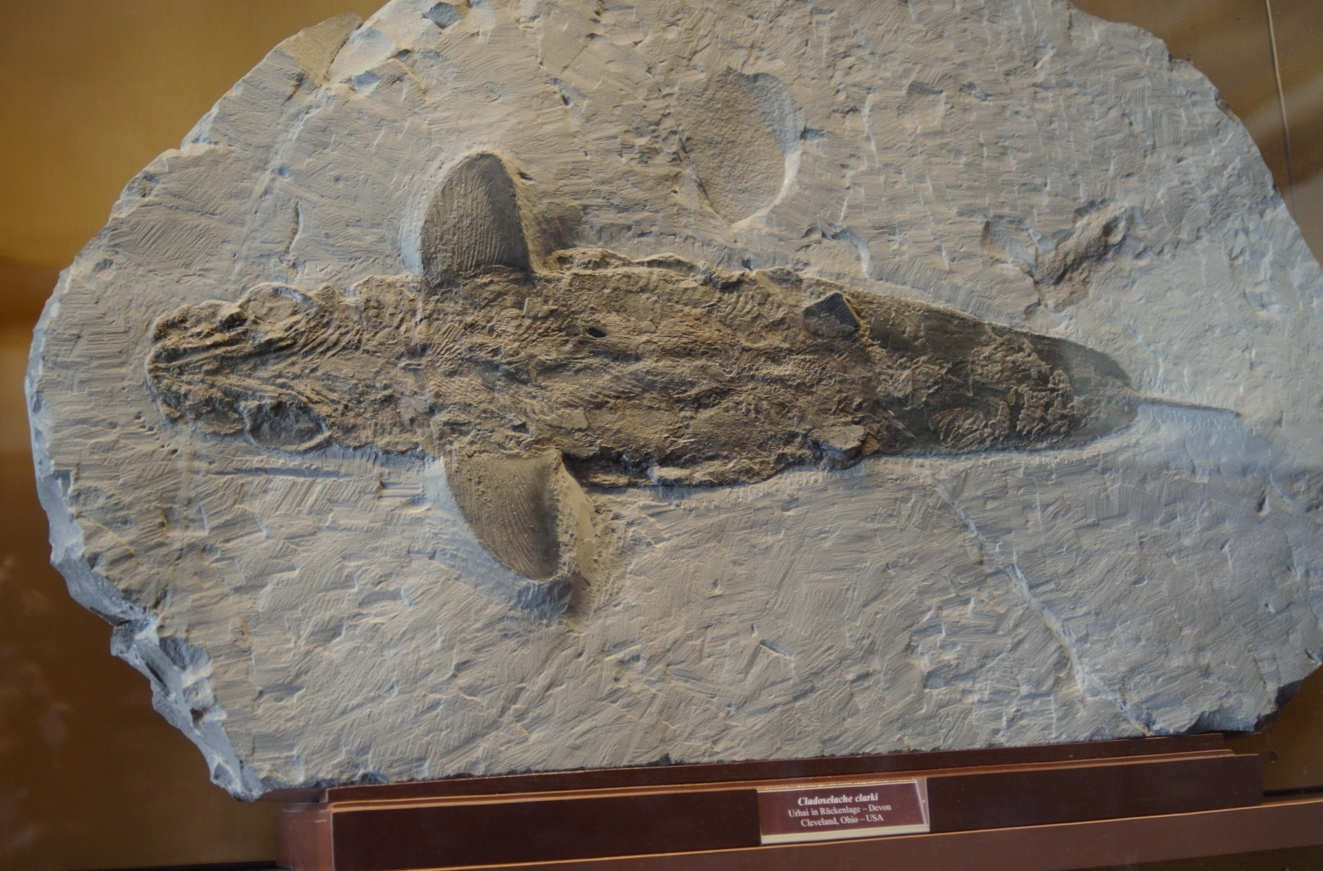
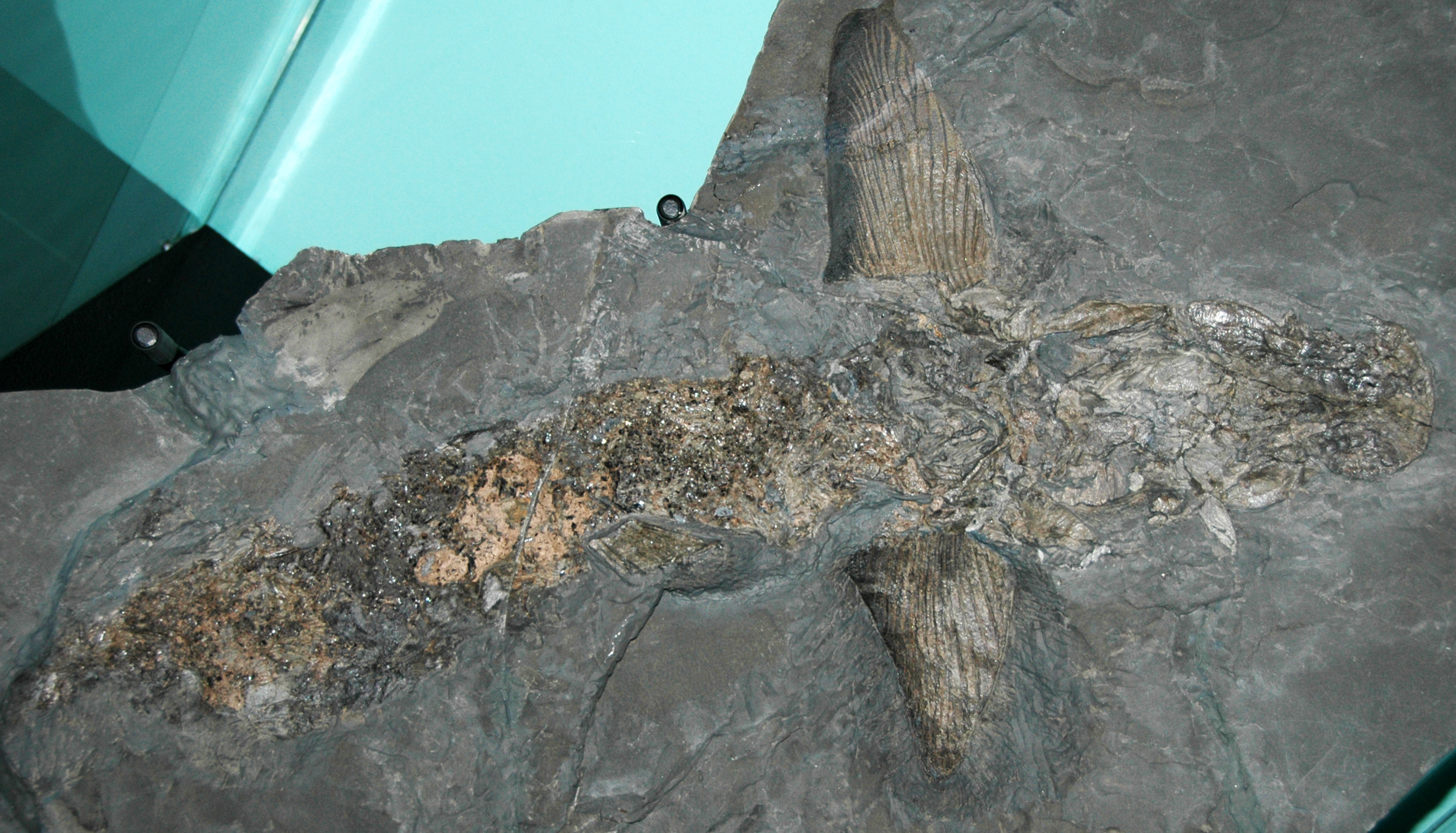
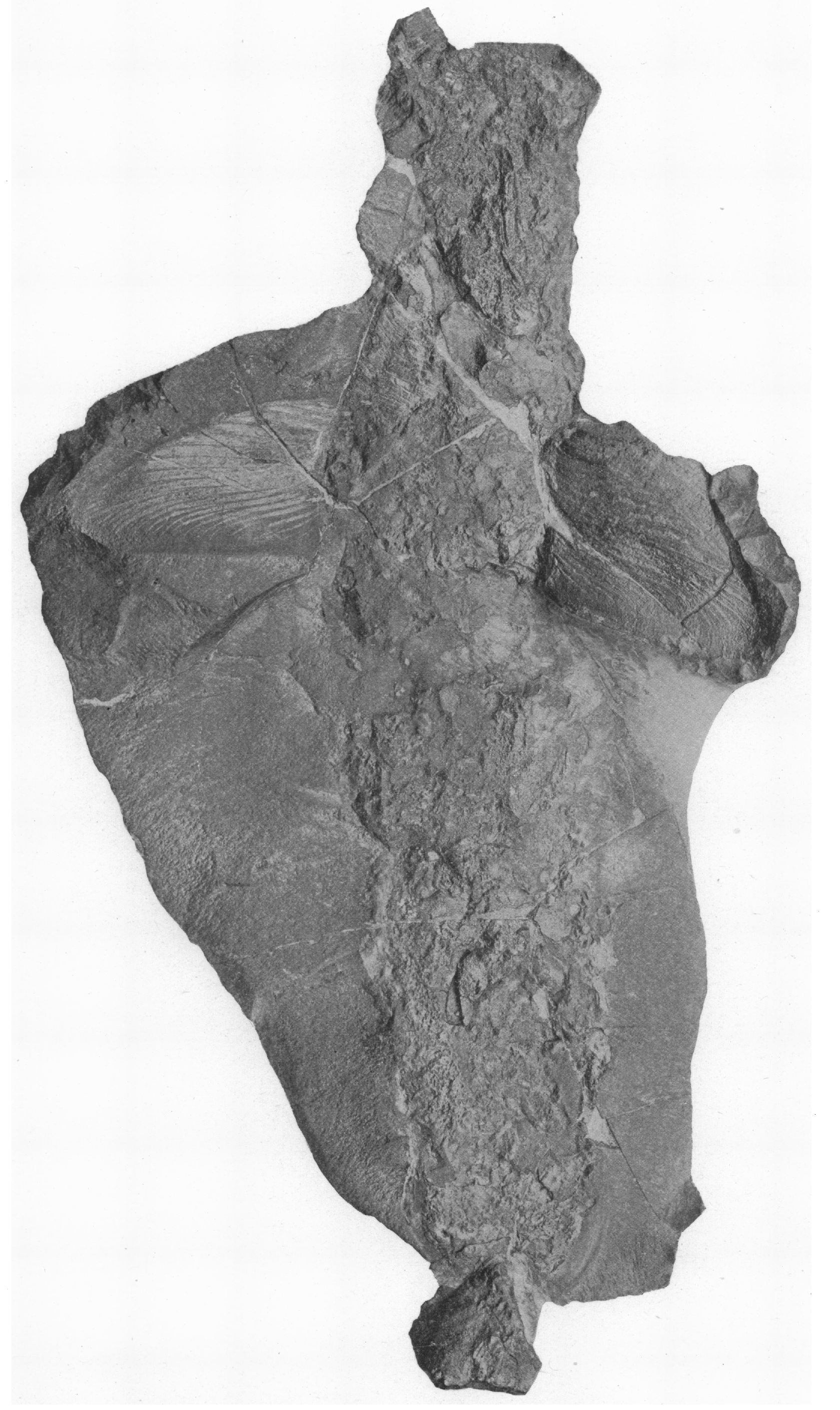
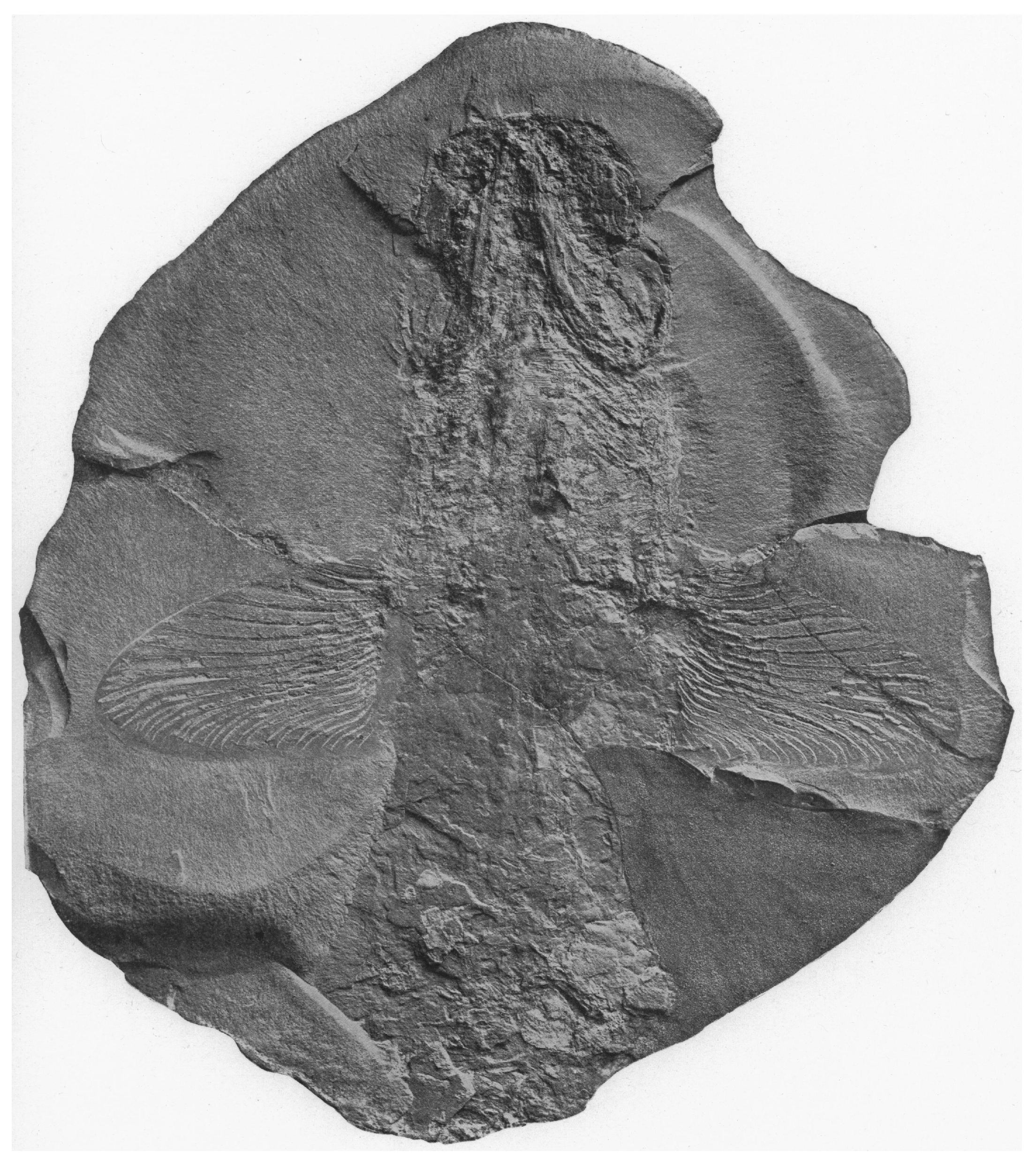
Various Cladoselache specimens, from top to bottom:
- A complete C. fyleri
- A cast of C. clarki on display in Vienna
- A complete C. fyleri on display in Cincinnati
- A complete C. desmopterygius
- A partial C. kepleri

The spinal column of Cladoselache was cartilaginous and poorly preserved, without calcified centra (spool-shaped main components) encompassing the notochord. Typically only the pointed, closely spaced neural arches can be observed in fossils. All of the fins (except the caudal fin) have the same basic structure: a wide base which is continuous with the torso, and a subtriangular profile supported along nearly the whole length of the fin by cartilaginous rods known as radials. Only a few radials are segmented, with thicker radials concentrated at the front of each fin and thinner radials concentrated further back.

The pectoral fin is large and elongated, connecting to a strong and broad pectoral girdle. A tall scapula projects a fair distance upwards from the base of each pectoral fin. The innermost cartilage in the pectoral girdle are the procoracoids, a pair of L-shaped structures also found in most other Paleozoic chondrichthyans. Each connects outwards to a wing-shaped coracoid plate which forms the base of the pectoral fin. The front half of the pectoral fin consists of eleven radials (slender fin components) which attach directly to the coracoid plate. The first six are long and unsegmented while the following five are segmented, separated into a short inner portion (proximal radials) and a longer outer portion (distal radials). In the rear half of the pectoral fin, a triangular cartilaginous structure, the metapterygium, expands out from the rear of the coracoid plate. More than six particularly slender radials attach to the metapterygium. Many traits of Cladoselache's pectoral girdle are characteristic of symmoriiforms, including large paired procoracoids, proximal radials, and a distinct metapterygium at the rear of the coracoid. Cladoselache also has a unique trait when compared to other Paleozoic chondrichthyans: the rear edge of the metapterygium does not send out a string of small cartilage structures known as axials.

The pelvic fins are small and low, about three times longer (from front-to-back) than high. Their backswept radials connect to rows of basals (small linking structures), which are embedded into the torso above each pelvic fin. Basals are also present below the dorsal fins. A pair of pointed rod-like structures, which appear to be an early form of pelvic girdle, project forwards from each row of pelvic basals. Claspers have never been found in Cladoselache, despite their presence in close relatives and even other Devonian chondrichthyans. This may be due to its reduced pelvic region, a reliance on external fertilization, or simply a lack of male fossils preserving the area. Cladoselache appears to lack an anal fin. However, the underside of the tail stalk encased six pairs of forward-swept radial-like structures, with the first pair being particularly large. These structures, which may be homologous to the unpaired anal fin, extend as far back as the base of the caudal fin.

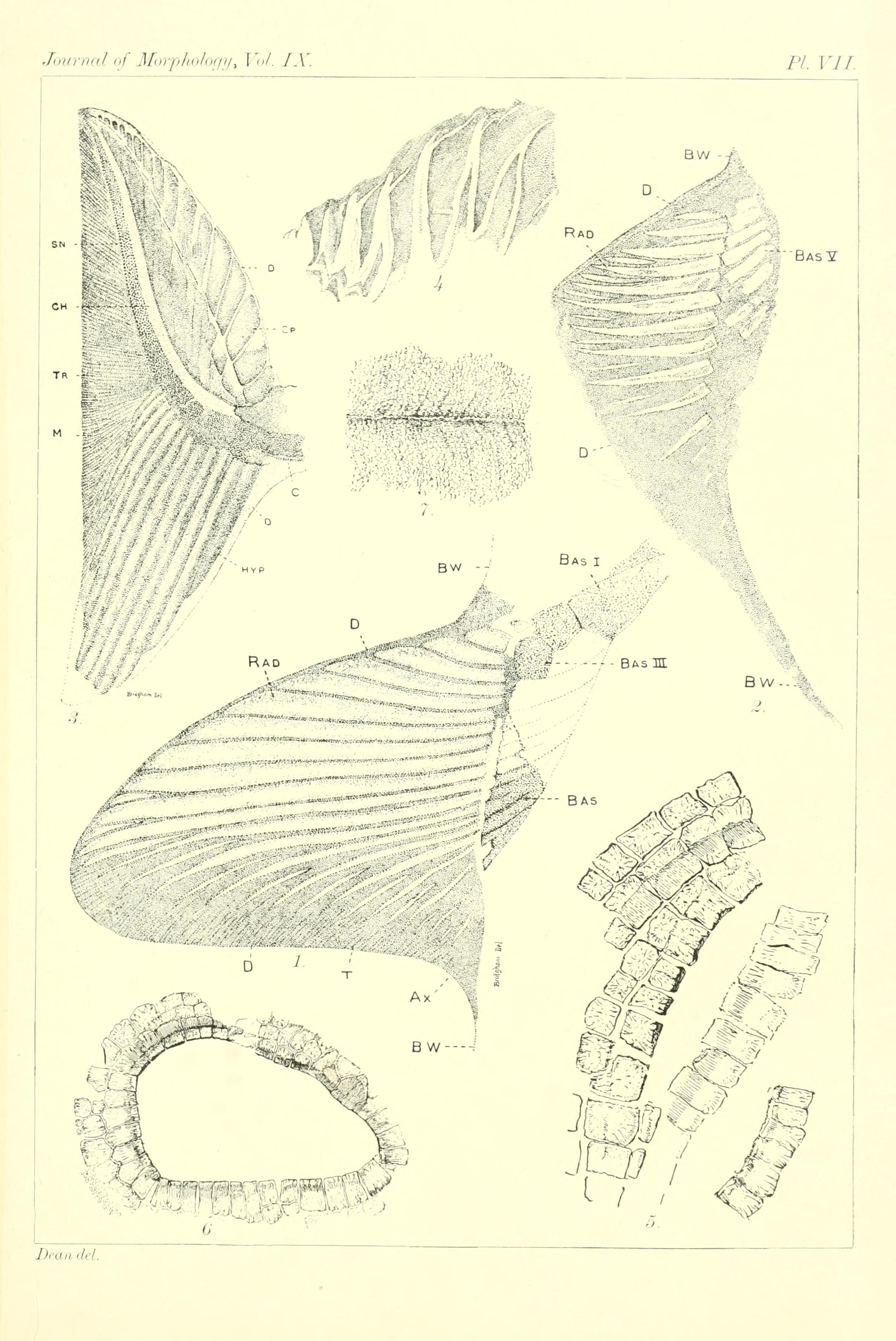
Illustrations from 1894 showing skeletal elements such as fins (1-4), scleral ossicles (5-6), and a lateral line (7)

The caudal fin is distinctive, with a very tall and lunate (crescent moon-shaped) profile extending from a narrow tail base. A similar tail shape is also seen in Xiphias (the modern swordfish) and symmoriiforms. The notochord is upturned at nearly a right angle, continuing to the tip of the upper lobe of the fin. The upper lobe is composed of several rows of cartilage plates, known as epurals. The largest epurals lie furthest from the notochord, forming a sharp front edge to the upper lobe. The lower lobe is reinforced by at least a dozen thick radials. It is uncertain whether these radials attach directly to the notochord, or whether basals serve that purpose. The rear edge of the fin is merely composed of a web of dermal fibers. On either side of the caudal peduncle (tail stalk) is a broad fold or keel, which helps to stabilize the tail. When seen from above, the tail stalk nearly appears rectangular due to these keels.

There are two dorsal fins: the first dorsal fin is located above the pectoral fins and is significantly taller than the second dorsal fin, which is located above the pelvic fins. Cladoselache was initially considered to lack fin spines, unlike most prehistoric sharks. However, a stout spine-like structure is now known to have been present in front of the first dorsal fin, according to specimens which were first described in 1938. The dorsal fin spine was recurved and nearly as long (from front-to-back) as it was tall, in contrast to the far more slender spines of ctenacanthiforms and other chondrichthyans. There is no ornamentation apart from randomly oriented furrows which extend over its entire area. The base of the spine was probably only shallowly implanted into the skin, and not closely appressed to the succeeding dorsal fin. The fin spine slots onto a plate of calcified cartilage, which is gilded with layers of bone-like cellular and acellular dentine. This internal structure is most similar to the sexually dimorphic spine brush complex of symmoriiforms, rather than the enamel-coated fin spines of other sharks. While another cladoselachid Maghriboselache had fin spine in front of both dorsal fins, for Cladoselache the presence of a fin spine in front of the second dorsal is uncertain, it is considered to be hypothetically present or absent.

== Classification ==
Cladoselache is considered one of the best-known early members of the Chondrichthyes: cartilaginous fish such as sharks, rays, and the deep-sea chimaeras (also known as ratfish or ghostsharks). Though it resembles modern sharks (selachians) in ecology and body shape, it is not a member of that group, which did not evolve until the Jurassic Period. When first described near the end of the 19th century, Cladoselache was immediately recognized as a plesiomorphic (ancestral) form of cartilaginous fish, and not closely related to modern sharks despite its similar appearance. Cladoselache is often called the "earliest shark" in broad ecological definitions of the term, though it is only distantly related to modern sharks. It and other Paleozoic "sharks" may instead be described as basal chondrichthyans, a term indicating their origin at an earlier stage in cartilaginous fish evolution. A shark-like body form is considered to be ancestral to chondrichthyans as a whole, even for groups like rays and chimaeras, which are not considered sharks in a colloquial sense.

Chondrichthyes splits into two branches early in the evolution of the group. One branch, known as Holocephali or Euchondrocephali, was far more diverse in the Paleozoic, but is only represented in the modern day by the rare chimaeras (Chimaeriformes). The other branch, Elasmobranchii, is much more diverse in the present, including modern sharks (Selachii), rays (Batoidea), and their extinct relatives. Some older studies use the terms shark, elasmobranch and chondrichthyan interchangeably, though this is not common in more recent work.

=== Traditional interpretations ===
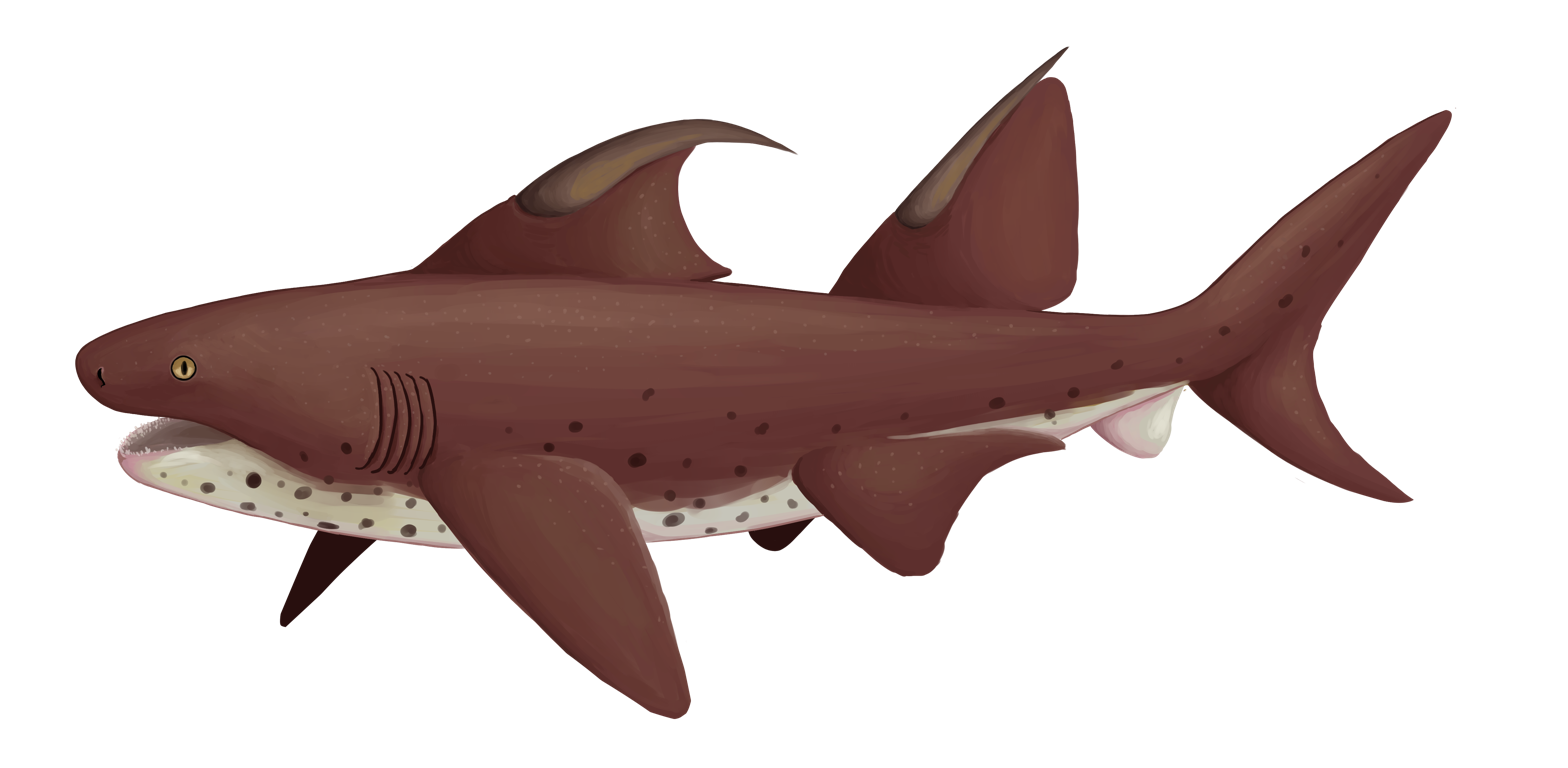
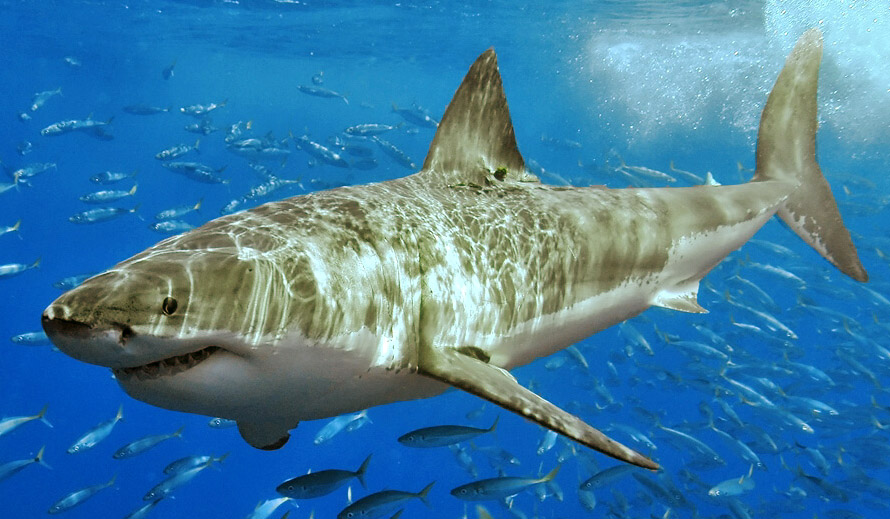
Cladoselache has traditionally been placed close to or within Elasmobranchii, a subgroup of chondrichthyans including ctenacanthiforms (Dracopristis, left) and neoselachians (great white shark, right), among others

The earliest publications regarding the genus noted that both Cladoselache and acanthodians ("spiny sharks") were close to the base of "Elasmobranchii" (Chondrichthyes), but also that both taxa carried unusual specializations relative to the estimated ancestral condition. Cladoselache and Acanthodii were allied under the now-antiquated group Pleuropterygii, according to proposed plesiomorphic traits such as scleral rings, flap-like paired fins, a reinforced upper tail lobe, and the supposed lack of claspers. Pleuropterygii was later expanded to incorporate ctenacanthids and symmoriids, which were similar to Cladoselache in geological age, cladodont tooth shape, and general anatomy. The later discovery of dorsal spines in Cladoselache supported the idea that Cladoselache, ctenacanths, and hybodonts formed a series of forms incrementally more "advanced" towards modern sharks.

The position of Cladoselache as an early chondrichthyan near ctenacanths and other cladodont "sharks" was generally unchallenged in the 20th century. Most disagreements related to precisely how early Cladoselache branched off from the rest of the chondrichthyan family tree. Some studies argued that it was the earliest-diverging member of the group, while others placed it as an elasmobranch, originating slightly later than the holocephalans. A few studies even suggested that it was a more derived elasmobranch close to hybodonts and neoselachians (modern sharks and rays), though this was an uncertain and unstable position. Several accounts in the 1980s drew comparisons between Cladoselache and the enigmatic eugeneodonts, based on the shape and structure of the tail.

=== Relation to symmoriiforms and holocephalans ===
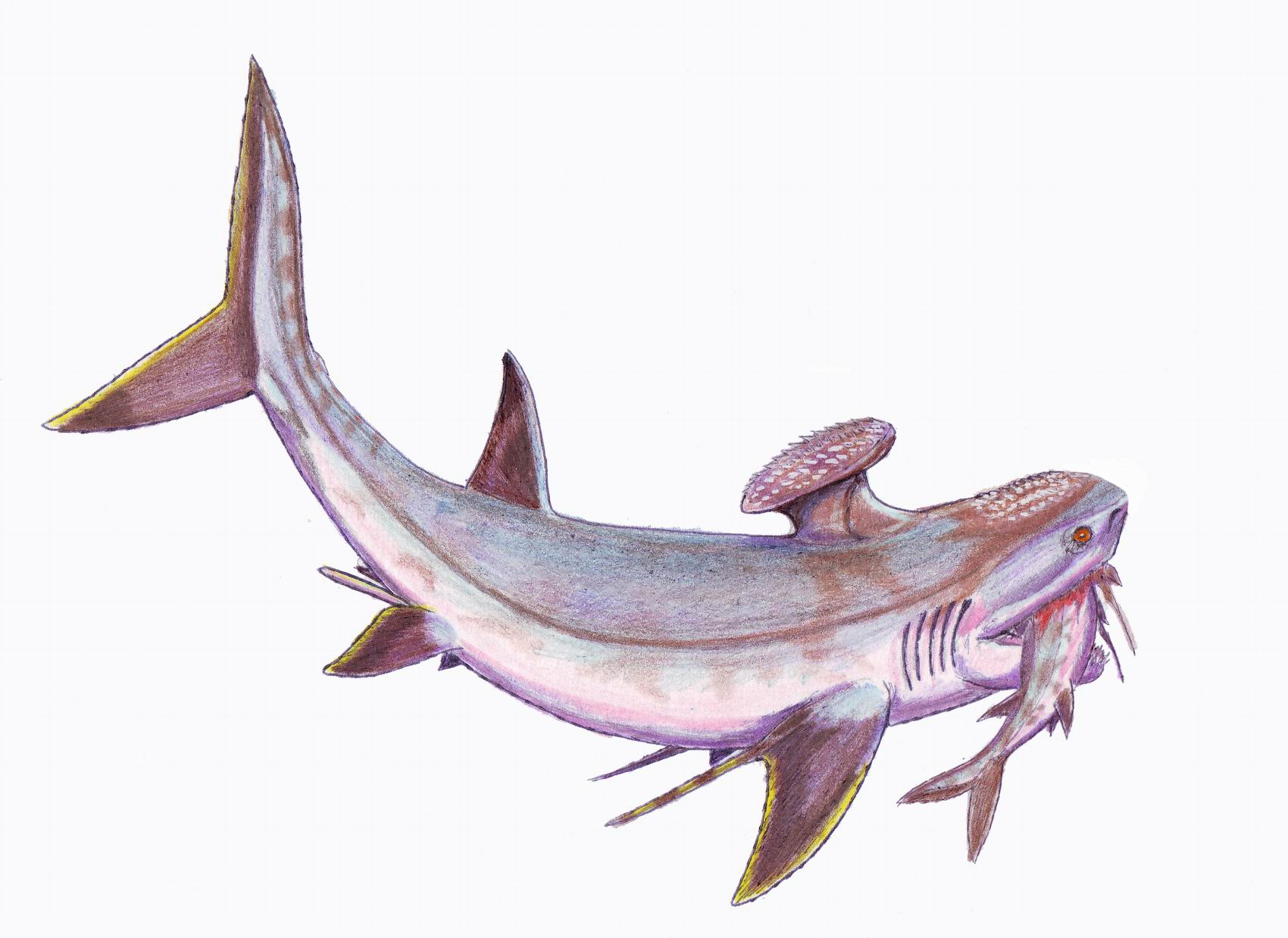
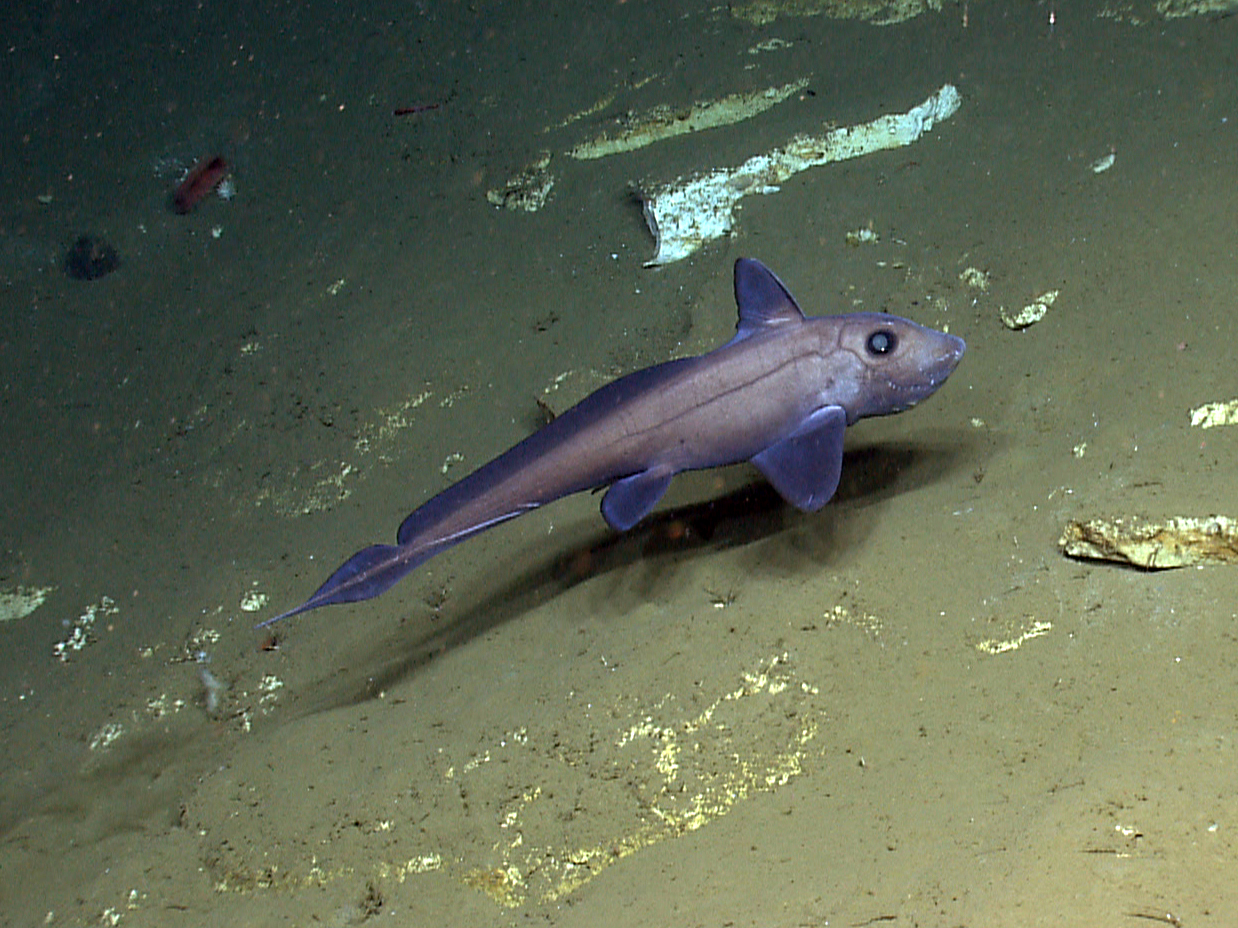
Numerous traits have connected Cladoselache to symmoriiforms (Stethacanthus, left) in recent studies. They may belong to the stem group of Holocephali, the branch of chondrichthyans leading to the modern deep-sea chimaeras (Chimaera sp., right)

More recent information on Cladoselache's anatomy has led many authors to propose close relations between Cladoselache and symmoriiforms such as Stethacanthus and Falcatus. The dorsal spine of Cladoselache appears to be homologous to the unusual head structures prevalent in symmoriiforms, and many similarities are also present in the braincase and pectoral region. Symmoriiforms and Cladoselache may form an early-diverging clade at the base of Chondrichthyes or Elasmobranchii, similar to traditional interpretations of their affinities.

However, an alternative hypothesis has caught traction: Symmoriiforms (including Cladoselache) may lie on the opposite side of Chondrichthyes, as an early part of the holocephalan stem-group which would eventually produce modern chimaeras. This hypothesis was originally supported by certain tentative features (reduced scalation, absent second dorsal fin spine), and later stabilized further by braincase-related traits such as an arched midbrain and large orbits.

Cladogram based on the phylogenetic analysis of Frey et al., 2020. Major groups are bolded:

- **Chondrichthyes**
  - Gladbachus
  - - - Gydoselache
      - Pucapampella
    - - Doliodus
      - - **Holocephali**
          - **Symmoriiformes**
            - **Cladoselache**
            - - Ozarcus
              - - Dwykaselachus
                - - - Ferromirum
                    - Gutturensis
                  - - Cobelodus
                    - - Akmonistion
                      - Damocles
          - - - Iniopera
              - Kawichthys
            - - Helodus
              - - Debeerius
                - - Chondrenchelys
                  - **Chimaeroidei** (chimaeras)
        - **Elasmobranchii** (true sharks, rays, and kin)

== Palaeobiology ==
The teeth of Cladoselache were slender and smooth-edged, making them suitable for grasping, but not tearing or chewing. Members of the genus were predators, and the well-preserved fossils found in the Cleveland Shale revealed a significant amount regarding their eating habits. Within the gut of most Cladoselache fossils were remnants of their stomach contents. These remains included mostly small ray-finned bony fishes ("Kentuckia" hlavini which is probably not belonging to genus Kentuckia), as well as thylacocephalan arthropods (Concavicaris) and conodonts, hagfish-like proto-vertebrates. Some of the fish remains were found tail first within the stomach, indicating that Cladoselache was a fast and agile hunter.

A mystery that has yet to be resolved is its method of reproduction. Cladoselache is not known to possess claspers, organs found in modern sharks that are responsible for the transfer of sperm during reproduction. This is peculiar given that most other early shark fossils show evidence of claspers. While they may have used internal fertilization, this has yet to be demonstrated.

=== Scales and soft tissue ===
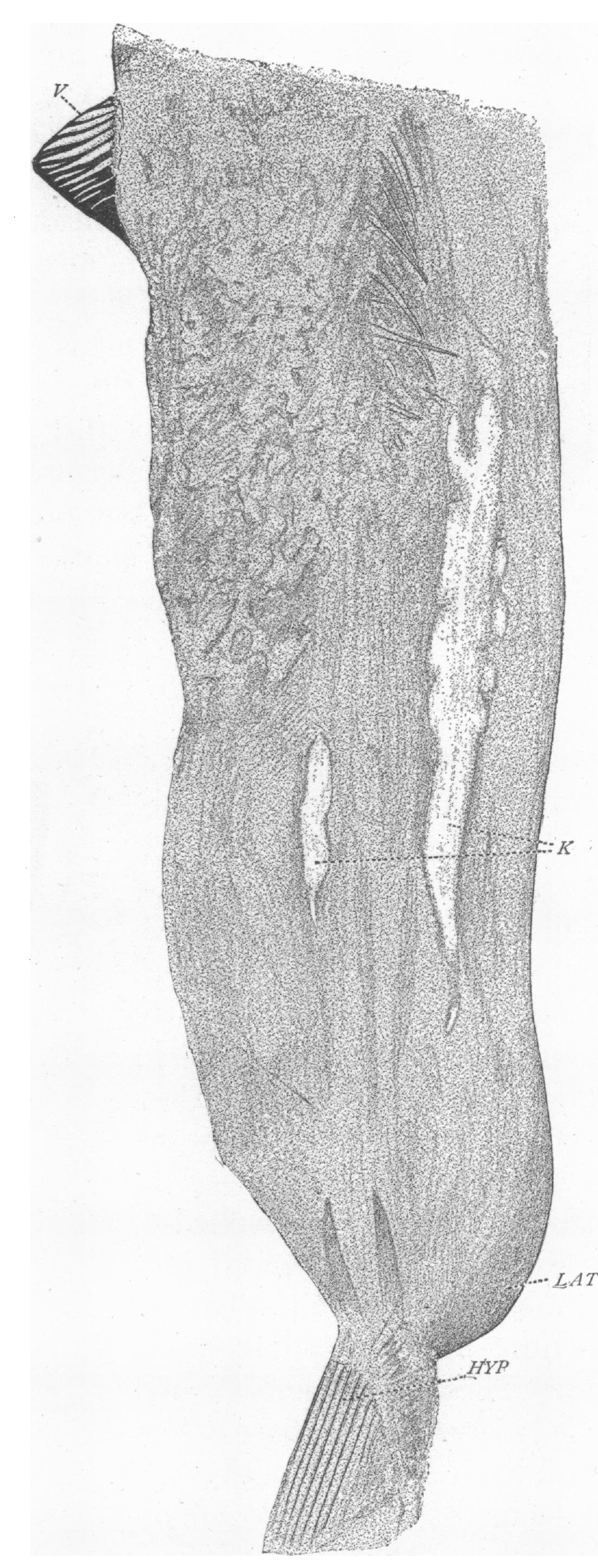
Specimen showing supposed kidneys under the caudal peduncle

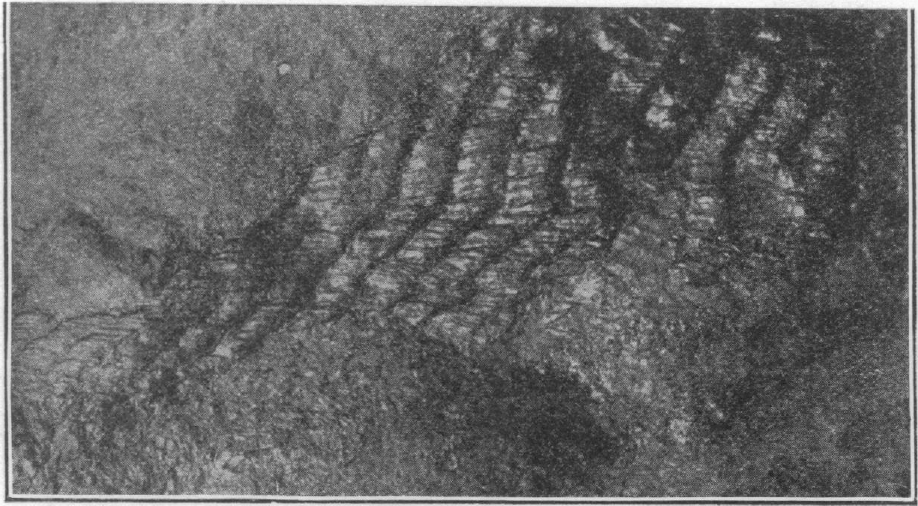
Blocks of muscle fibers visible in one specimen

Placoid scales (denticles) were present in Cladoselache, but they are tiny and bluntly conical structures which are absent from much of the body. Larger denticles occur on fin margins and adjacent to the lateral line, while three-cusped scales are found along the margin of the jaw. The denticles have an internal structure of pulp cavity pockets encased by fused dentine. The eye was protected by a ring of numerous (more than 20) small dermal ossifications, which were initially interpreted as denticles with a function similar to modern scleral ossicles. However, they were later reinterpreted as true scleral ossicles, akin to the scleral rings of densely-packed ossicles seen in Falcatus and Damocles. Scleral rings are present in many modern osteichthyans (bony fish and tetrapods), but modern sharks only retain a cup-like structure of calcified cartilage.

The exceptional preservational conditions of the Cleveland Shale allow insights into soft-tissue structures such as organs and muscles, which are not typically preserved in fossils. A pair of long organs were present between the pelvic fins and the caudal fin. These organs were packed with small tubules, and may represent kidneys, despite their unusual position. This suggests that the body cavity of Cladoselache (including the digestive and urinary systems) extends further back into the caudal peduncle relative to modern sharks. Gut content and coprolites are strongly twisted, arguing that the digestive system of Cladoselache was similar to living sharks. The musculature of Cladoselache is organized into discrete packages of muscle fibers, which are easier to differentiate than those of modern sharks.

== Sources ==
- Ferrari, Andrea; Ferrari, Antonella (2002). Sharks. Buffalo: Firefly Books.
- Maisey, John. G. (June 1998). "Voracious Evolution". Natural History. 107 (5): 38–41.
