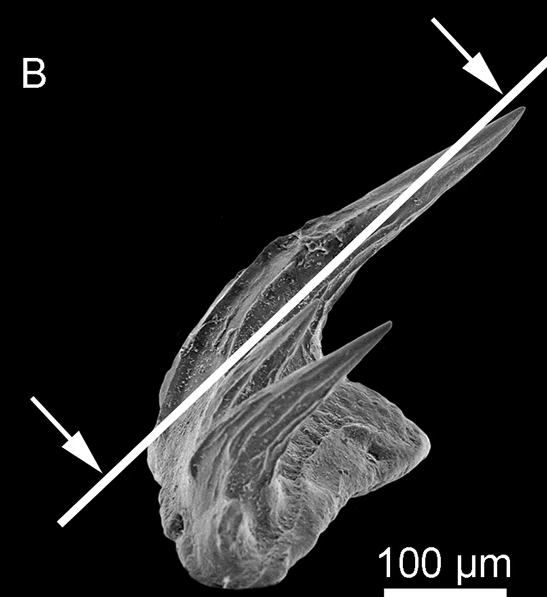
- Holotype tooth of Cretacladoides noricum

Scientific classification
- Kingdom: Animalia
- Phylum: Chordata
- Class: Chondrichthyes
- Genus: †Cretacladoides; Feichtinger et al. 2018

Type species
- †Cretacladoides ogiveformis Feichtinger et al., 2018

Species
- †C. ogiveformis (Feichtinger et al., 2018); †C. noricum (Feichtinger et al., 2018)

= Cretacladoides =

Cretacladoides Temporal range: Valanginian

Extinct genus of fish

Cretacladoides ("cladodont likeness from the Cretaceous") is a genus of chondrichthyan, possibly a falcatid, found in France and Austria. Known solely from teeth, mainly found in the Klausrieglerbach locality of Austria, it consists of two species, C. ogiveformis and C. noricum. Assuming a falcatid identity, it is the most recent member of the family, which otherwise became extinct at the end of the Carboniferous.

== History of discovery ==
The teeth of Cretacladoides were discovered on a field trip by palaeontologist Alexander Lukeneder in 2012. The limestone in which it was found yielded a diverse tooth assemblage, and was dissolved in acetic acid so they could be extracted. In total, 7 kg of limestone contained roughly 88 diagnosable teeth, including 41 teeth that undoubtedly belonged to elasmobranchs. While some of these had been described in a prior paper, the others were mounted on stubs, coated with gold and scanned with an electron microscope at the Palaeontological Department of the University of Vienna.

The generic name of Cretacladoides is a combination of the words Cretaceous, cladodont, and the Greek word "εἶδος" (oides) which means "similar," or "likeness," alluding to its age and similarities to the teeth of Palaeozoic cladodontomorph chondrichthyans.

== Description ==
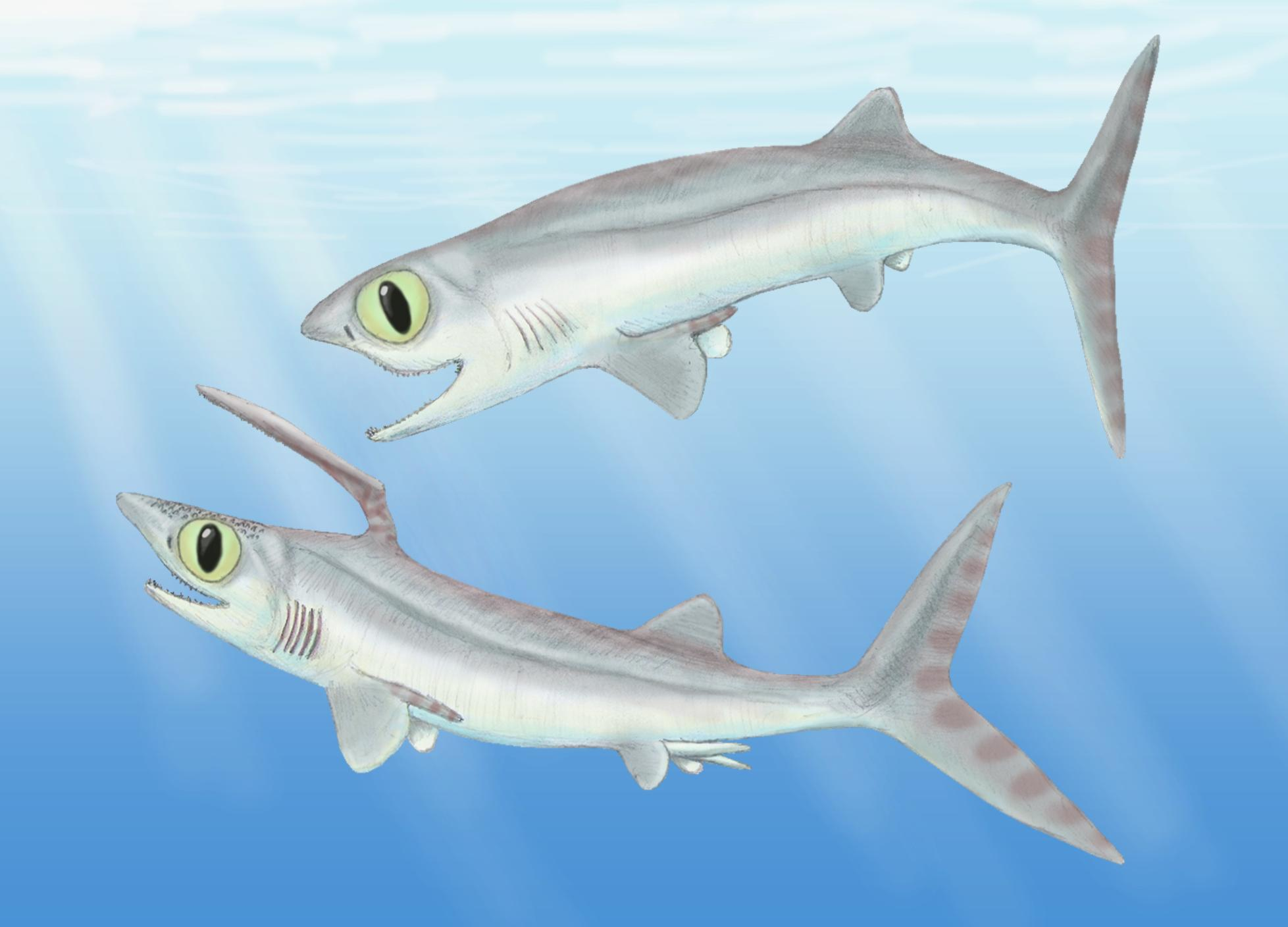
Life restorations of Falcatus, which Cretacladoides may have resembled.

The teeth of Cretacladoides are multicuspid in structure, with a cladodont-like crown, and measure less than 1 millimetre (0.10 cm) in width and height. The main cusp is triangular, and flanked by either two or three pairs of lateral cusplets. The first pair of cusplets is very small, while the second reaches three quarters of the main cusp's height. The third pair, when present, is roughly half the size of the second pair. The cutting edges are apparently continuous between the apex of the main cusps and the cusplets. In profile view, all cusps are inclined inwards. The labial crown face possesses either an ogive-shaped enameloid structure on the main cusp, or two converging ridges, depending on which tooth it is.

Viewed from the base, the root is D-shaped, possessing a small labial budge beneath the main cusp. From a lingual view, the root face has a well-developed protuberance below the main cusp. One pair of foramina opens laterally to this protuberance, while the second pair is below a notch which separates the second and third lateral cusplets. The aboral root face possesses two foramina, one central to the root face and the other in line with the main cusp towards the mouth.

== Palaeoecology ==
The Klausrieglerbach locality is known to have had at least three other named chondrichthyans, of the genera Altusmirus, Natarapax and Smiliteroscyllium. The former is a ground shark, Smiliteroscyllium is a carpet shark, and Natarapax may be a ctenacanthid. The teeth of a galeomorph shark of uncertain affinities have also been found. Ammonites of the genera Karsteniceras and Olcostephanus have been found, with the former being represented by shells and aptychi, as well as lower beaks of an ammonite resembling Lamellaptychus. Calpionellids and dinoflagellates are also known from the same locality.

== Late Survival ==
Assuming that Cretacladoides is a member of the Falcatidae, a family of symmoriiform chondrichthyans that otherwise became extinct in the Carboniferous, it implies the existence of a ghost lineage. One explanation put forward by its describers is that it occupied deep-sea habitats, which allowed its line to survive the Permian–Triassic extinction event and leave very few fossils. Indeed, the deep-sea palaeoenvironment of the Klausrieglerbach locality was a dysoxic deep-sea environment, meaning it had very little oxygen. It was described in conjunction with a possible ctenacanthid, Natarapax trivortex, which may indicate an additional ghost lineage in France.

The interpretation of Cretacladoides as a falcatid was contested by Ivanov (2022), who argued that teeth of Cretacladoides only superficially resemble teeth of Paleozoic falcatids. The author noted the differences in the morphology of the tooth crown of Paleozoic and putative Cretaceous falcatids (different shape of cusps, which are separated from each other in Paleozoic teeth and connected to each other in Cretaceous teeth; cutting edge weakly developed or missing in Paleozoic teeth, but well-developed in Cretaceous teeth) and in the structure of their tooth base. Ivanov considered it more likely that putative falcatid teeth described from the Early Cretaceous of Europe should be attributed to neoselachians instead.
