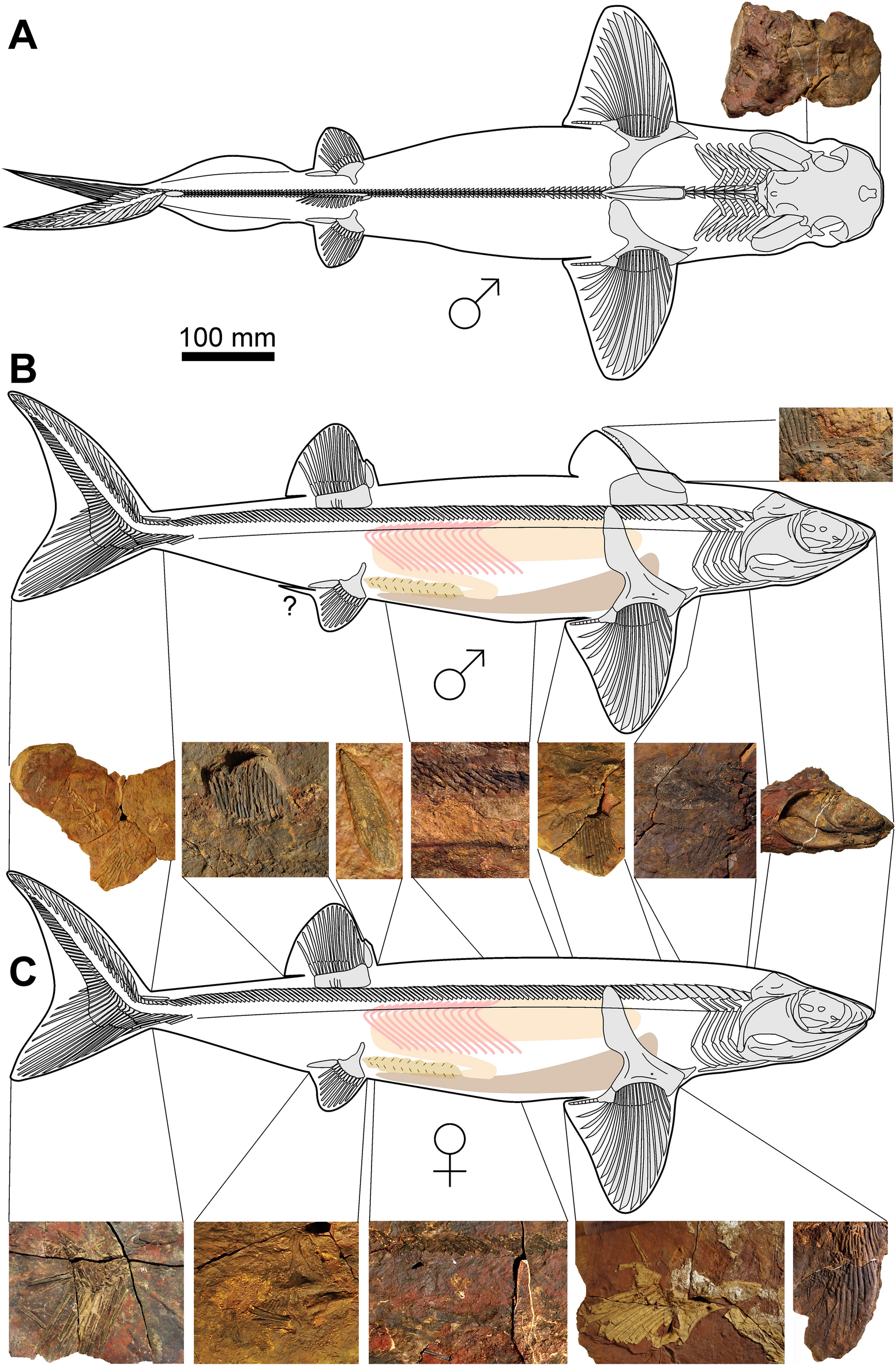
- Reconstructions of Maghriboselache

Scientific classification
- Kingdom: Animalia
- Phylum: Chordata
- Class: Chondrichthyes
- Subclass: Holocephali
- Order: †Cladoselachiformes
- Family: †Cladoselachidae
- Genus: †Maghriboselache; Klug et al., 2023

Type species
- Maghriboselache mohamezanei Klug et al., 2023

= Maghriboselache =

Maghriboselache Temporal range: Late Devonian (Famennian), 369.5–369 Ma

Extinct genus of cartilaginous fish

Maghriboselache is an extinct genus of cladoselachid symmoriiform fish that lived 369 million years ago during the Late Devonian (middle Famennian stage) of what is now Morocco. The genus contains a single species, M. mohmezanei. Maghriboselache represents the first cladoselachid to be discovered with significant details of the jaws, braincase and even endocranium. Along with Cladoselache, it shares a unique and distinctive tooth and upper jaw morphology.

== Discovery and naming ==
Maghriboselache type locality (Mousgar) in the southern Maïder Basin of eastern Anti-Atlas, Morocco

Maghriboselache was discovered in the eastern parts of the Anti-Atlas mountain range. Most specimens were found in the Thylacocephalan layer. The genus was described by Klug, Coates, Frey, Greif, Jobbins, Pohle, Lagnaoui, Haouz and Ginter in 2023.

The generic name, "Maghriboselache", is derived from "al Maghrib", the Arabic word for Morocco, combined with "σέλαχος" ("selachos"), the Greek word for cartilaginous fish. The specific name, "mohamezanei", honors Moha Mezane, a French amateur geologist and fossil hunter, who discovered some Maghriboselache fossils.

== Description ==
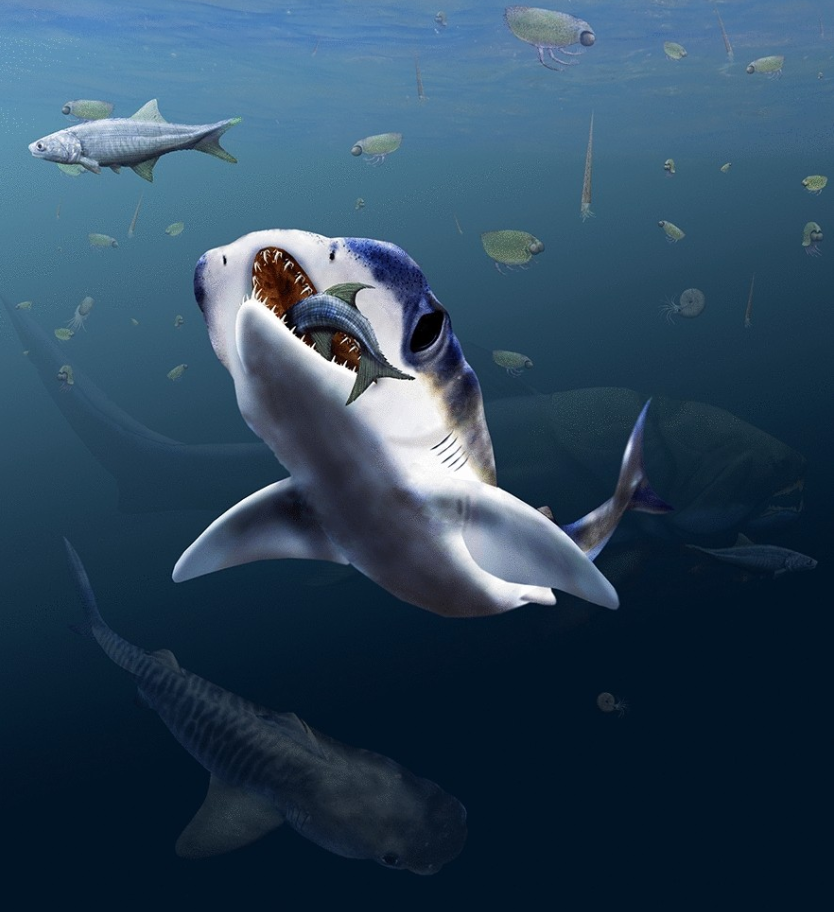
Life restoration

Maghriboselache is known from multiple preserved fossil specimens preserving most of its skeletal features. Some of these fossils are preserved three-dimensionally. It is unique from other cartilaginous fish (Chondrichthyes) due to its broad snout and nostril placement.

The genus has distally broad, flat, and strap-like radial pectoral fins and a cleaver-shaped palatoquadrate with an optic process shorter than palatine process.

The size of Maghriboselache specimens ranges between 0.8–2.5 metres (2.6–8.2 ft) in length, but most are slightly more than 1 metre (3.3 ft) long.

=== Teeth ===
The tooth fossils of Maghriboselache are only partially visible. The teeth on the Meckel's cartilage of this genus are nearly equally distanced with a 10% gap between each tooth.

== Classification ==
Klug et al. (2023) recovered Maghriboselache as a cladoselachid member of the chondrichthyian clade Symmoriiformes, as the sister taxon to Cladoselache. The Cladoselachidae is in turn sister to the clade containing Holocephali and Symmoriida. The results of their phylogenetic analyses are shown in the cladogram below:

- Chondrichthyes
  - †Pucapampellidae
  - - †Doliodus
    - - †Gogoselachus
      - - - - †Phoebodontidae
            - Elasmobranchii
          - - †Ctenacanthidae
        - - †Cladoselachidae
            - Cladoselache
            - Maghriboselache
          - - Holocephali
            - †Symmoriida
