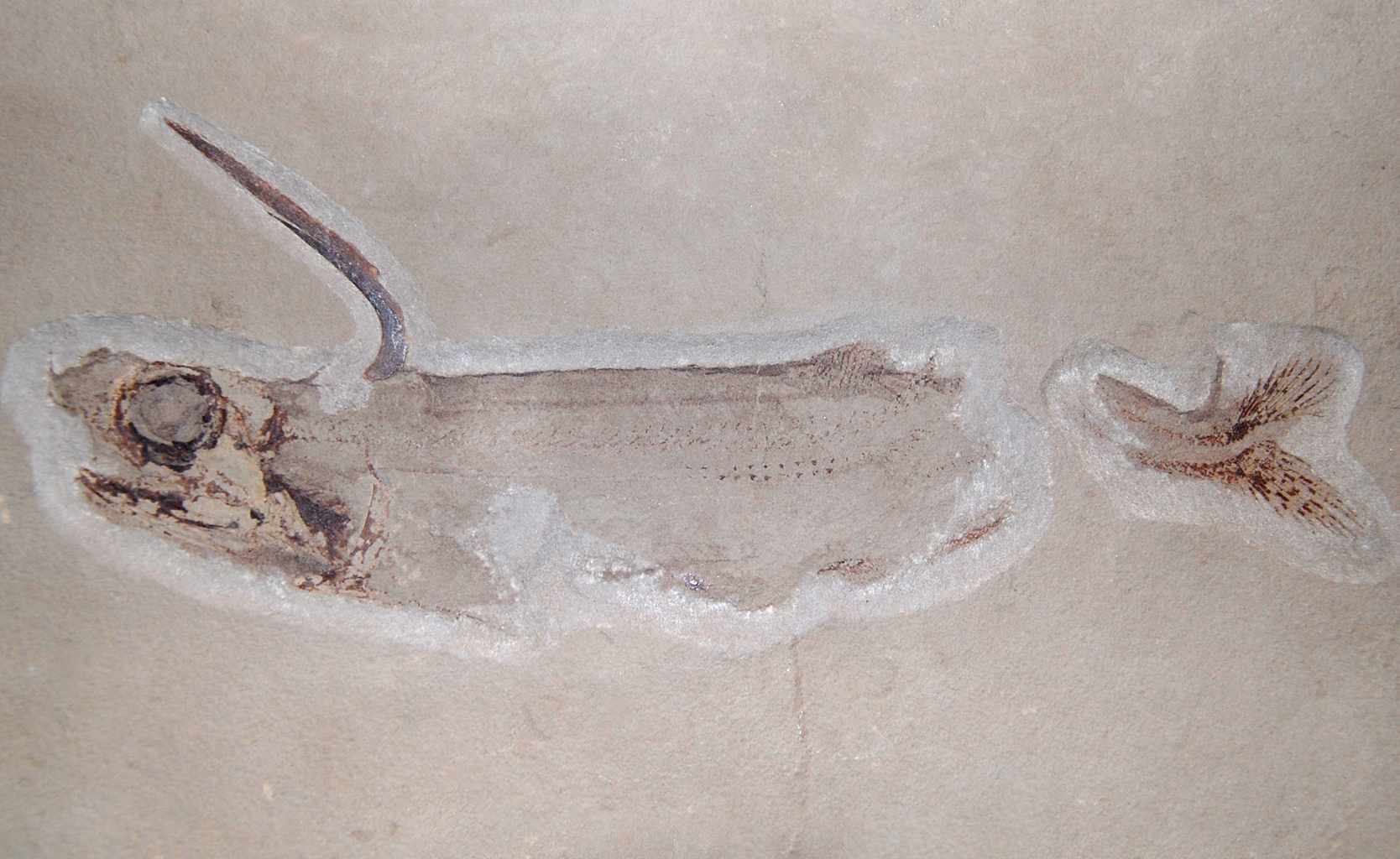
- Falcatus specimen in Vienna

Scientific classification
- Kingdom: Animalia
- Phylum: Chordata
- Class: Chondrichthyes
- Order: †Symmoriiformes
- Family: †Falcatidae

= Falcatidae =

Falcatidae Temporal range: 335–318 Ma

Extinct family of cartilaginous fishes

Falcatidae is a family of Paleozoic cartilaginous fish belonging to the order Symmoriiformes. Members of this family include Falcatus, a small fish from the Bear Gulch Limestone of Montana. The family first appeared around the start of the Carboniferous, and there is some evidence that they survived well into the early Cretaceous, though its putative Cretaceous members were also argued to be more likely neoselachians.

== Genera ==
- Denaea
- Falcatus
- Ozarcus?
- Stethacanthulus
- Cosmoselachus
- Cretacladoides? – possible Early Cretaceous (Valanginian) member of the family
