= Ozarcus =

Ozarcus Temporal range: Carboniferous, Serpukhovian

Scientific classification
- Kingdom: Animalia
- Phylum: Chordata
- Class: Chondrichthyes
- Order: †Symmoriiformes
- Family: †Falcatidae
- Genus: †Ozarcus; Pradel et al., 2014
- Species: †O. mapesae

Binomial name
- †Ozarcus mapesae Pradel et al., 2014

Extinct genus of cartilaginous fishes

Ozarcus is an extinct genus of symmoriiform cartilaginous fish from the Carboniferous period of Arkansas. The type species, Ozarcus mapesae, was named in 2014 based on cartilaginous skulls from the Serpukhovian-age Fayetteville Formation. The genus is named after the Ozark Mountains (the region of discovery) while the species was named after its discoverer, G. K. Mapes.

== Discovery and naming ==
The holotype fossil, AMNH FF20544 (formerly labelled as OUZC 5300), was a warped yet three-dimensionally-preserved skull with gill baskets that was discovered by G. K. Mapes. Three additional skulls referrable to Ozarcus are stored at the AMNH. A partial braincase (FMNH PF 13242) from the same site, previously been referred to Cobelodus and described in detail in 2007, was referred to Ozarcus in 2017.

== Description ==
Ozarcus has branchial arches (bones of the gill basket) with unexpected similarities to osteichthyans (bony fish) rather than chondrichthyans (cartilaginous fish). Like other jawed fish, there are five pairs of branchial arches, not counting the larger hyoid arch which lies in front of the gills and behind the jaws. Each branchial arch starts with basibranchial and hypobranchial bones along the lower midline of the throat, linking upwards tobackwards-leaning ceratobranchials, then forwards-leaning epibranchials, and finally blocky pharyngobranchials. Unlike modern chondrichthyans, the first four branchial arches have two pairs of pharyngobranchials which bend forwards to form a solid roof to the gill cavity, conditions akin to the two sets (infra- and supra-pharyngobranchials) of osteichthyans. In addition, the hypobranchials flanking the lower midline also project forwards, in contrast to living sharks.

== Classification ==
The initial description of Ozarcus tentatively placed it as a member of the family Falcatidae, based on its small teeth similar to Falcatus and Damocles. Falcatids were a type of symmoriiform, shark-like fish which were probably distant relatives of modern chimaeras. In contrast, later papers placed Ozarcus (represented by specimen FMNH PF 13242) as the sister taxon to Dwykaselachus or close to the base of Symmoriiformes, far away from the falcatid Damocles.
