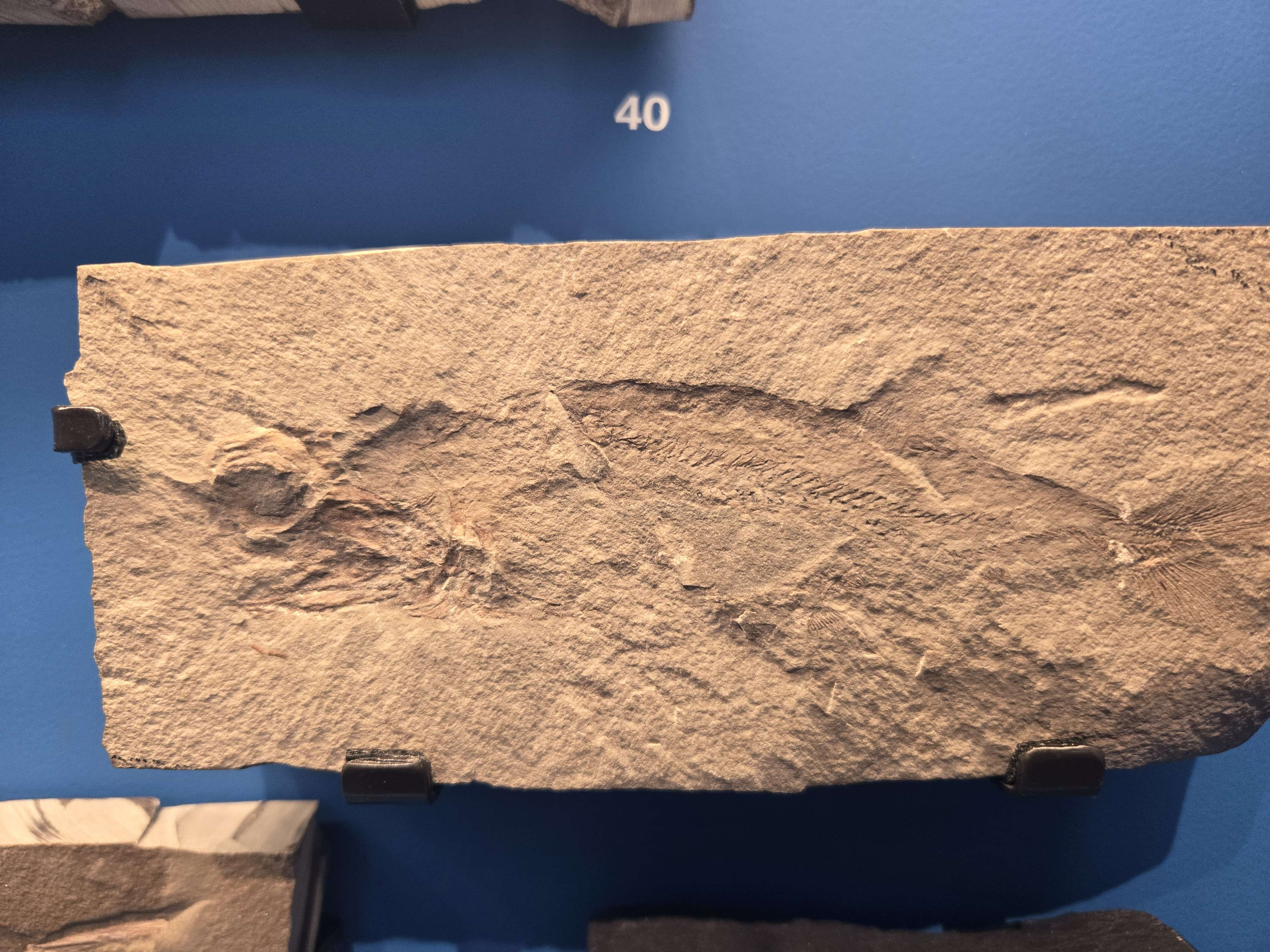
- Specimen of D. serratus housed at the ROM.

Scientific classification
- Kingdom: Animalia
- Phylum: Chordata
- Class: Chondrichthyes
- Order: †Symmoriiformes
- Genus: †Damocles; Lund, 1986

Type species
- * †Damocles serratus Lund, 1986

Other species
- †D. attenuatus Davis, 1883

= Damocles (genus) =

Damocles Temporal range: Mississippian

Genus of cartilaginous fishes

Damocles is a genus of cartilaginous fish from the Mississippian age Bear Gulch Limestone of Montana, United States and from the Mountain Limestone of Armagh, Northern Ireland. Two species, D. serratus and D. attenuatus, have been assigned, with D. attenuatus originally being classified as a species of the form-genus Physonemus. Members of the genus were predatory, and males possessed a distinctive serrated, sword-like spine which was positioned over their head.

== Discovery and naming ==
The first fossils now considered Damocles were described in 1883 by naturalist James William Davis, and were assigned to the genus Physonemus. This species, named "Physonemus" attenuatus, was based on isolated spines from the Mountain Limestone of Armagh, Northern Ireland. Well preserved body fossils of the type species, Damocles serratus, were described in 1986 from the Bear Gulch Limestone of Montana by paleontologist Richard Lund.

The genus name is in reference to the character Damocles of Greek literature, because of a sword-like dorsal spine that was angled over the fish's head like the Sword of Damocles in the story. The type species, D. serratus, is named for the serrations along its dorsal spine.

== Description ==
Damocles had an internal skeleton composed of cartilage. The body shape of Damocles was fusiform, and the tail fin was homocercal (crescent shaped). The genus is highly sexually dimorphic, and male Damocles possessed a forward-angled, serrated spine on their back and large denticles on top of the head. The second dorsal fin was triangular, while the first dorsal fin was either absent or fused into the dorsal fin spine. The teeth of the genus were cladodont.

== Paleobiology ==
Damocles was a predator, with cladodont teeth that were adapted for grasping prey.

Damocles had a highly skewed sex ratio, with eleven males for every one female based on the known sample of fossils. This may be the result of genuine population trends, or of differing habitat preferences between the sexes.

== Paleoecology ==
The Bear Gulch Limestone was formed by a shallow marine bay. More than 90 species of fish are known from this locality, most of which belong to the class Chondrichthyes.
