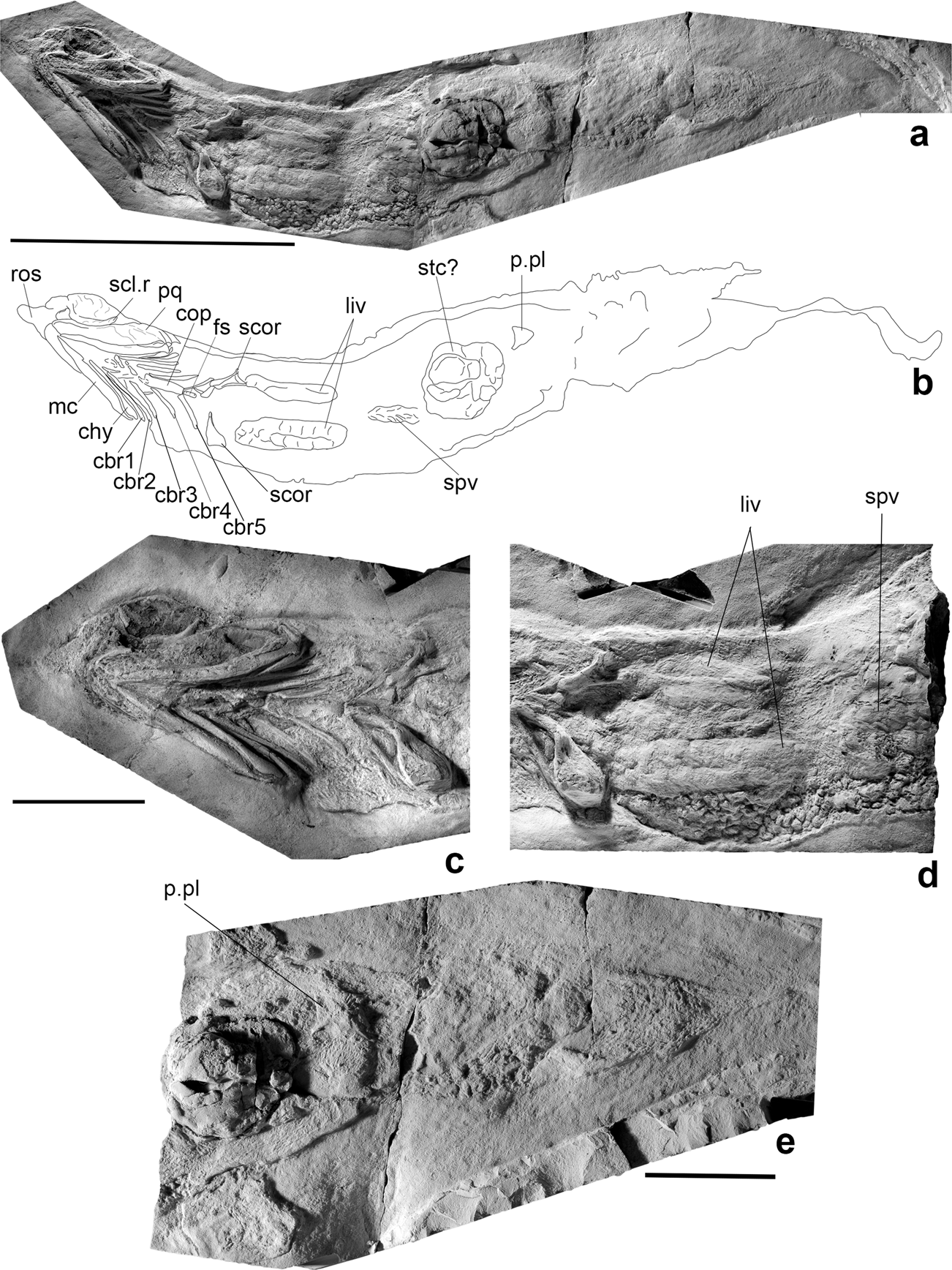
- Holotype and only known specimen (PIMUZ A/I 4806)
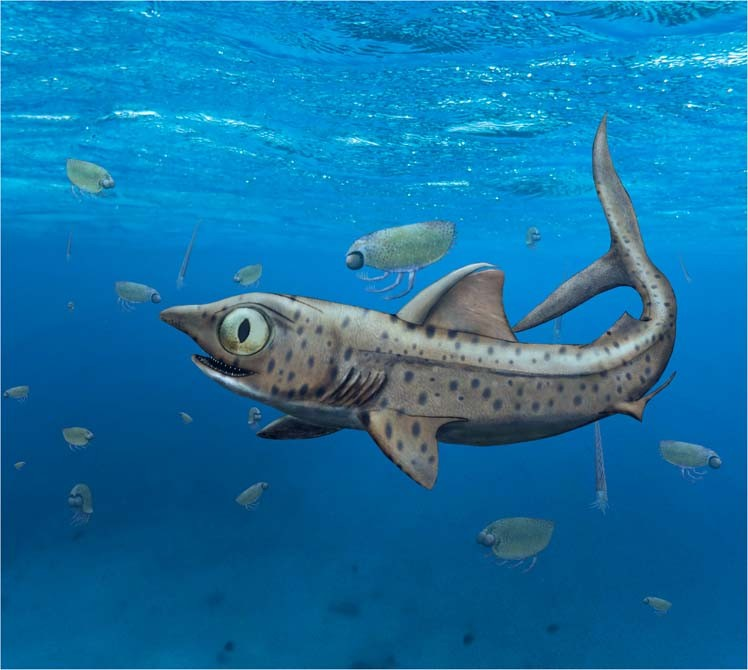
- Life restoration

Scientific classification
- Kingdom: Animalia
- Phylum: Chordata
- Class: Chondrichthyes
- Order: †Symmoriiformes
- Genus: †Ferromirum; Frey et al. 2020

Type species
- Ferromirum oukherbouchi Frey et al. 2020

= Ferromirum =

Ferromirum Temporal range: Famennian

Extinct genus of cartilaginous fish

Ferromirum is an extinct genus of symmoriiform cartilaginous fish known from the late Devonian (mid Famennian) Ibâouane Formation in the southeastern Anti-Atlas of Morocco, with a single species Ferromirum oukherbouchi. It is known from a single well preserved skeleton, which is of a small individual less than half a metre in length. The jaws and hyoid arch are preserved uncrushed. The skull has large orbits (eye sockets) which preserve scleral rings. The teeth are small and have a cladodont morphology. The body is slender. The first dorsal fin has a smooth fin spine, which curves posteriorly towards its tip.
