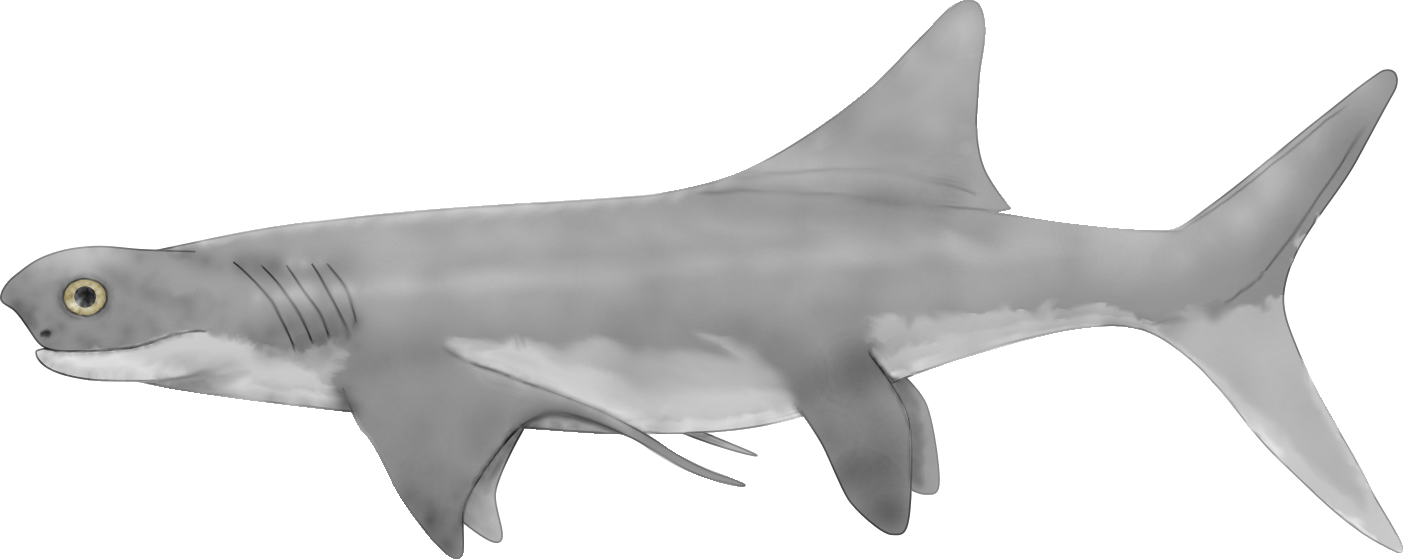
- Life restoration

Scientific classification
- Kingdom: Animalia
- Phylum: Chordata
- Class: Chondrichthyes
- Order: †Symmoriiformes
- Family: †Symmoriidae
- Genus: †Cobelodus; Zangerl, 1973

Type species
- †Cobelodus aculeata Cope, 1894

Species
- †C. aculeatus Cope, 1894 †C. obliquus Ivanov, 2005

= Cobelodus =

Cobelodus Temporal range: Pennsylvanian-Artinskian 323–283 Ma

Extinct genus of cartilaginous fishes

Cobelodus is an extinct genus of cartilaginous fish known from the late Carboniferous to the early Permian period. The type specimen, assigned to the genus Styptobasis, was discovered by Edward Drinker Cope in Illinois Basin black coal shales. Rainer Zangerl reassigned S. aculeata in 1973 to the genus Cobelodus, translating to 'needle tooth'. Cope's description was based from a tooth fragment and was compared to the genus Monocladodus. Cobelodus differs from Styptobasis and Monocladodus in the anatomy of its teeth and pectoral fins.

Cobelodus was an up to 1.5–2 metres (4.9–6.6 ft) long predator. It may have been related to the chimaera, but Cobelodus had a number of differences from modern forms. It had a bulbous head, large eyes, a high-arched back, and a dorsal fin placed far to the rear, above the pelvic fins. Another unusual physical feature of Cobelodus are the 30 centimetres (12 in) long, flexible cartilagenous 'tentacles' sprouting from its pectoral fins. Their purpose is unknown. Type species, C. aculeatus is known from shoreline lagoon.
