= Dwykaselachus =

Dwykaselachus Temporal range: Guadalupian (Middle Permian)

Scientific classification
- Kingdom: Animalia
- Phylum: Chordata
- Class: Chondrichthyes
- Order: †Symmoriiformes
- Genus: †Dwykaselachus; Oelofsen, 1986

Type species
- †Dwykaselachus oosthuizeni Oelofsen, 1986

Permian cartilaginous fish

Dwykaselachus (pronounced dwike-a-selak-us) is an extinct genus of symmoriiform, a cartilaginous fish that lived in what is now South Africa during the Permian period around 280 million years ago. It was first discovered in the 1980s, in a nodule of sediments from the Karoo Supergroup. Dwykaselachus was named based on Dwyka Group, the group of sedimentary geological formation in the southeastern part of Africa. It represents the place where the type species Dwykaselachus oosthuizeni was found.

Prior to its discovery, symmoriiforms were thought to be related to sharks, in the group Elasmobranchii. However, CT scans of its relatively intact skull showed traits such as brain shape and inner ear structure that are shared with cartilaginous fish from the group Holocephali, which includes chimaeras. This implies that the first major radiation of cartilaginous fish after the Devonian extinction was in fact holocephalians, rather than sharks as commonly believed.

== History and discovery ==
Dwykaselachus was first discovered in the 1980, in a nodule of sediments from the Dwyka Group of the Karoo Supergroup by amateur paleontologist Roy Oosthuizen, and originally described by Burger Wilhelm Oelofsen in 1986.

In 2013, co-author Dr. Robert Gess, a researcher in the Geology Department and Albany Museum at Rhodes University in South Africa, CT-scanned the skull of Dwykaselachus, and showed a symmoriiform morphology that resembles a 3D-preserved model. At first, the skull was thought to belong a symmoriid shark, but after the CT-scanning, the image appeared to show anatomical structures that mark the specimen as an early relative of chimaeras.

A research team led by Michael Coates from the University of Chicago Medical center has found that ghosts sharks, also named chimaeras, are related to the 280 million-year-old fish Dwykaselachus oosthuizeni. Chimaera-like features including tell-tale shapes of cranial nerves, nostrils and inner ears suggests that D. oosthuizeni was included in the group Symmoriiformes. Although resembling sharks in appearance, Dwykaselachus was not actually a shark, but rather had diverged from a common ancestor with true sharks in the Devonian.

== Description ==
The computed tomography (CT) analysis of Dwykaselachus shows a symmoriiform morphology with three-dimensional articulation. It exhibits some chondrichthyans features such as the large hypophyseal chamber and dorsally projecting endolymphatic duct. The most visible shared specialization with chimaeroids is the offset between the dorsally prominent mesencephalon chamber and the ventral level of the telencephalon space. Moreover, Dwykaselachus share the characteristic chimaeroid elevation of the midbrain, relative to forebrain.

The discovered skull has unusually ethmoid cartilages which include large hemispherical nasal capsules. The nasal capsules are bridged by an internasal groove. Each capsule roof is shorter than the floor, suggesting that, unlike many sharks, the narial openings were directed slightly dorsally. The capsule wall openings include a canal for the olfactory nerve (nerve I), a foramen for the profundus nerve (nerve V), and an opening in the floor, which resembles the subnasal fenestra of Doliodus. The braincase roof is mostly complete, leave little space for the fontanelle. Therefore, a precerebral fontanelle, a signature of non-chimaeroid chondrichthyans, is either reduced or absent.

== Classification ==
The phylogenetic analyses establish the importance of the shared similarities between Dwykaselachus and chimaeroids, suggesting symmoriiforms, including Dwykaselachus, comprise a sister clade to iniopterygians and holocephalans. The detailed fossil chondrichthyans data used in Coates et al.'s paper provided strong evidence supporting that hypothesis. Thus, expansion of holocephalian stem membership moves the chondrichthyans crown group divergence to a deeper phylogenetic node.

Another study done by Coates et al. showed that phylogenetic analysis confirms Gladbachus as a stem chondrichthyan. Strong evidence was provided to support chondrichthyans as a crown clade. It suggests that the initial evolutionary radiation of crown chondrichthyans is primarily post-Devonian, forming a significant component of the vertebrate recovery after the end-Devonian extinction.

The current analyses focus on the conflicting patterns of character state distributions, implying repeated and convergent evolution of chondrichthyan-like specializations among the earliest total group members. Early chondrichthyan species suggest that the morphological disparity in the early members of the chondrichthyan total group was probably substantially greater than that which is observed.
