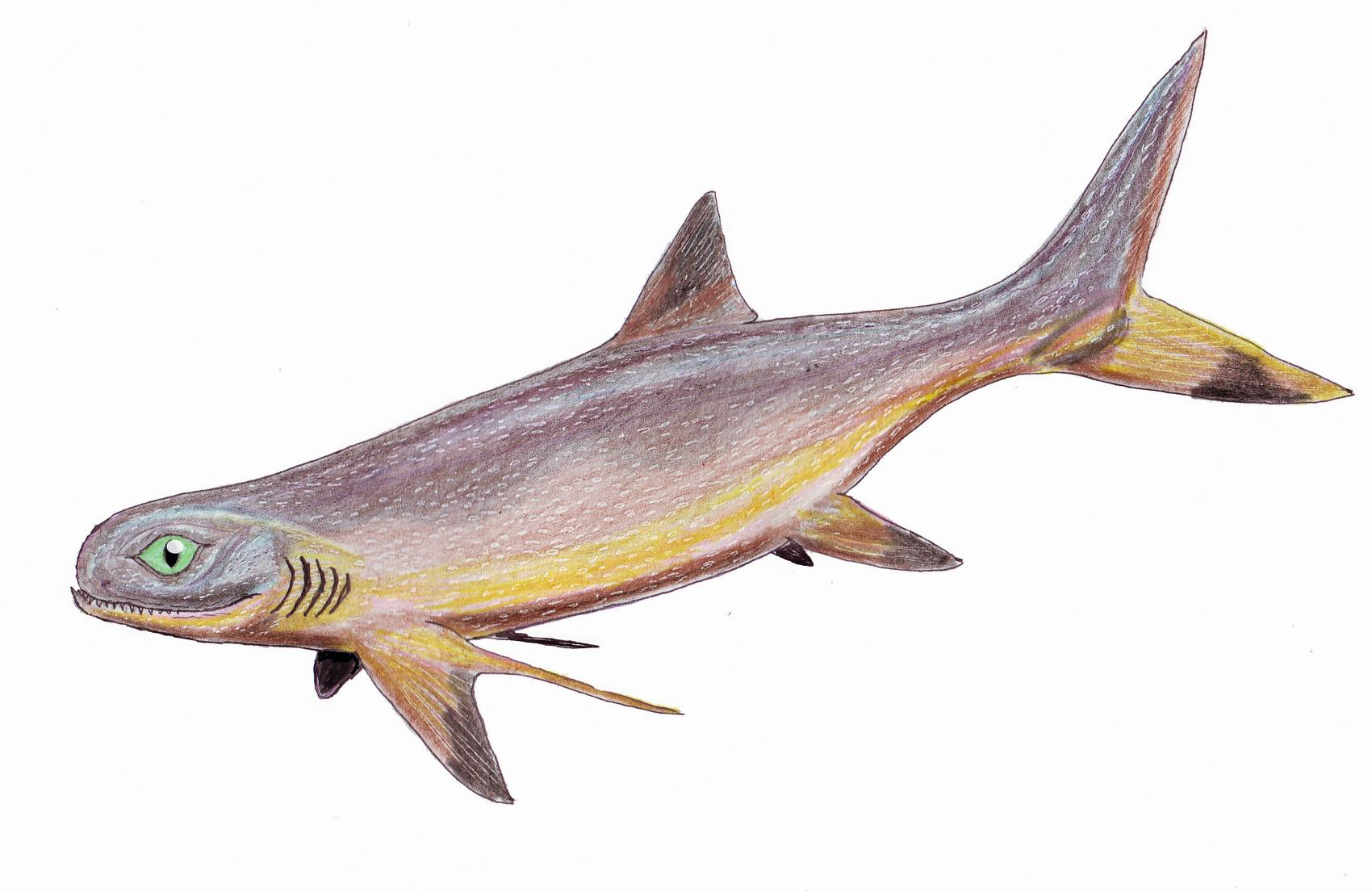
- Symmorium

Scientific classification
- Kingdom: Animalia
- Phylum: Chordata
- Class: Chondrichthyes
- Order: †Symmoriiformes; Zangerl, 1981 (sensu Maisey, 2007)

Families and genera
- Dwykaselachus; Ferromirum; Gutturensis; Kawichthys; Ozarcus; Cladoselachidae?; Symmoriidae; Falcatidae; Stethacanthidae

= Symmoriiformes =

Symmoriiformes Temporal range: 382.7–280 Ma Late Devonian - Early Permian (Members of the family Falcatidae might have survived until the Early Cretaceous in Europe.)

Extinct order of cartilaginous fishes

Symmoriiformes is an extinct order of cartilaginous fish. Originally named Symmoriida by Zangerl (1981), the name has since been corrected to Symmoriiformes to avoid confusion with a family. The symmoriiform fossils record begins during the late Devonian, and most had become extinct by the start of the Permian, with the genus Dwykaselachus from the Artinskian-Kungurian of South Africa being the latest known uncontroversial occurrence. Teeth described from the Valanginian of France and Austria indicate that members of the family Falcatidae might have survived until the Early Cretaceous; however, it has since been proposed that these teeth more likely belonged to neoselachian sharks.

== Fossil distribution ==
Fossil evidence of Symmoriida have been found at Bear Gulch, Fergus County, Montana, Bethel Quarry, Pike County, Indiana, Kinshozan quarry, Alaska, Gifu Prefecture, Japan, Bashkortostan, Russian Federation and possibly also France.

== Classification ==
Symmoriiformes were previously regarded as members of the Elasmobranchii, making them distant relatives of living sharks and rays. Zangerl (1981), who erected the order, considered them to be elasmobranchs, and this classification has been followed by some subsequent authors.

The uncrushed braincase of Dwykaselachus indicates that symmoriiforms may be members of Holocephali, as much of the internal anatomy, including the otic labyrinth and brain space configuration are similar to those of living chimaeras. Symmoriiformes have alternatively been considered early diverging stem-group chondrichthyans.

== Gallery ==
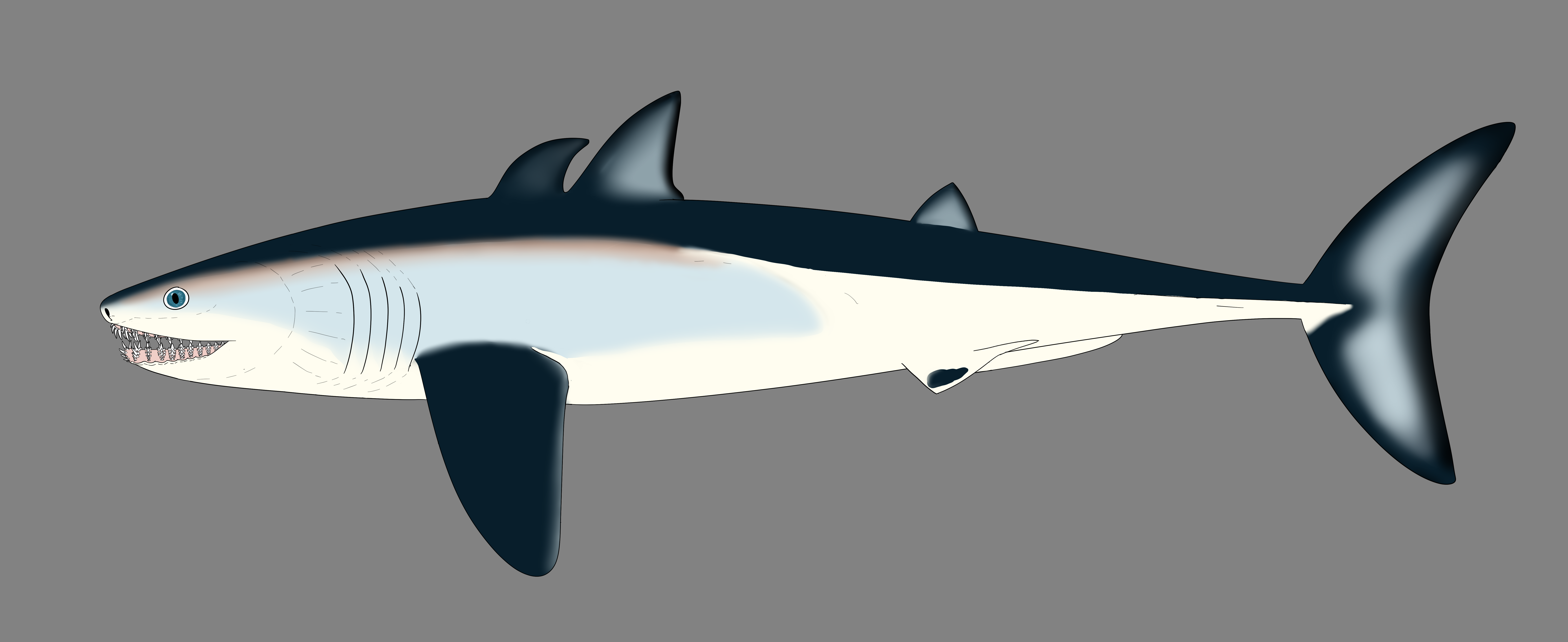
Cladoselache fyleri

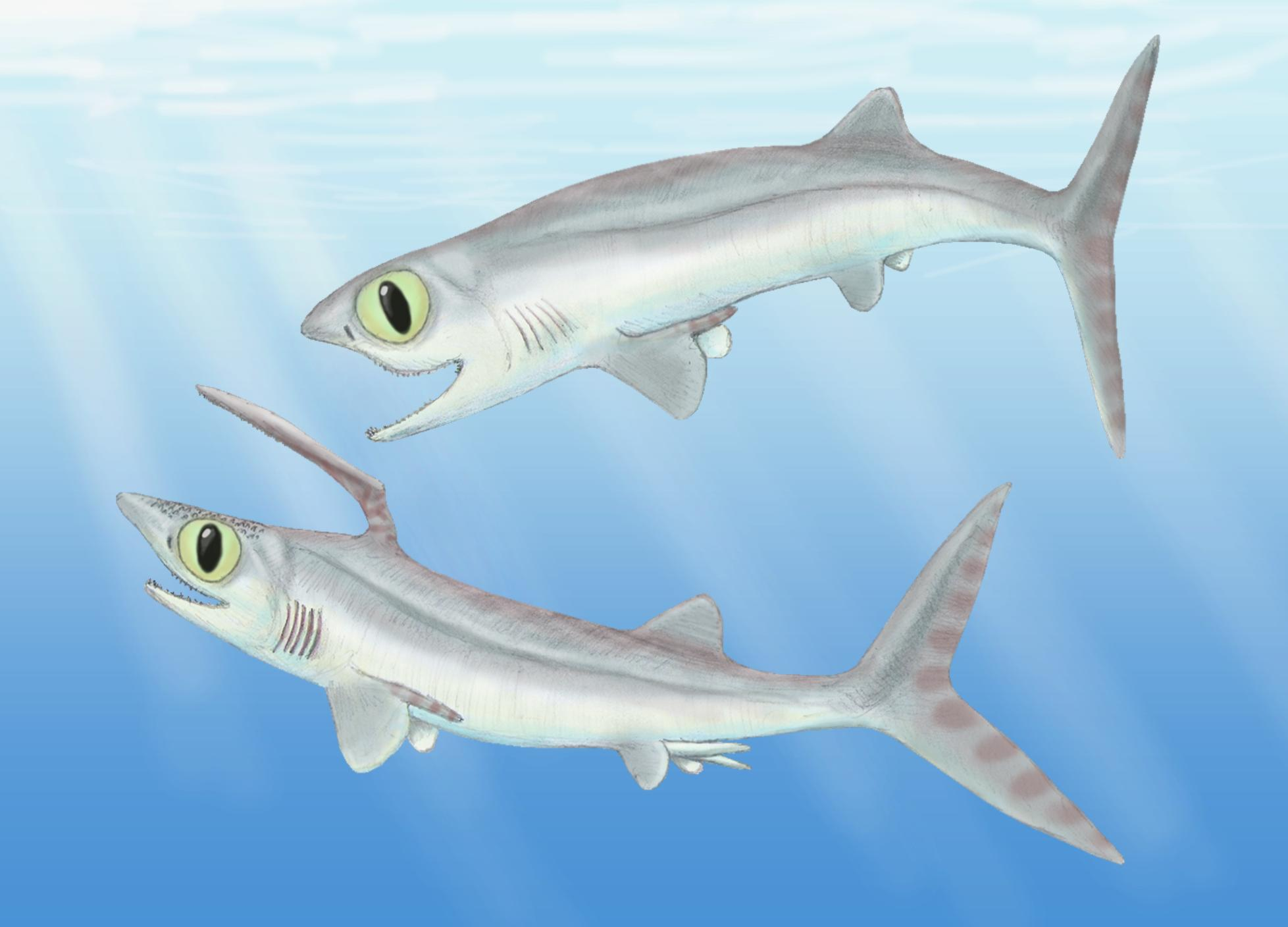
Falcatus falcatus

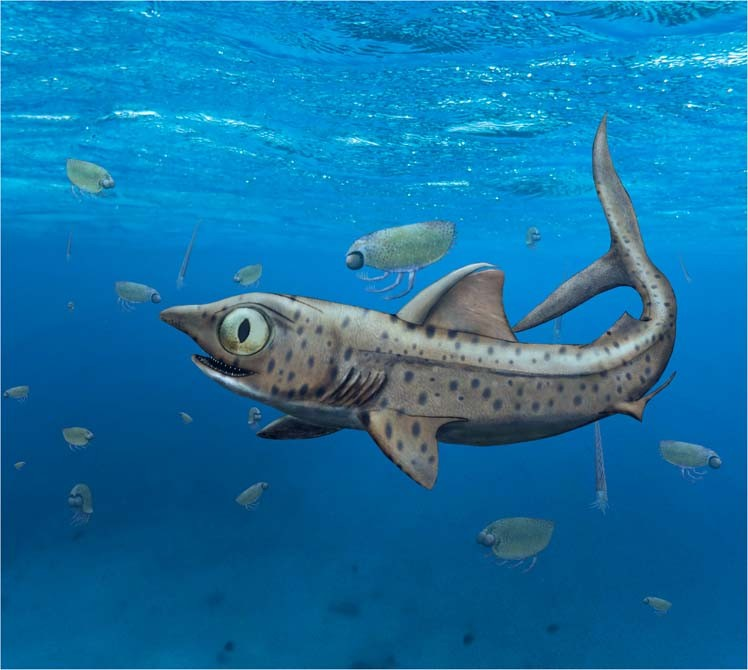
Ferromirum oukherbouchi

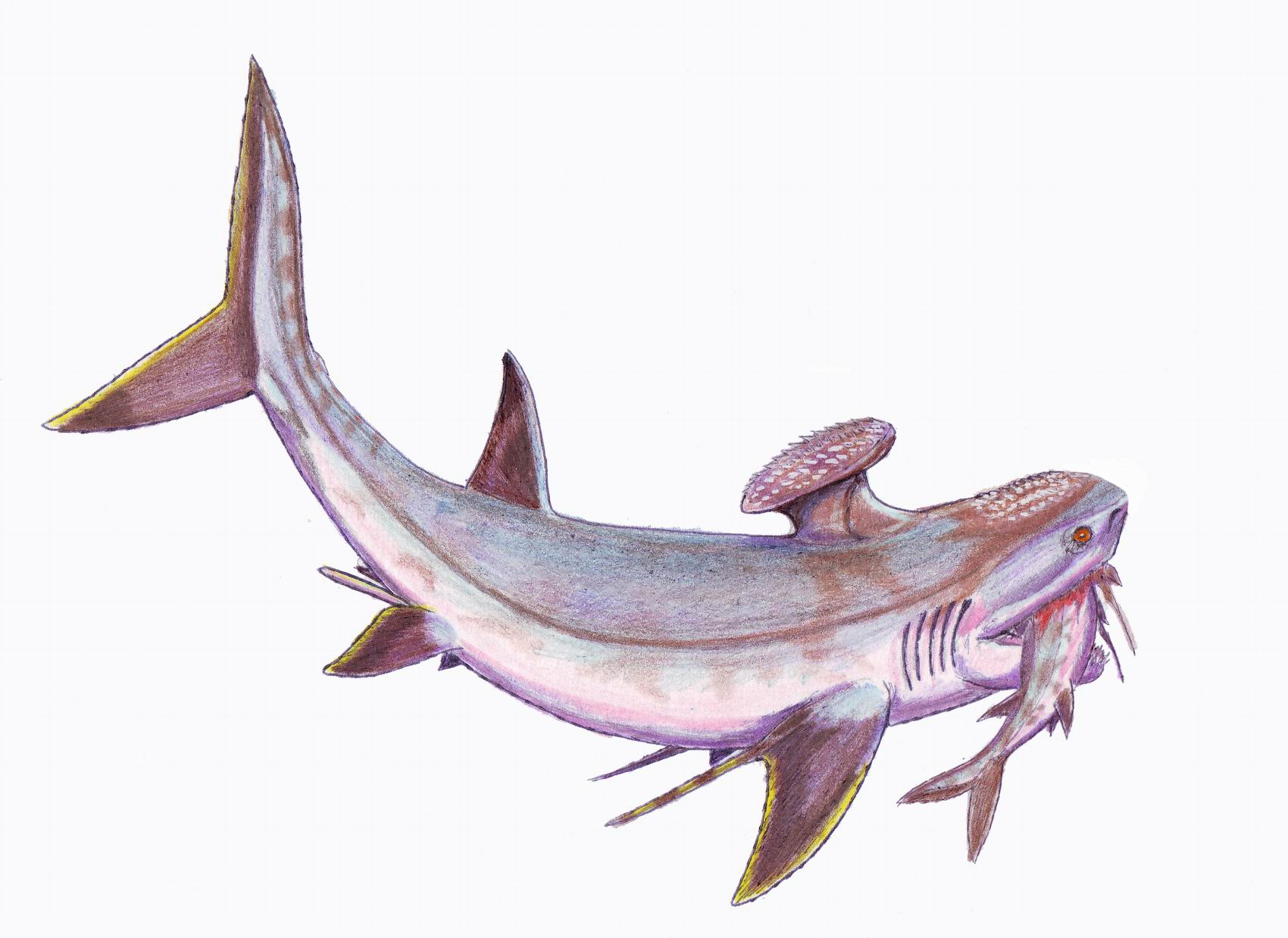
Stethacanthus productus

Akmonistion zangerli

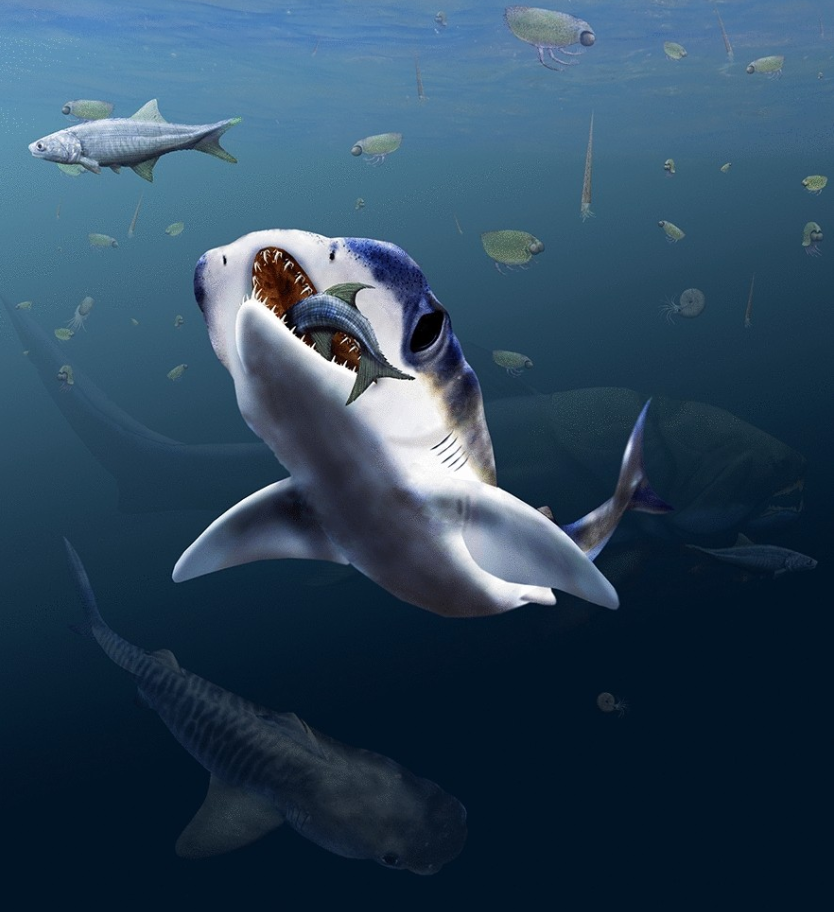
Maghriboselache mohamezanei
