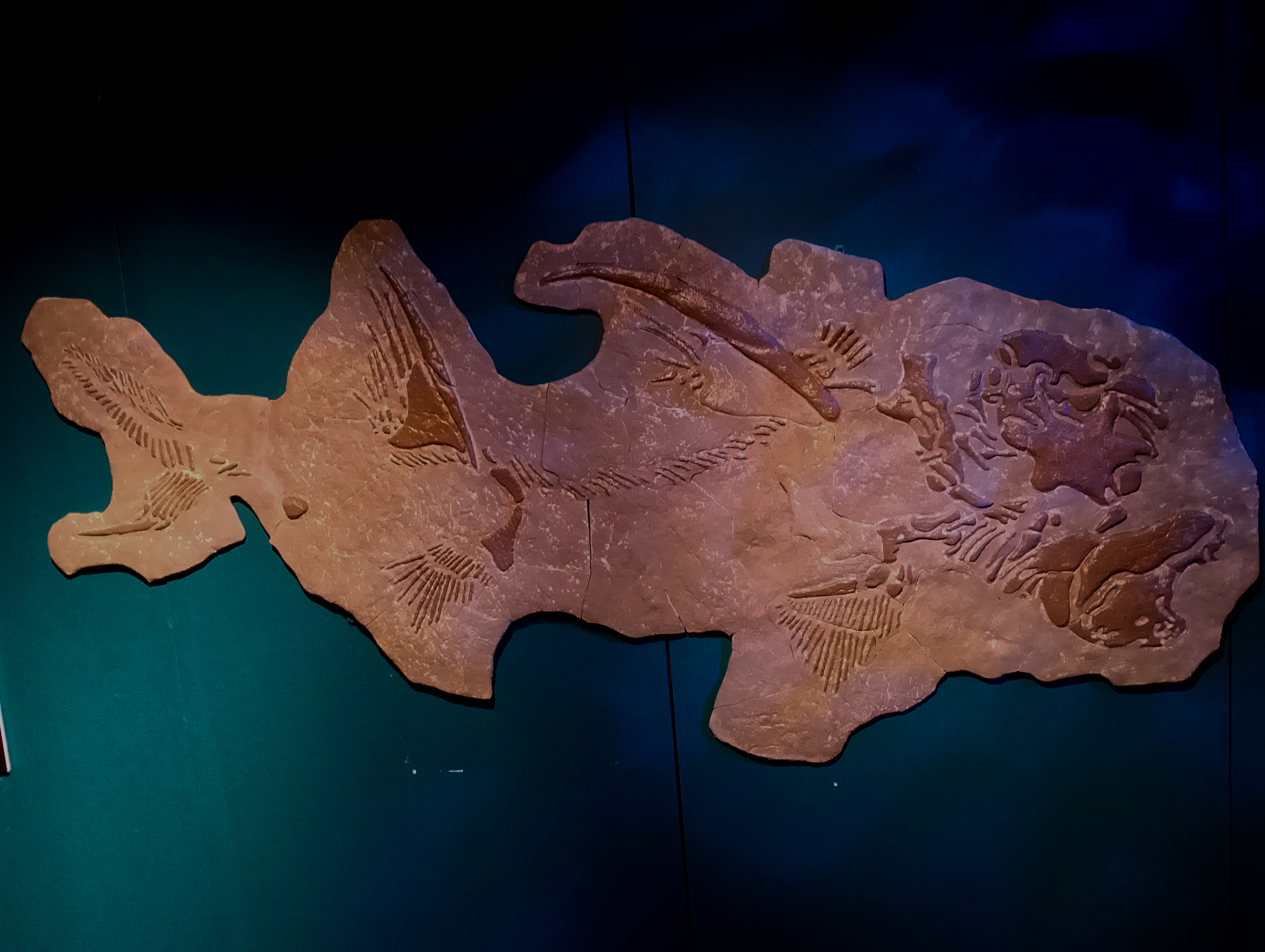
- Cast of the holotype of Dracopristis displayed at the Northampton Museum and Art Gallery

Scientific classification
- Kingdom: Animalia
- Phylum: Chordata
- Class: Chondrichthyes
- Subclass: Elasmobranchii
- Order: †Ctenacanthiformes
- Family: †Heslerodidae
- Genus: †Dracopristis; Hodnett et al., 2021
- Species: †D. hoffmanorum

Binomial name
- †Dracopristis hoffmanorum Hodnett et al., 2021

= Dracopristis =

Dracopristis Temporal range: Carboniferous (Kasimovian), 307–303.7 Ma

Extinct genus of cartilaginous fish

Dracopristis (meaning 'dragon shark') is an extinct genus of ctenacanth (a group of shark-like cartilaginous fish) that lived during the Carboniferous period in North America, around 307 million years ago. The species was discovered in the Kinney Brick Quarry in New Mexico, USA. Like many fossils from the site, the fossils of Dracopristis are very well-preserved. A single species is known, Dracopristis hoffmanorum, which is named in honor of Ralph and Jeanette Hoffman, the owners of the quarry. Prior to being scientific named, D. hoffmanorum was informally referred to as the "Godzilla shark".

Dracopristis possessed large dermal denticles along its head, along with rows of short, multi-cusped teeth in its jaws and very large spines on its dorsal fins, the latter of which inspired the name of the genus. The dorsal spines of the type specimen are about 0.57 m (1 ft 10 in) in length, while the entire body was approximately 2.06 m (6 ft 9 in) in length. Its large spines were likely used for defense against larger fish, while Dracopristis itself was likely a benthic predator that inhabited shallow, brackish-water environments.

== Discovery and naming ==
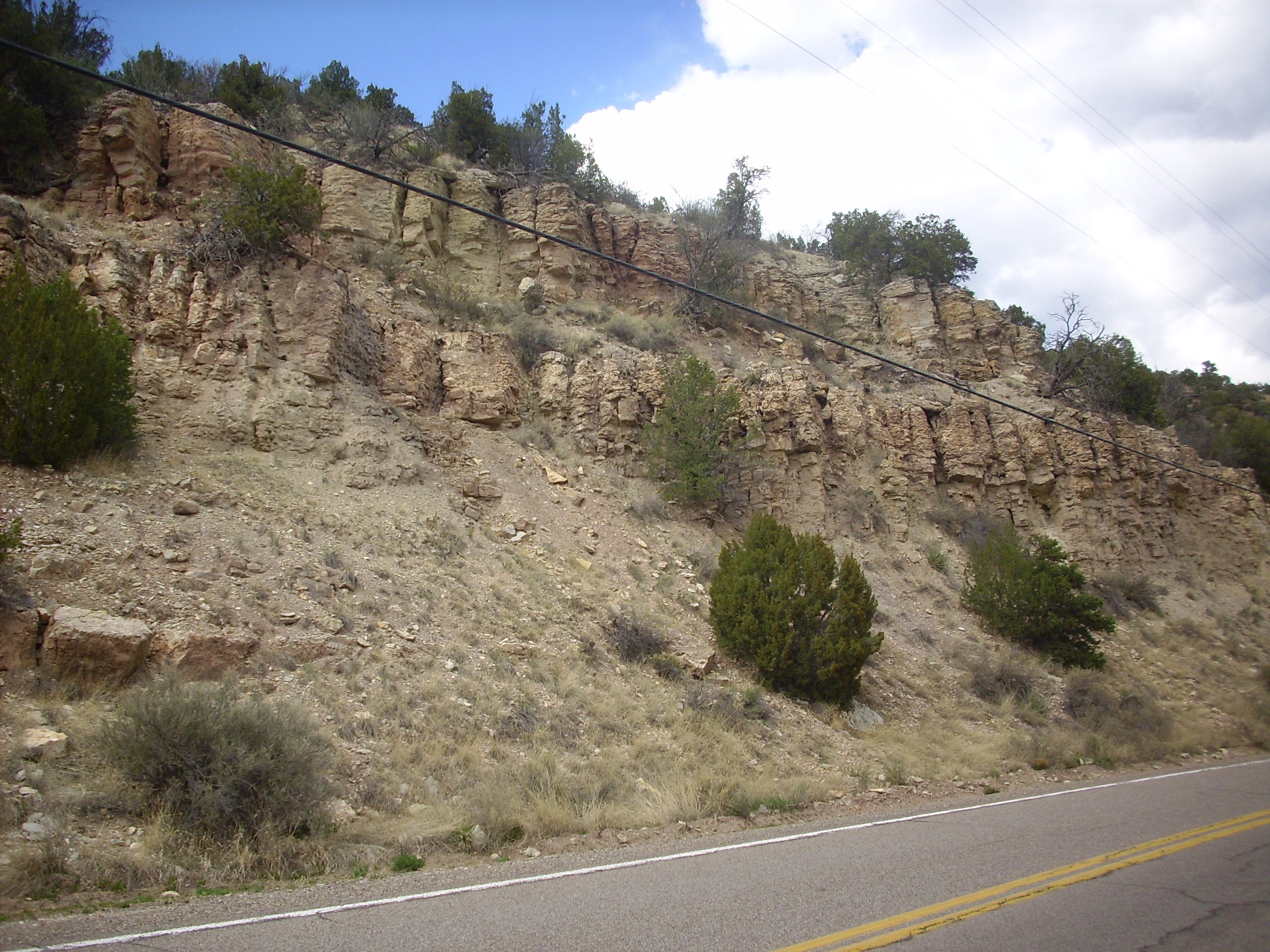
An exposure of limestone belonging to the Atrasado Formation, photographed along a roadcut near Jemez Springs, New Mexico

The holotype of D. hoffmanorum was first discovered in May of 2013, when John-Paul Hodnett discovered the specimen from the late Carboniferous-aged strata of Albuquerque, New Mexico. The fossils were discovered in an exposure of the Atrasado Formation which, based on index fossils such as conodonts, has been dated to the Kasimovian stage of the late Pennsylvanian (or the equivalent American Missourian regional stage). The specific locality which produced the specimen, the Kinney Brick Quarry, is considered a Konservat-Lagerstätten due to the exceptional quality of its fossils.

Dracopristis was formally described by Hodnett and coauthors in 2021. The holotype (catalogued as NMMNH P-68537) is a very complete articulated skeleton embedded in a matrix of calcareous shale, which belonged to an adult female and is housed in the collection of the New Mexico Museum of Natural History and Science. Around 87–90% of the cartilaginous skeleton, as well as the animal's coating of tooth-like dermal denticles and impressions of its body outline are all preserved. The specimen was studied via CT scanning in 2014, which clarified details of its skeletal anatomy that were otherwise obscured by the rock matrix. A second assigned specimen (NMMNH P-19181) consists of a neurocranium from a juvenile individual, and was originally misidentified as belonging to Orthacanthus huberi.

The genus name, Dracopristis, is derived from the Latin words draco, meaning 'dragon', and pristis, here meaning 'shark'. The dorsal spines, denticles, and rows of teeth have been suggested to give the animal a "dragon-like" appearance, and -pristis is a common suffix given to shark-like fishes. (Note: The root -pristis is traditionally recognized to translate as "sawfish" and is derived from the Ancient Greek name of the animal, πρίστις or prístēs.) The specific name, D. hoffmanorum, is in honor of Ralph and Jeanette Hoffman who own the Kinney Brick Quarry and helped conduct research on the taxon. Prior to its scientific description, D. hoffmanorum was informally referred to as the "Godzilla shark" or, alternatively, as the "Manzano ctenacanth" after the Manzano Mountains. The "Godzilla" nickname was inspired by the genus' defining exaggerated back spines and teeth, which are said to resemble the character.

== Description ==
The type specimen of Dracopristis hoffmanorum is around 2.06 m (6 ft 9 in) in length, although some earlier sources erroneously state lengths of up to 2.5 m (8 ft 2 in). Although the specimen is crushed, the skull, gill arches and dorsal fins remain articulated, and the pelvic girdle and anal fins are particularly well preserved. D. hoffmanorum had an elongated and dorsoventrally (from top to bottom) flattened body, which is also indicated by the shape of preserved soft tissue impressions and the arrangement of articulated patches of dermal denticles.

=== Skull and body ===
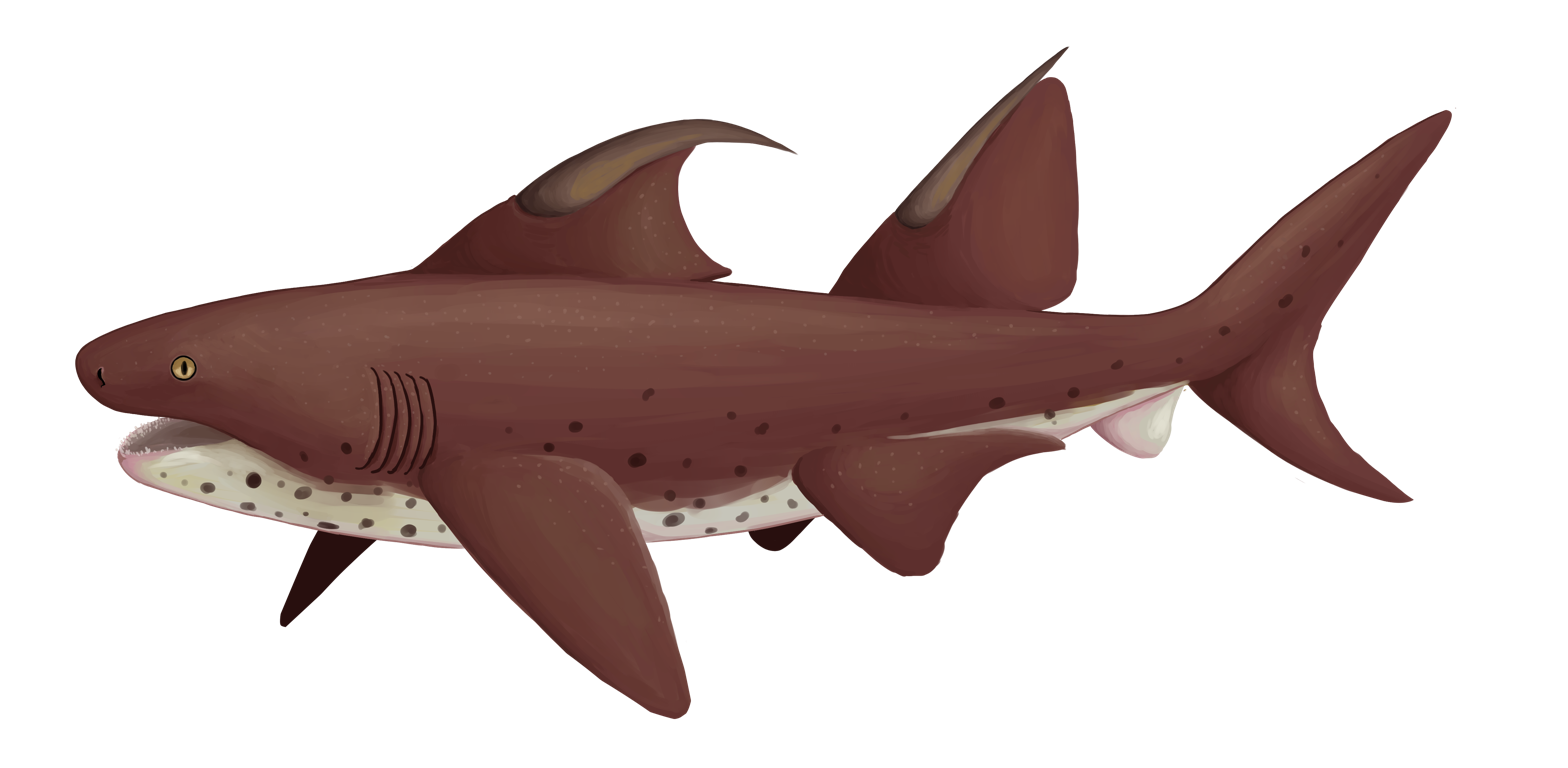
Life reconstruction of Dracopristis

The skull of Dracopristis was broad – nearly as wide as it was long – with eye sockets positioned far forward and a short rostrum. Fenestrae which housed cranial nerves are preserved, but the interior of the skull is too severely crushed for its internal nervous anatomy to be studied, even with the use of CT scans. Compared to other ctenacanths, the jaws were proportionally large and robust. As in living sharks, the rear portions of the palatoquadrates (upper jaws) articulated with the otic processes (equivalent to ear canals). However, unlike living sharks, the forward processes of the palatoquadrates were rigidly connected to the cranium, and additional "anterodorsal processes" anchored the rear portions of the palatoquadrates to the skull, rendering the upper jaws akinetic and inflexible (termed amphistyly). The Meckel's cartilages (lower jaws) articulated with the palatoquadrates. The hyomandibular arch was well-developed, and five gill arches were present which decreased in size towards the back of the body.

The scapulocoracoids were fused at their coracoidal portions, while the pelvic girdles were unfused. Mineralized neural and haemal arches are preserved along the length of the body, although the vertebral centra are not known. The holotype of D. hoffmanorum preserves two dorsal fins, an anal fin, pectoral fins, pelvic fins, and most of the heterocercal caudal fin. Both dorsal fins were proportionally large, as were the broad, triangular pectoral fins. The fins were supported by rods of cartilage known as radials and ceratotrichia, with a triangular basal cartilage plate also supporting each of the dorsal fins. While the known individual lacks pelvic claspers, this is attributed to the specimen being female, and males of the species are presumed to have possessed these. The anal fin was supported by a plate of cartilage, and was rounded in shape.

=== Spines and dermal denticles ===
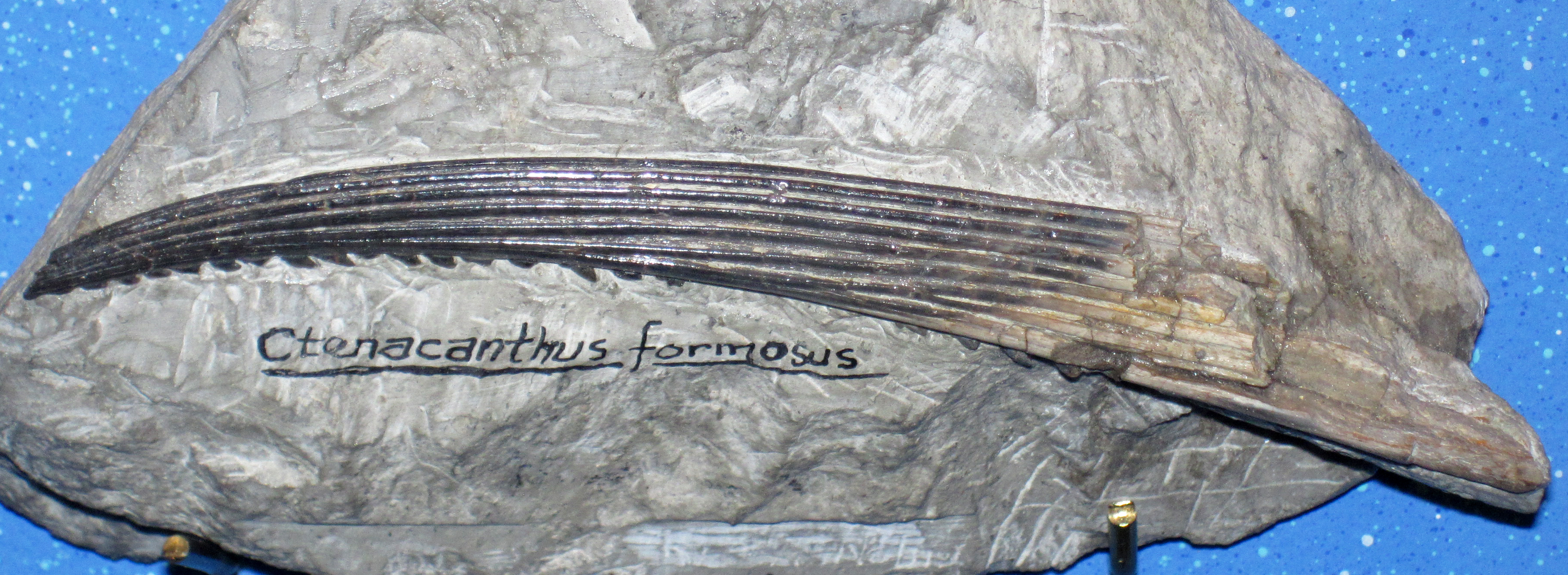
Large, ornamented dorsal spines of ctenacanths, such as Ctenacanthus (pictured) and Dracopristis, are a defining feature of the group

Compared to its relatives, Dracopristis possessed proportionally very large dorsal fin spines. In the holotype specimen, the first dorsal fin spine is roughly 57 cm (22 in) long (about 27% of the length of the body), while the shorter second dorsal fin spine is roughly 40 cm (16 in) long. Both spines are ornamented with rows of small, rounded denticles along their lateral sides and two rows of larger, recurved denticles along their anterior sides. The first spine is strongly swept backwards, while the second is much straighter. Both dorsal spines articulate with the basal cartilages of the dorsal fins.

The skin was coated in fine dermal denticles, the size and shape of which varied depending on their position on the body. The largest of these were leaf-shaped and distributed along the back of the head, whereas smaller denticles were present along the fins and rostrum. The bases of the dermal denticles were wide, and while they were tightly packed they did not overlap with one another. Denticles up to 5 mm (0.20 in) in diameter were present within the mouth and gill basket.

=== Teeth ===
The largest teeth of D. hoffmanorum could reach up to 1.6 cm (0.63 in) in width, and were arranged into 12 laterally positioned rows. Their appearance is similar to those of other ctenacanthiforms such as Glikmanius and Heslerodus in sharing a cladodont (multi-cusped) crown morphology and a d-shaped base (or root). Unlike other known ctenacanths, however, the cusps on the teeth of Dracopristis are relatively short, broad, and triangular in shape. The teeth possess five cusps each, with the central cusp being more than twice the height of the outer four. The tooth cusps are ornamented with multiple rows of denticles down their length in a unique arrangement. The dentition is morphologically homodont (teeth do not vary in shape), although the rows of teeth do decrease in size further back into the mouth. The teeth on the frontmost row are over twice the crown height of those of the backmost row. In the 2021 description, it is suggested that the teeth were shed very slowly.

== Classification ==
- Elasmobranchii
  - Thrinacoselache
  - Doliodus
  - - Cladoselache
    - - Squatinactis
      - - Triodus
        - Orthacanthus
        - - Dracopristis
          - Ctenacanthus
          - - Homalodontus
            - Hopleacanthus
            - - Wodnika
              - - Tristychius
                - Surcaudalus
                - Bandringa
                - Sphenacanthus
                - - Gansuselache
                  - Onychoselache
                  - Hamiltonicthys

Phylogenetic position of D. hoffmanorum as reconstructed by Hodnett and colleagues in 2021.

Dracopristis was part of the chondrichthyan order Ctenacathiformes, which were likely part of the subclass Elasmobranchii and were thus relatives of living sharks and rays. Despite often being informally called "sharks", ctenacanths were outside of the division Selachii and are not considered true sharks. Compared with sharks, the ctenacanths had greatly enlarged ornamented fin spines, proportionally large mouths, and an immobile jaw. Genera such as Bandringa and Sphenacanthus (traditionally considered ctenacanthiforms) have been recovered elsewhere within the Euselachii, indicating the group as traditionally defined may not be monophyletic (a natural group). Rather than being elasmobranchs, it has alternatively been suggested that ctenacanths instead diverged much earlier and were on the stem of Chondrichthyes.

In the 2021 description of Dracopristis hoffmanorum, cladistic analyses were performed which found that the genus was most closely related to the Devonian genus Ctenacanthus. It was also suggested that ctenacanthiforms are closer to crown group euselachians than to other cladodont chondricthyans such as Symmoriiformes. In a 2024 paper describing the ctenacanths Troglocladodus trimblei and Glikmanius careforum, Hodnett and coauthors placed Dracopristis in the newly-erected family Heslerodidae alongside the genera Glikmanius, Heslerodus, Avonacanthus, and Kaibabvenator.

== Paleoecology and paleobiology ==
During the Pennsylvanian, New Mexico was covered by a vast seaway. Dracopristis would have lived in the shallow coastal waters of this seaway, and probably would have been an ambush predator. It may have hunted small animals such as fish and crustaceans, and its teeth show adaptations for grasping and crushing prey. As in other ctenacanths, its dorsal fin spines may have served as protection from larger predators. The shape of Dracopristis' pectoral fins suggests it lived a nektobenthic (bottom dwelling) lifestyle, due to similarities to those of living benthic sharks. D. hoffmanorum may have been a specialist of brackish water habitats, and its ecology has been compared with that of the bull shark and common sawfish.

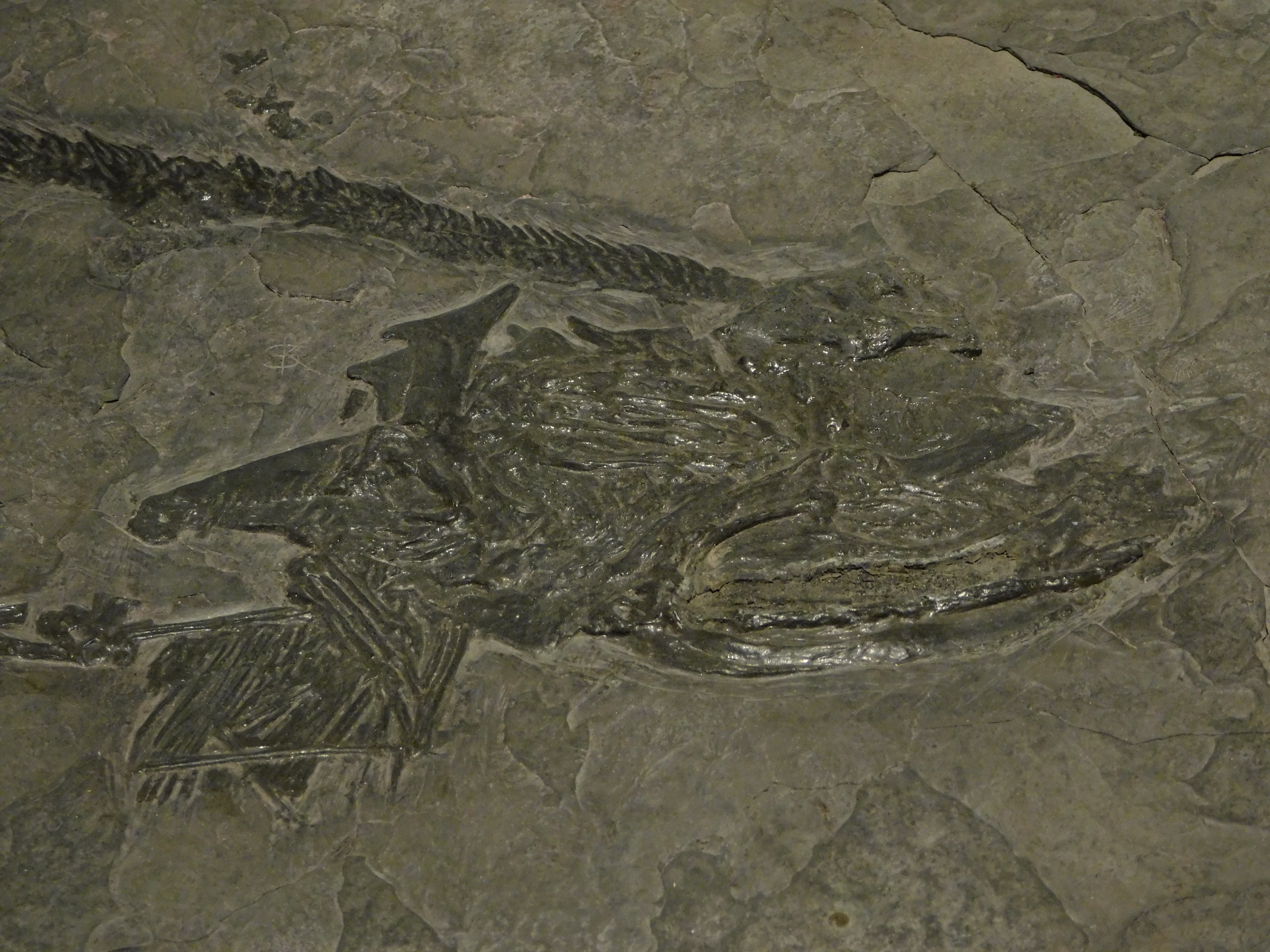
The articulated remains of a large symmoriiform similar to Cobelodus, discovered at the Kinney Brick Quarry

During the Carboniferous, the Atrasado Formation consisted of estuarine and lagoonal habitats, evidenced by fish specimens which show adaptations to both freshwater and marine environments. The detailed preservation of many of the Kinney Brick Quarry fossils may have been the result of an anoxic zone which prevented scavengers from disturbing them. Dracopristis shared the estuary with the larger, related ctenacanthiform Glikmanius occidentalis, which may have preyed upon it. The quarry has also yielded numerous specimens of the filter feeding acanthodian Acanthodes, symmoriiforms similar to Cobelodus, hybodonts, holocephalans, ray-finned palaeonisciformes, lungfish, coelacanths, and megalichthyoforms. Rarer genera, such as the large eugeneodont (whorl-tooth shark) Campyloprion and the aforementioned Glikmanius, might have only occasionally migrated into the estuary from deeper, marine habitats. In total, more than 31 other distinct fish genera are known from the site, and it is considered one of the most diverse and well preserved fossil fish faunas in the Southwestern United States.

== See also ==
- List of prehistoric cartilaginous fish genera
