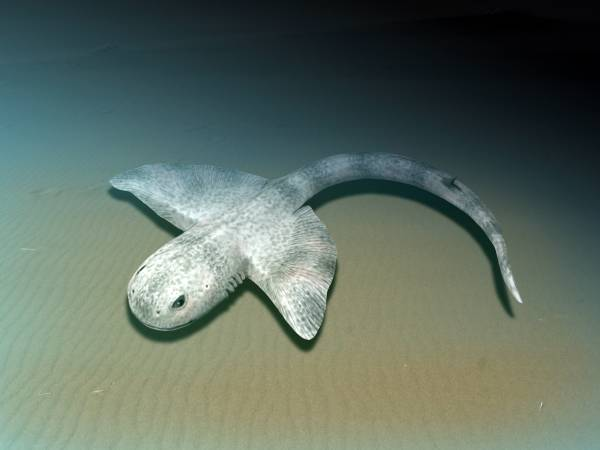
- Life reconstruction of Squatinactis
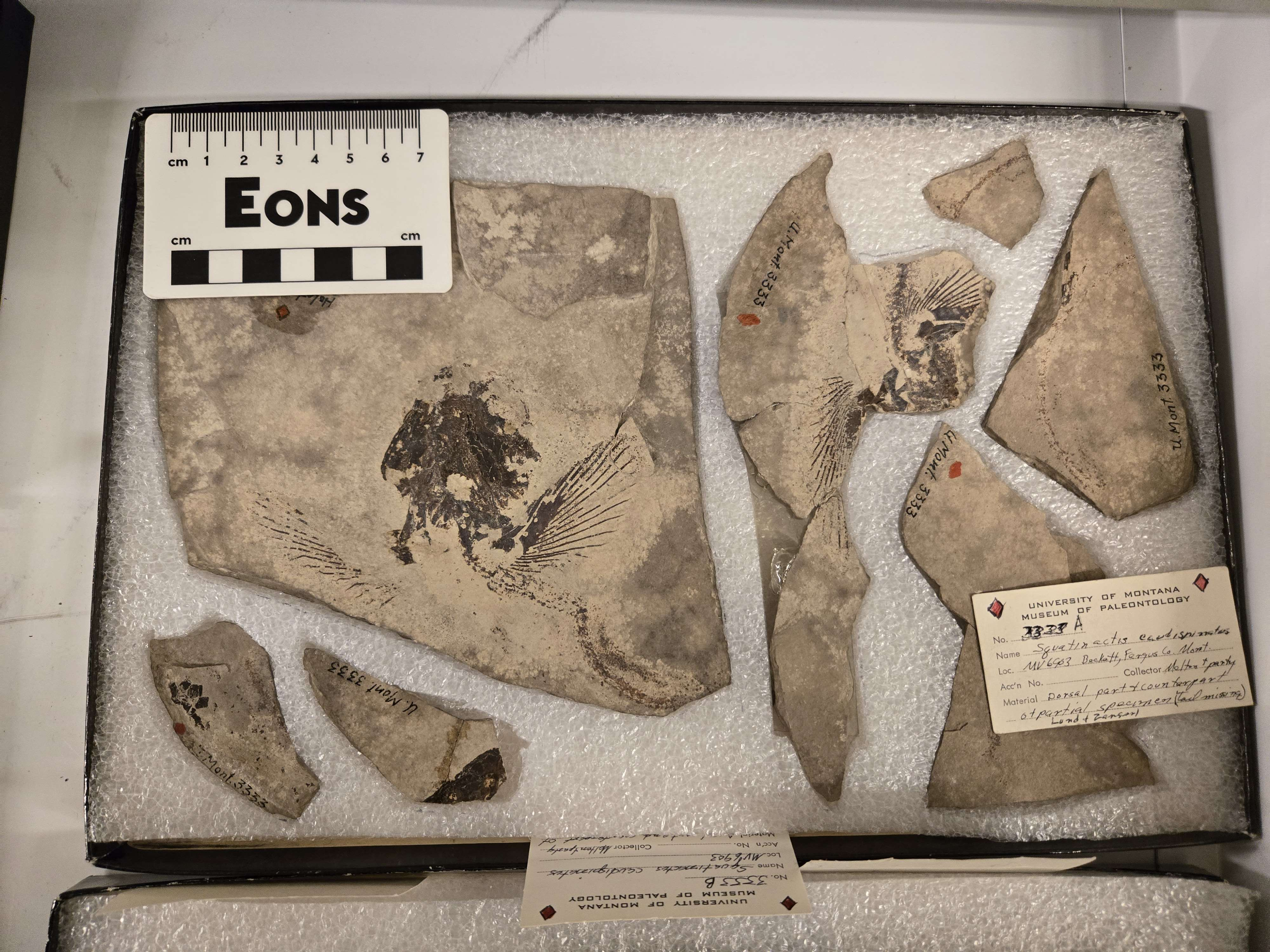
- S. caudispinatus specimen, missing the whip-like tail

Scientific classification
- Kingdom: Animalia
- Phylum: Chordata
- Class: Chondrichthyes
- Clade: Euselachii
- Subclass: Elasmobranchii; Zangerl, 1981
- Order: †Squatinactiformes; Cappetta et al., 1993
- Family: †Squatinactidae; Lund and Zangerl, 1974
- Genus: †Squatinactis; Lund and Zangerl, 1974

Species
- S. caudispinatus Lund and Zangerl, 1974 (type); S. glabrum Ginter, 1999; S. multicuspidatus Ivanov et al., 2023

= Squatinactis =

Squatinactis Temporal range: Upper Serpukhovian to beginning of Bashkirian

Extinct genus of cartilaginous fishes

Squatinactis is a genus of extinct elasmobranch chondrichthyan known from the Carboniferous aged Bear Gulch Limestone in Montana. This fish was discovered in 1974 by Richard Lund. The type specimen, named CMNH 46133, consists of a brain case, poorly preserved jaws and gills, a pectoral fin, and a partial vertebral axis. This creature's most startling feature were its broad pectoral fins which resembled those of stingrays and angel sharks (Squatina). The holotype specimen has about 15 teeth in its jaw. This creature is named after the angel shark. Remains found in the South Urals of Russia and the Eyam Limestone of Derbyshire, England, have been tentatively identified as those belonging to S. caudispinatus.

== Description ==
Squatinactis had a flattened body with a set of large pectoral fins. This fish was vaguely similar to today's stingrays and angel sharks. The fins were oddly pointed forward, with a length of around two feet long. It also had a long, whip-like tail with a spine (a feature analogous to some rays) that was actually a modified, secondary dorsal fin. The snout was short and the wide mouth was equipped with a series of long conical cladodont-shaped teeth. The body was covered in a few placoid scales, but most of the surface was bare.

== Classification ==
Because of the bizarre nature of Squatinactis, it is somewhat difficult to classify. In the original study conducted in 1974, Lund noted that the teeth of this fish are Cladodont is design, however the term "cladodont" is used to describe many Paleozoic chondrichthyans based on their teeth and not phylogeny (including Cladoselache, Ctenacanthus, and Dracopristis). This fish is currently classified within the Elasmobranchii, more specially in its own grouping, the Squatinactiformes.

- Elasmobranchii
  - Thrinacoselache
  - Doliodus
  - - Cladoselache
    - - Squatinactis
      - - Triodus
        - Orthacanthus
        - - Dracopristis
          - Ctenacanthus
          - - Homalodontus
            - Hopleacanthus
            - - Wodnika
              - - Tristychius
                - Surcaudalus
                - Bandringa
                - Sphenacanthus
                - - Gansuselache
                  - Onychoselache
                  - Hamiltonicthys

Phylogenetic position of S. caudispinatus as reconstructed by Hodnett & Grogan 2021.

== Ecology ==
This fish was probably a benthic predator; it probably lived half-buried in the sand and suddenly emerged to throw itself against the prey swimming nearby. The wing-like fins and long tail were most likely useful for propulsion from the seabed. The flattened body plan is typical of bottom-dwelling predators, and is known in a large number of cartilaginous fish, both extinct and extant.
