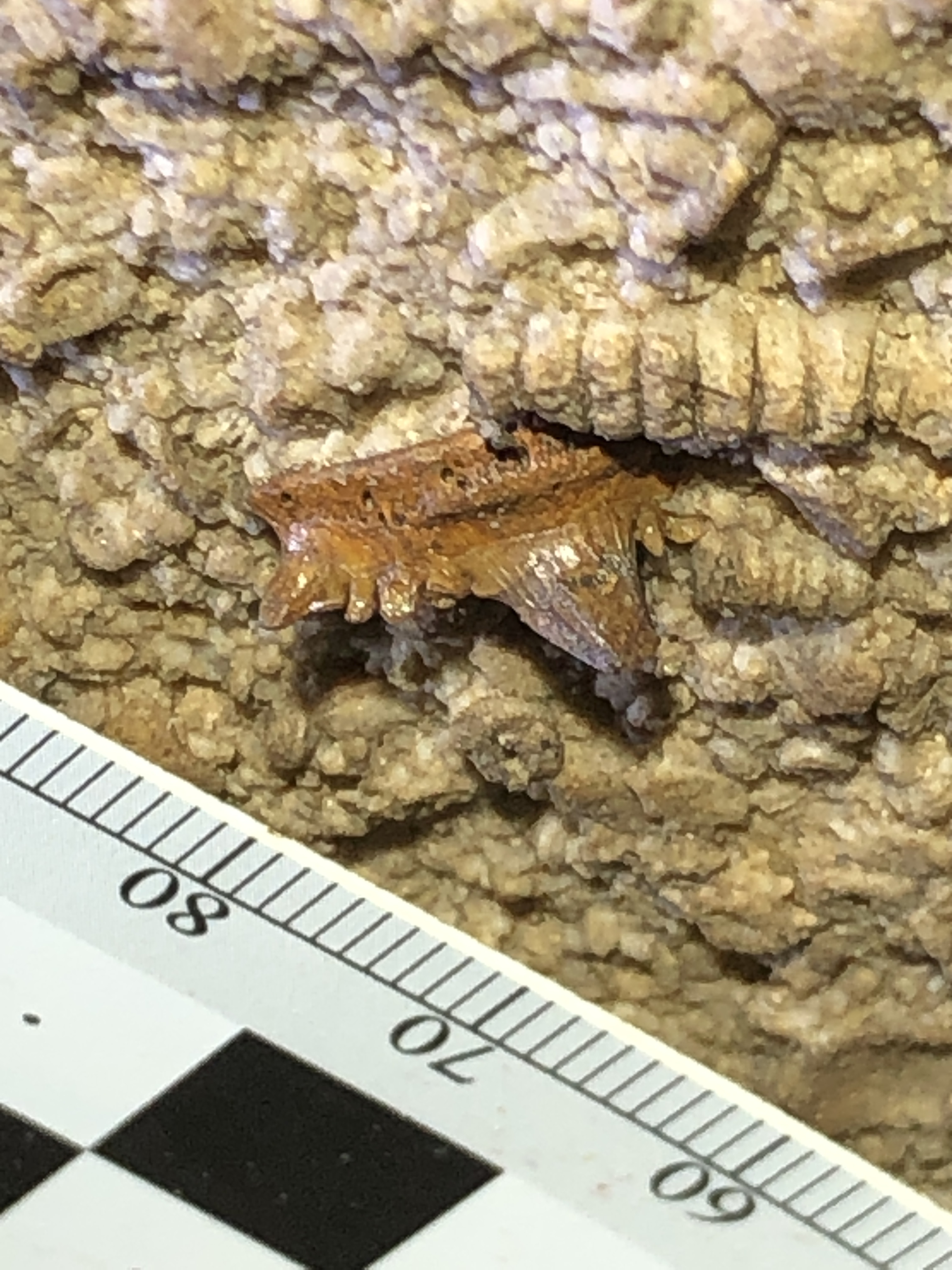
- A tooth of Troglocladodus trimblei from Mammoth Cave.

Scientific classification
- Kingdom: Animalia
- Phylum: Chordata
- Class: Chondrichthyes
- Subclass: Elasmobranchii
- Order: †Ctenacanthiformes
- Family: †Ctenacanthidae
- Genus: †Troglocladodus; Hodnett et al., 2024

Species
- Troglocladodus trimblei Hodnett et al., 2024

= Troglocladodus =

Troglocladodus Temporal range: Mississippian

Extinct genus of cartilaginous fishes

Troglocladodus (meaning 'cave Cladodus' or 'cave branching-tooth') is an extinct genus of cartilaginous fish in the family Ctenacanthidae. Remains are known from limestone deposits in Mammoth Cave National Park and Alabama, which have been dated to the Mississippian subperiod of the Carboniferous period. A single species has been identified, Troglocladodus trimblei, which is named in honor of Barclay Trimble who discovered the holotype specimen of the genus.

== Discovery and naming ==
Troglocladodus trimblei was named in 2024 by John-Paul M. Hodnett and coauthors. The genus and species are known from isolated teeth found in limestones of the St. Louis Formation and overlying Ste. Genevieve Formation within the Mammoth Cave System in the U.S. state of Kentucky, as well as from the Bangor Formation of Franklin County, Alabama. The Mammoth Cave material has been dated to the Visean stage of the Mississippian subperiod, while the Bangor Formation material is dated to the younger Serpukhovian stage. Of the seven specimens assigned in the taxon's formal description, a complete tooth, catalogued as MACA 62062, was made the holotype.

The genus name is derived from the Greek roots τρώγλη or trṓglē (meaning 'cave' or 'hole'), κλάδος or kládos (meaning 'branch') and ὀδούς or odoús (meaning 'tooth'), and can be literally translated as 'cave branching tooth' or 'cave Cladodus' (a similar genus of extinct fish). The only known species, C. trimblei, is named in honor of Barclay Trimble, who discovered the holotype specimen and who is the superintendent of Mammoth Cave National Park.

== Description ==
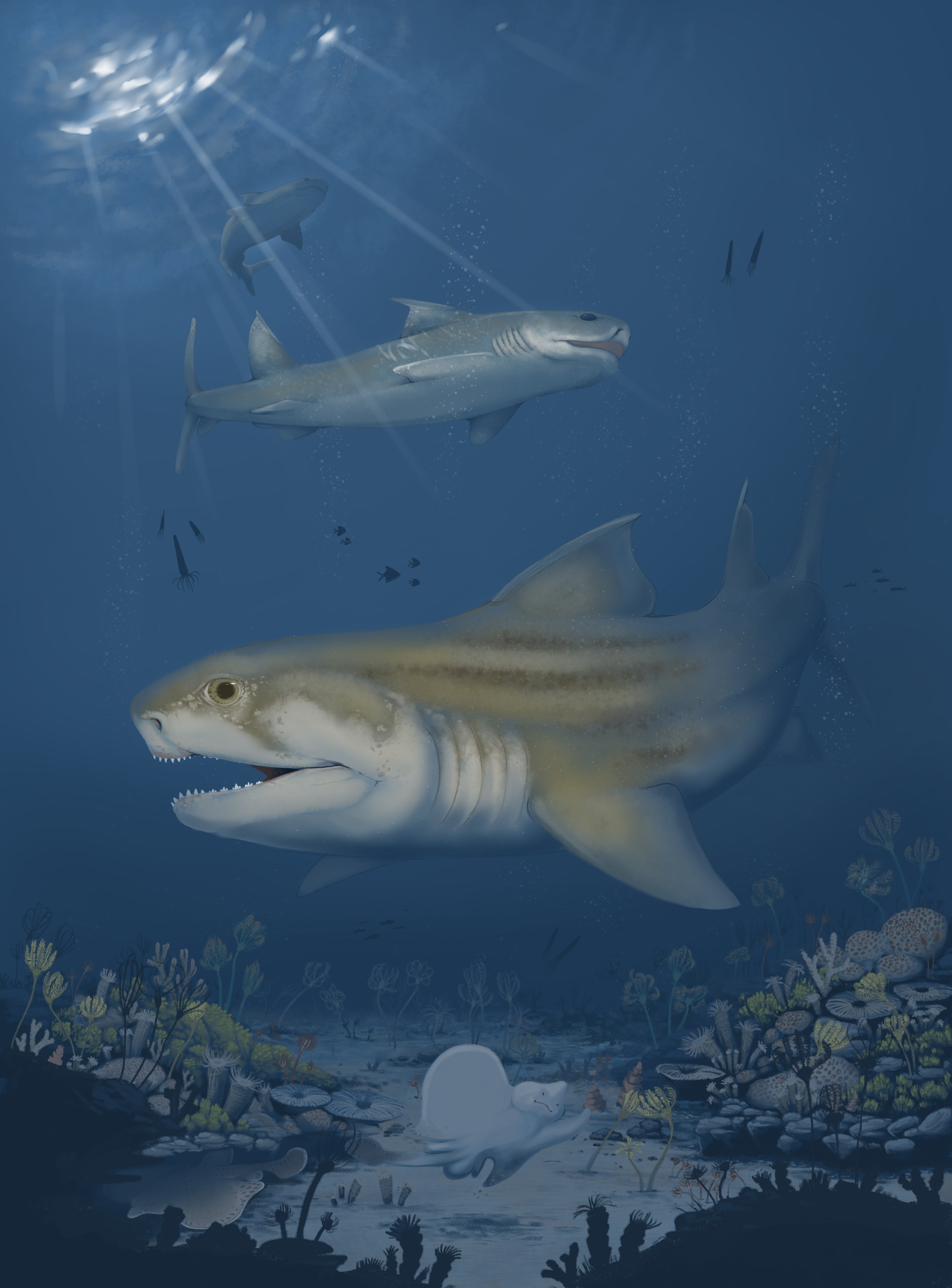
Life reconstructions of Troglocladodus (above) and Glikmanius (below)

The genus is known only from isolated teeth up to 2.3 centimeters (0.91 in) in height. These teeth are cladodont, meaning they have a tooth crown with multiple cusps, and have a tall median cusp protruding from the center of the tooth and 1-4 shorter cusps to each side. The outer surface of the tooth crown is covered in a layer of enameloid.

While the body is unknown, Hodnett and coauthors estimated a body length of 3 meters (9.8 ft), and subsequent reports suggest lengths of up to 3.7 meters (12 ft).

== Classification ==
Troglocladodus is a member of the order Ctenacanthiformes and the family Ctenacanthidae, and Hodnett and coauthors suggest that it is likely closely related to the genus Goodrichthys.

== Paleobiology and paleoecology ==
Troglocladodus was a predator, and adaptations of its teeth may suggest it was specialized to catch shelled prey such as arthropods or shelled cephalopods.

The fossil sites which yield Troglocladodus fossils were deposited in shallow marine environments, which were inhabited by a variety of other cartilaginous fish as well as invertebrates such as blastoids, brachiopods, bryozoans, crinoids and corals.

== See also ==
- List of prehistoric cartilaginous fish genera
