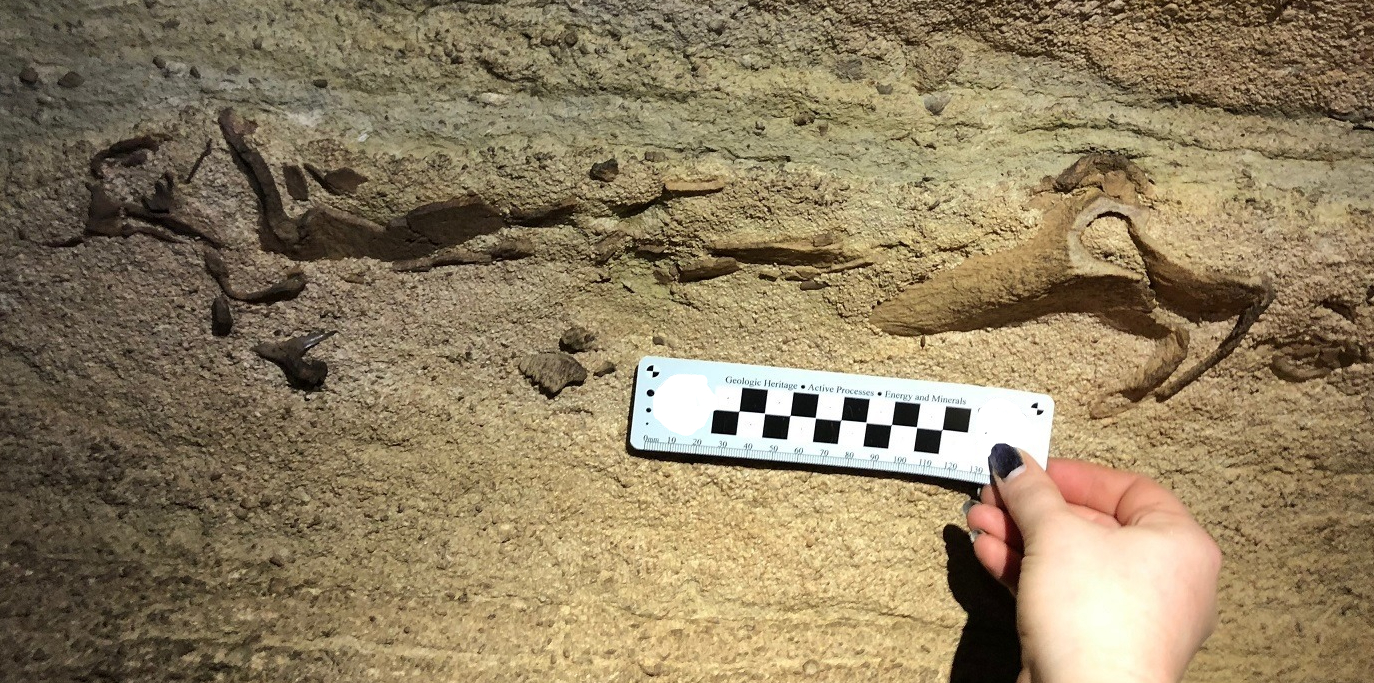
- Preserved cranial material of S. striatus found at Mammoth Cave

Scientific classification
- Kingdom: Animalia
- Phylum: Chordata
- Class: Chondrichthyes
- Subclass: Elasmobranchii
- Order: †Ctenacanthiformes
- Genus: †Saivodus; Duffin & Ginter, 2006
- Species: †S. striatus

Binomial name
- †Saivodus striatus Agassiz, 1843

Synonyms
- †Cladodus corrugatus; †Cladodus curtus; †Cladodus eccentricus; †Cladodus ferox; †Cladodus grandis; †Cladodus hornei; †Cladodus magnificus; †Cladodus prototypus; †Cladodus spinosus; †Cladodus striatus; †Ctenacanthus ishii

= Saivodus =

Saivodus Temporal range: Mississippian–Lopingian

Extinct genus of fish

Saivodus is an extinct genus of ctenacanthiform fish that existed during the Carboniferous and Permian periods. Fossils have been found in Ireland, Scotland, England, Belgium, Morocco, the disputed Kashmir area, and the United States.

== Taxonomy ==
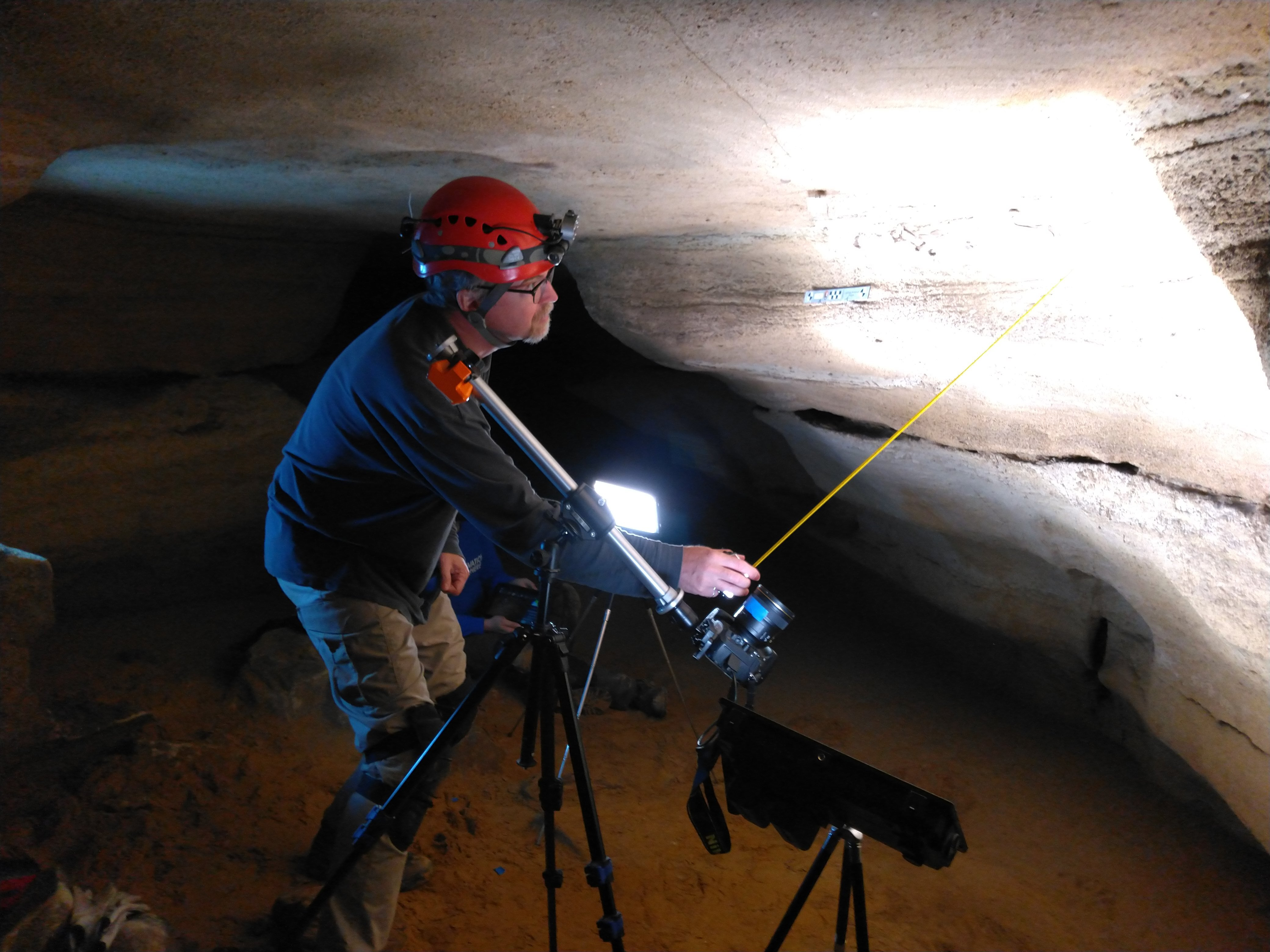
Preserved jaw cartilage found in Mammoth Cave being scanned via photogrammetry

Saivodus was erected in 2006 after an anatomical and taxonomic review of Ctenacanthiform dentition specimens by Paleontologists Dr. Christopher Duffin and Dr. Michał Ginter. The species belonging to this genus were formerly included in the two unrelated genera Cladodus and Ctenacanthus.

The species Saivodus striatus is currently the only formally described and named species of the genus. However, other unnamed species of the Saivodus genus are known. An unnamed Saivodus species is known from deposits from the Fossil Mountain Member of the Permian (Kungurian) Kaibab Formation near Flagstaff, Arizona, U.S.

Multiple Saivodus sp. teeth specimens discovered in Late Permian (Changhsingian) age deposits of the Permian-Triassic Zewan Formation at the Guryul Ravine of Kashmir (a disputed territory between India and Pakistan) might also represent a new species of the Saivodus genus. The Zewan Formation Saivodus sp. is currently the geologically youngest member of the genus.

== Description ==
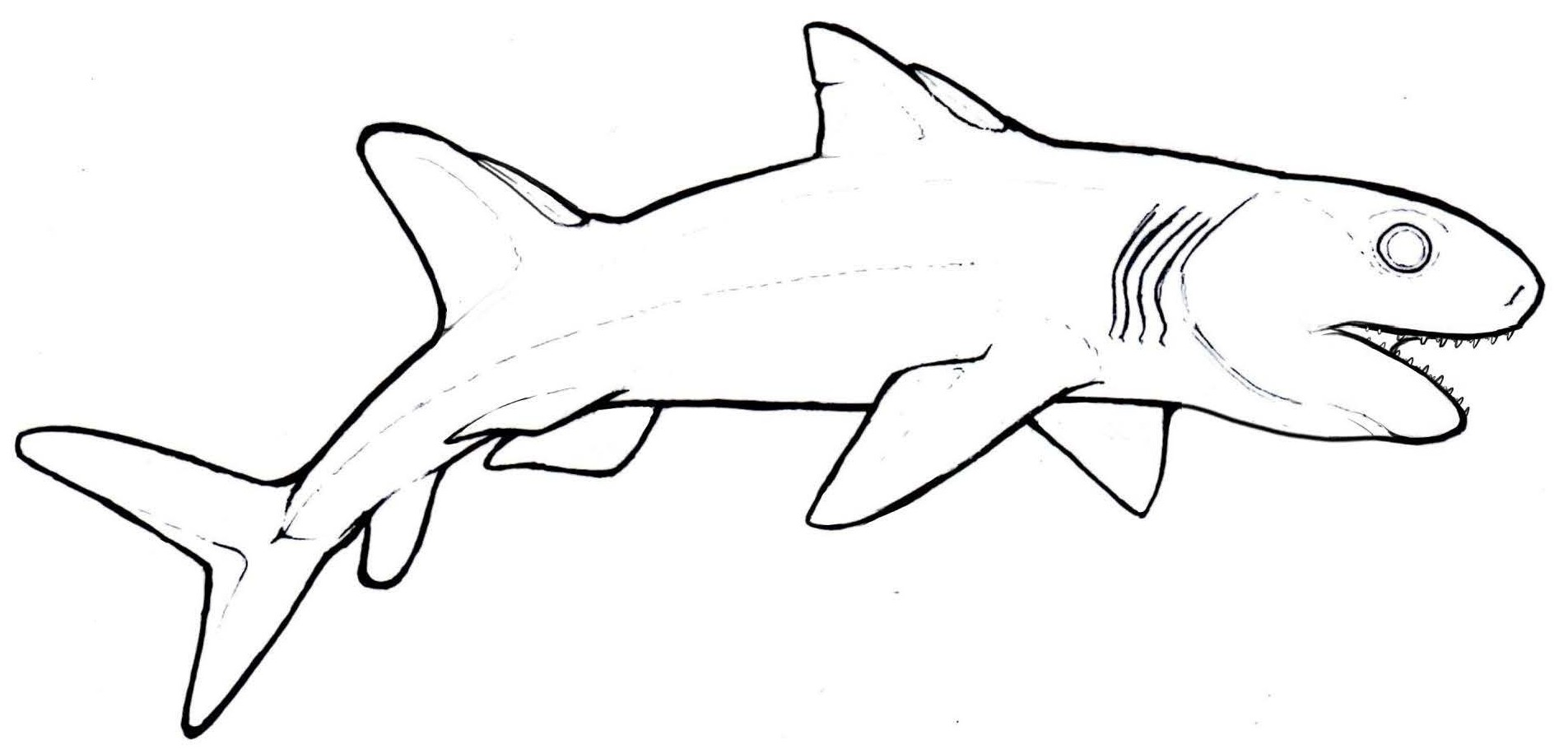
Reconstruction of S. striatus

Saivodus is the largest known member of its group measuring 4–5 metres (13–16 ft) or more in total body length, possibly even up to 6–7 metres (20–23 ft), based on individual teeth about 3 centimetres (1.2 in) or more in length. The shape of the teeth suggest it targeted soft-bodied prey. The cartilage jaws of Saivodus are 60 centimetres (24 in) in total length.
