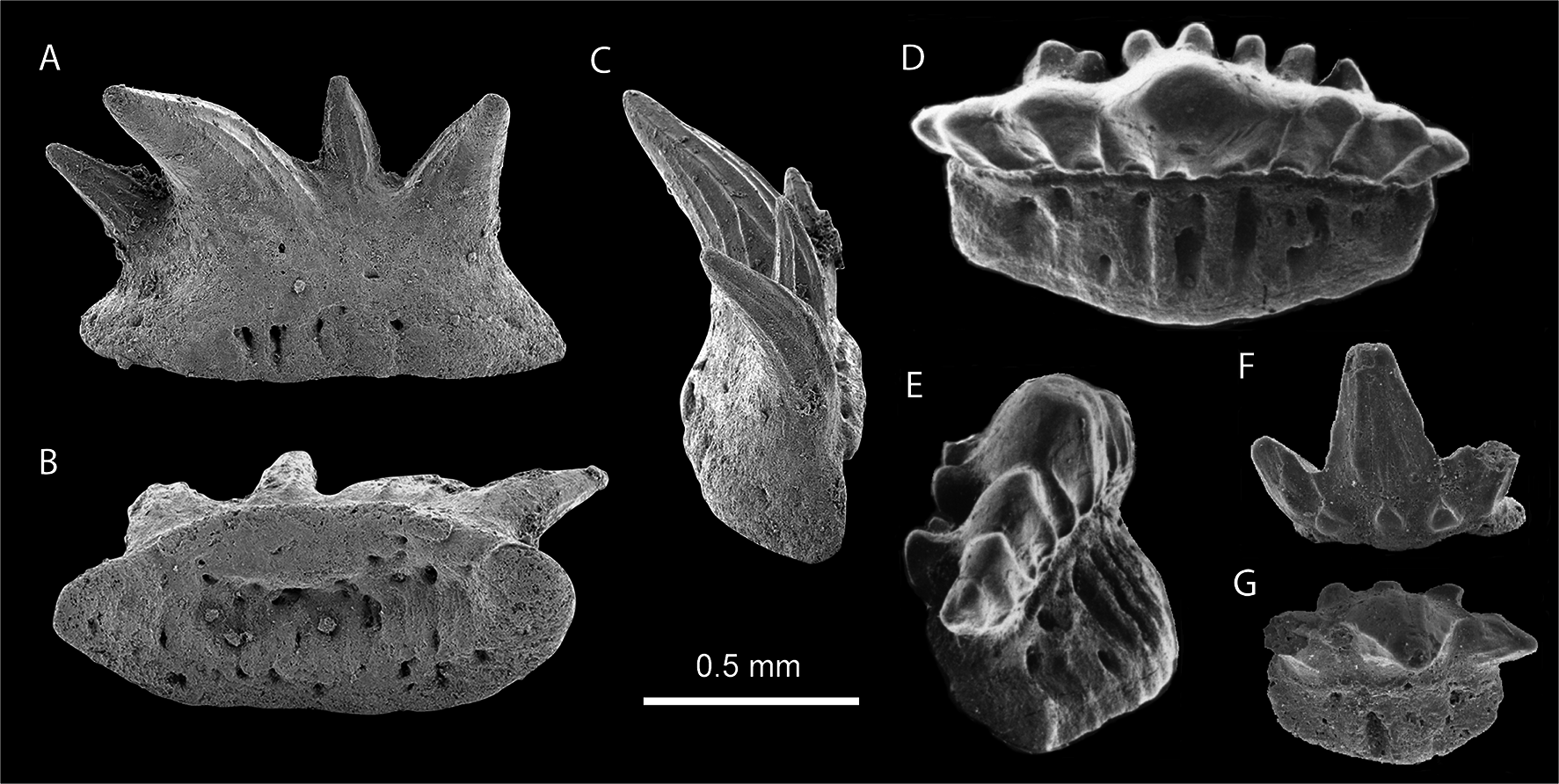
- Teeth of Arduodens flammeus (A–C) and Deihim mansureae (D–G)

Scientific classification
- Kingdom: Animalia
- Phylum: Chordata
- Class: Chondrichthyes
- Subclass: Elasmobranchii
- Order: †Ctenacanthiformes
- Family: †Ctenacanthidae
- Genus: †Arduodens; Hairapetian & Ginter, 2009

= Arduodens =

Arduodens Temporal range: Frasnian–Famennian

Extinct genus of cartilaginous fishes

Arduodens is an extinct genus of ctenacanth fish from the Devonian period. Its name is derived from the Latin Arduus meaning steep and dens meaning tooth. It is currently known from a singular species, A. flammeus. It was described from isolated cladodont teeth found in deposits from the upper Frasnian to lower Fammenian of central Iran. The specific epithet is derived from the Latin for "flamming."
