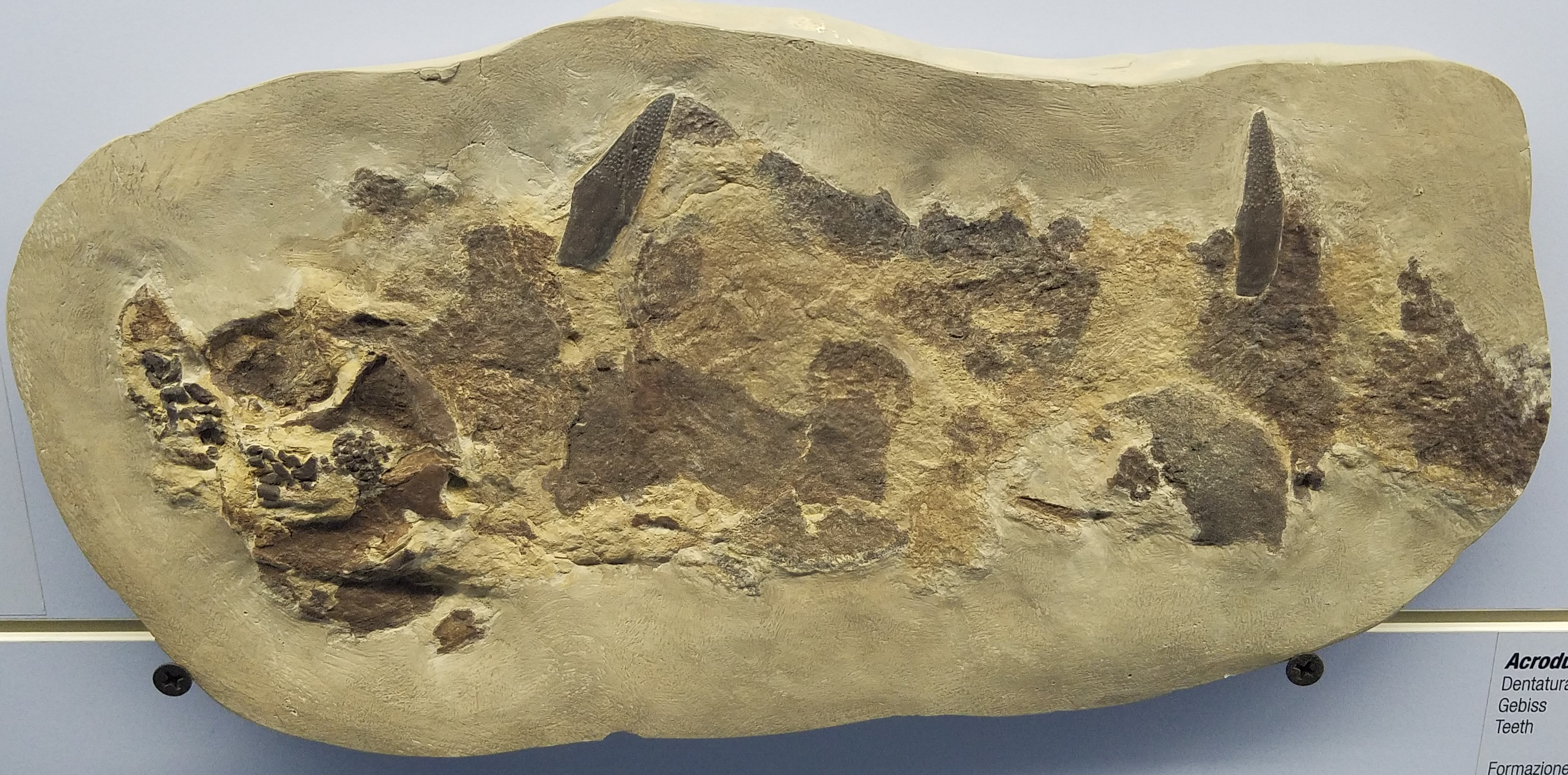
- A cast of a well-preserved fossil of Acronemus tuberculatus from Monte San Giorgio

Scientific classification
- Kingdom: Animalia
- Phylum: Chordata
- Clade: Eugnathostomata
- Class: Chondrichthyes
- Clade: Euselachii
- Genus: †Acronemus; Rieppel, 1982

= Acronemus =

Acronemus Temporal range: Anisian

Enigmatic extinct genus of cartilaginous fish

Acronemus is an extinct genus of euselachian from the Middle Triassic of Switzerland. It is an enigmatic genus with uncertain relations to other groups. Though originally placed within Ctenacanthiformes, it is now considered Euselachii incertae sedis, due to its mixture of features similar to hybodontiforms and neoselachians. Originally, teeth from this genus were attributed to "Acrodus bicarinatus" while fin spines were named "Nemacanthus tuberculatus". Associated material showed they were the same animal, with the older specific epithet (tuberculatus) taking precedence. The euselachian was given the new genus Acrocnemus, containing a single species (A. tuberculatus). Acronemus is found in the Anisian-age Grenzbitumenzone (also known as the Besano Formation) of Monte San Giorgio. It was a small animal measuring 30–35 cm (0.98–1.15 ft) long. A 2018 study considered it to be closely related to the early Carboniferous genus Tristychius as part of the family Tristychiidae as a basal euselachian, with hybodonts more closely related to neoselachians than to Tristychiidae.
