= C. angulatus =

C. angulatus may refer to:

- Chomatodus angulatus, a prehistoric fish species
- Cladodus angulatus, a prehistoric fish species
