= Adamantina (fish) =

Adamantina Temporal range: Tournaisian–Wuchiapingian

Scientific classification
- Domain: Eukaryota
- Kingdom: Animalia
- Phylum: Chordata
- Class: Chondrichthyes
- Subclass: Elasmobranchii
- Superorder: †Cladodontomorphi
- Family: †Jalodontidae
- Genus: †Adamantina; Bendix-Almgreen, 1993

Type species
- Adamantina benedictae Bendix-Almgreen 1993

Species
- Adamantina benedictae Bendix-Almgreen 1993; Adamantina foliacea Ivanov 1999

Extinct genus of cartilaginous fishes

Adamantina is an extinct genus of jalodont chondrichthyan from the Carboniferous and Permian periods. It is known mainly from isolated teeth and scales. It contains two species, A. foliacea and A. benedictae. The type species, A. benedictae, is known from the Wuchiapingian of east Greenland and the Roadian of the Kanin Peninsula, Russia. A. foliacea is known from the late Tournaisian, late Artinskian, and the early Asselian of Russia and the late Kasimovian of Iowa, United States. There is also a likely occurrence in the upper Pennsylvanian of Brazil.
