= Glencartius =

Glencartius Temporal range: Visean

Scientific classification
- Kingdom: Animalia
- Phylum: Chordata
- Class: Chondrichthyes
- Subclass: Elasmobranchii
- Order: †Ctenacanthiformes
- Genus: †Glencartius; Ginter and Skompski, [2019]
- Species: †G. costellatus

Binomial name
- †Glencartius costellatus (Traquair, 1884)

Extinct genus of ctenacanthiform chondrichthyan

Glencartius is an extinct monotypic genus of ctenacanthiform chondrichthyan that lived during the Visean stage of the Carboniferous period.

== Taxonomy ==
Glencartius costellatus, the type and only species, was originally described in 1884 as part of the genus Ctenacanthus. Its exact phylogenetic placement is unresolved.
