= Avonacanthus =

Avonacanthus Temporal range: lower Carboniferous

Scientific classification
- Kingdom: Animalia
- Phylum: Chordata
- Class: Chondrichthyes
- Subclass: Elasmobranchii
- Order: †Ctenacanthiformes
- Family: †Heslerodidae
- Genus: †Avonacanthus; Maisley, 2010

Prehistoric Cartilaginous fish genus

Avonacanthus is an extinct genus of cartilaginous fish from the lower Carboniferous. The name is derived from the type locality of Avon Gorge, near Bristol, England. It contains a single species, Avonacanthus brevis, which was originally regarded as a species of Ctenacanthus. It is currently known only from fin spines. It is probably a cladistically basal Heslerodid.
