= Amelacanthus =

Amelacanthus Temporal range: Famennian – Induan

Scientific classification
- Kingdom: Animalia
- Phylum: Chordata
- Class: Chondrichthyes
- Subclass: Elasmobranchii
- Order: †Ctenacanthiformes
- Family: †Ctenacanthidae
- Genus: †Amelacanthus; Maisey, 1982

Species
- A. laevis; A. plicatus; A. pustulatus; A. sulcatus

Amelacanthus is an extinct genus of elasmobranchian cartilaginous fish from the Paleozoic era. It is known from fin spines and currently contains four described species. It is known from the Permian and Carboniferous of North America, Europe, and Africa. It is also known from the Famennian of Russia. Specimens of Amelacanthus have additionally been found in Permian (Wordian) and Triassic (Induan) sediments of Oman. This makes Amelacanthus one of the only known Ctenacanths to have survived (albeit only briefly) the Permian-Trassic extinction event, going extinct only in the Early Triassic.
