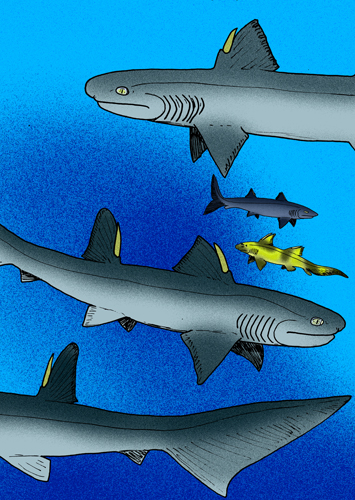
- Comparison of K. swiftae, Diablodontus, and Glikmanius

Scientific classification
- Kingdom: Animalia
- Phylum: Chordata
- Class: Chondrichthyes
- Subclass: Elasmobranchii
- Order: †Ctenacanthiformes
- Family: †Heslerodidae
- Genus: †Kaibabvenator; Hodnett, Elliot, Olson & Wittke, 2012
- Species: †K. swiftae

Binomial name
- †Kaibabvenator swiftae Hodnett et al. 2012

= Kaibabvenator =

Kaibabvenator Temporal range: Permian

Extinct genus of cartilaginous fishes

Kaibabvenator swiftae is a very large, extinct ctenacanthiform fish that lived in marine environments in what is now Arizona, during the Middle Permian Period. K. swiftae is known from large teeth up to 3–5 centimetres (1.2–2.0 in) long found in the Kachina Microsite, of the lower Fossil Mountain Member, in the Kaibab Formation near Flagstaff, Arizona,suggesting a total body length of around 5–6 metres (16–20 ft). Potentially referable material is known from the Phosphoria Formation. The specific name honors researcher Sandra Swift for her paleontological contributions to Northern Arizona University.
