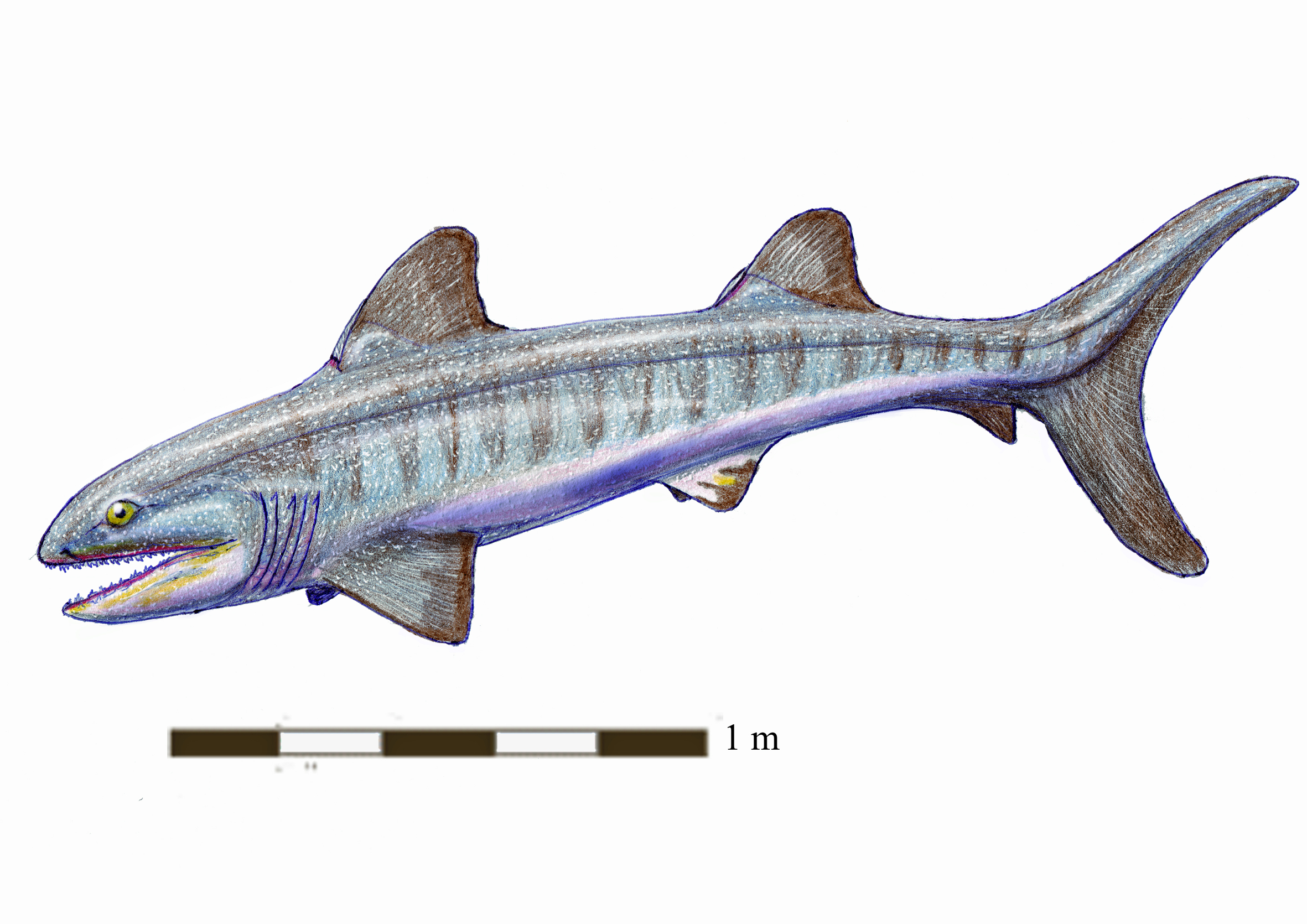
- Restoration

Scientific classification
- Kingdom: Animalia
- Phylum: Chordata
- Class: Chondrichthyes
- Subclass: Elasmobranchii
- Order: †Ctenacanthiformes
- Family: †Ctenacanthidae
- Genus: †Goodrichthys; Moy-Thomas, 1951

= Goodrichthys =

Extinct genus of cartilaginous fish

Goodrichthys is a Carboniferous genus of ctenacanthiform from the Glencartholm Volcanic Beds Formation (Upper Border Group) of Scotland.
