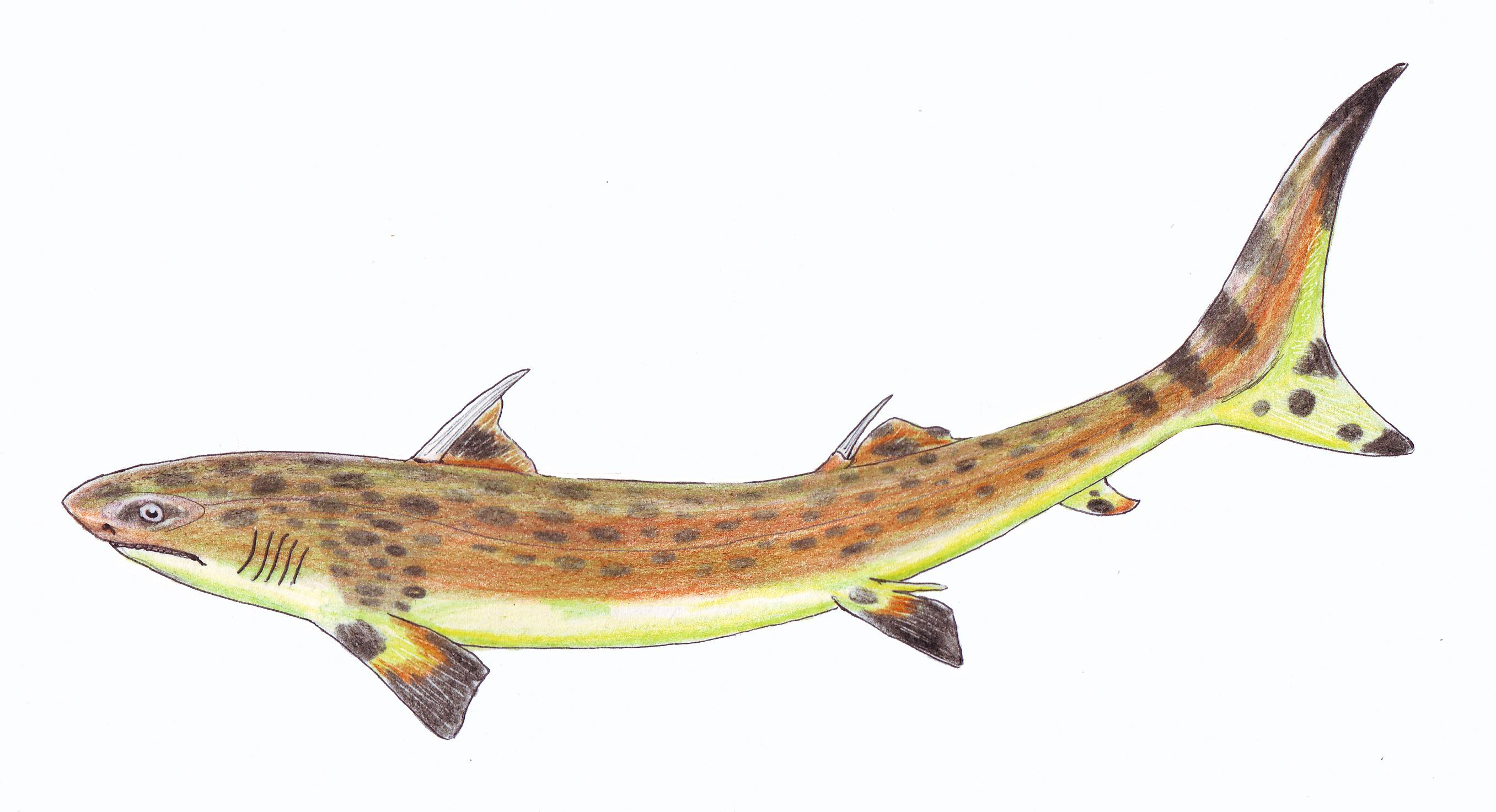
- Wodnika striatula

Scientific classification
- Kingdom: Animalia
- Phylum: Chordata
- Class: Chondrichthyes
- Subclass: Elasmobranchii
- Order: †Ctenacanthiformes
- Superfamily: †Ctenacanthoidea
- Family: †incertae sedis
- Genus: †Wodnika; Münster 1843

Species
- Wodnika althausi; Wodnika ocoyae; Wodnika striatula

Synonyms
- †Radamas Münster 1843

= Wodnika =

Wodnika Temporal range: 259.0–215.97 Ma

Extinct genus of cartilaginous fishes

Wodnika is an extinct genus of cartilaginous fish which lived in the Late Permian period in the present area of Germany and Russia. It measured about 1 m (3.2 ft) in length and its tail shape indicates it was probably a good swimmer. Internally, the cartilage skeleton is preserved on the fossil, which is fairly rare for fossilized shark-like chondrichthyans.
