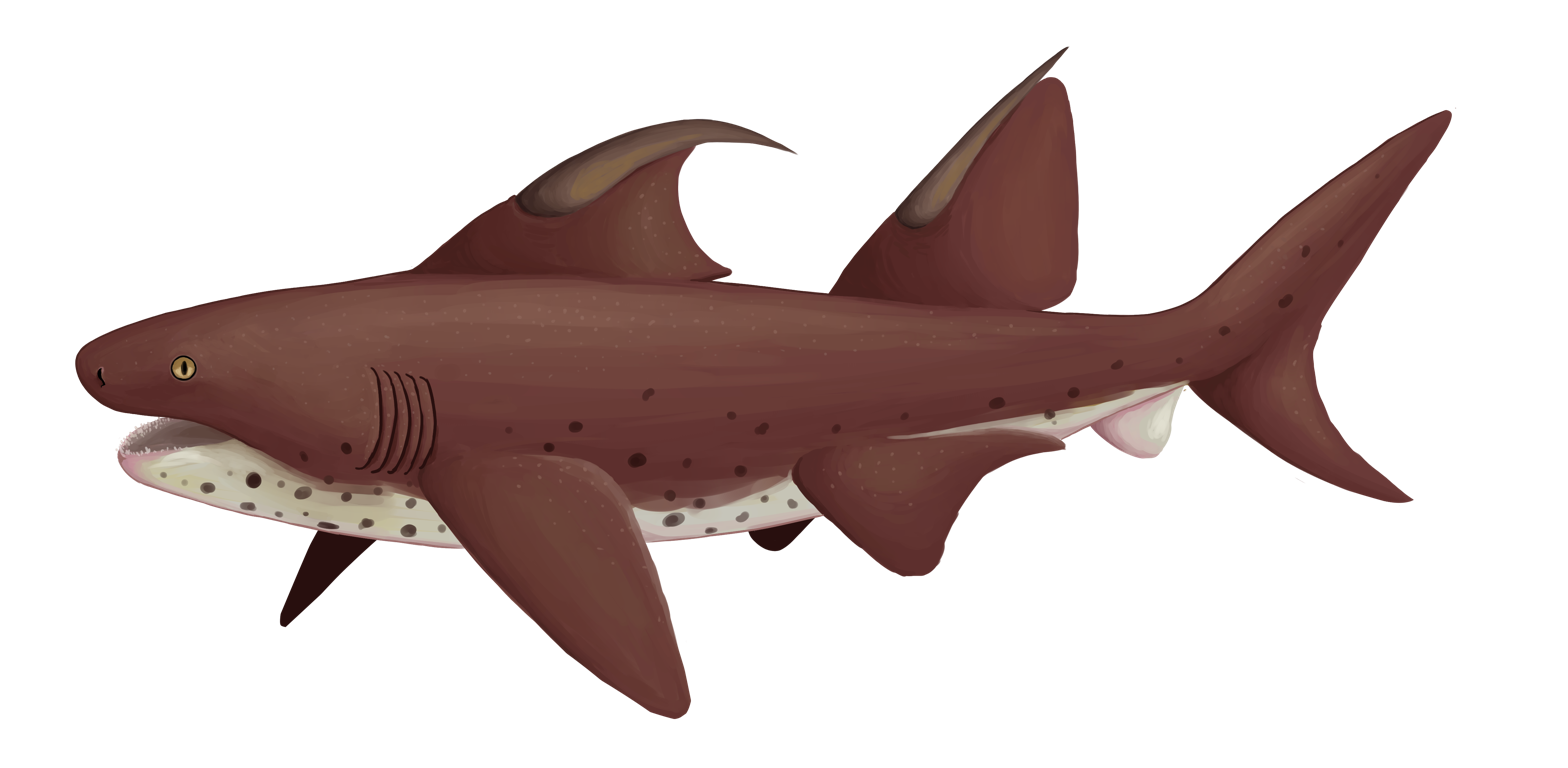
- Life restoration of Dracopristis
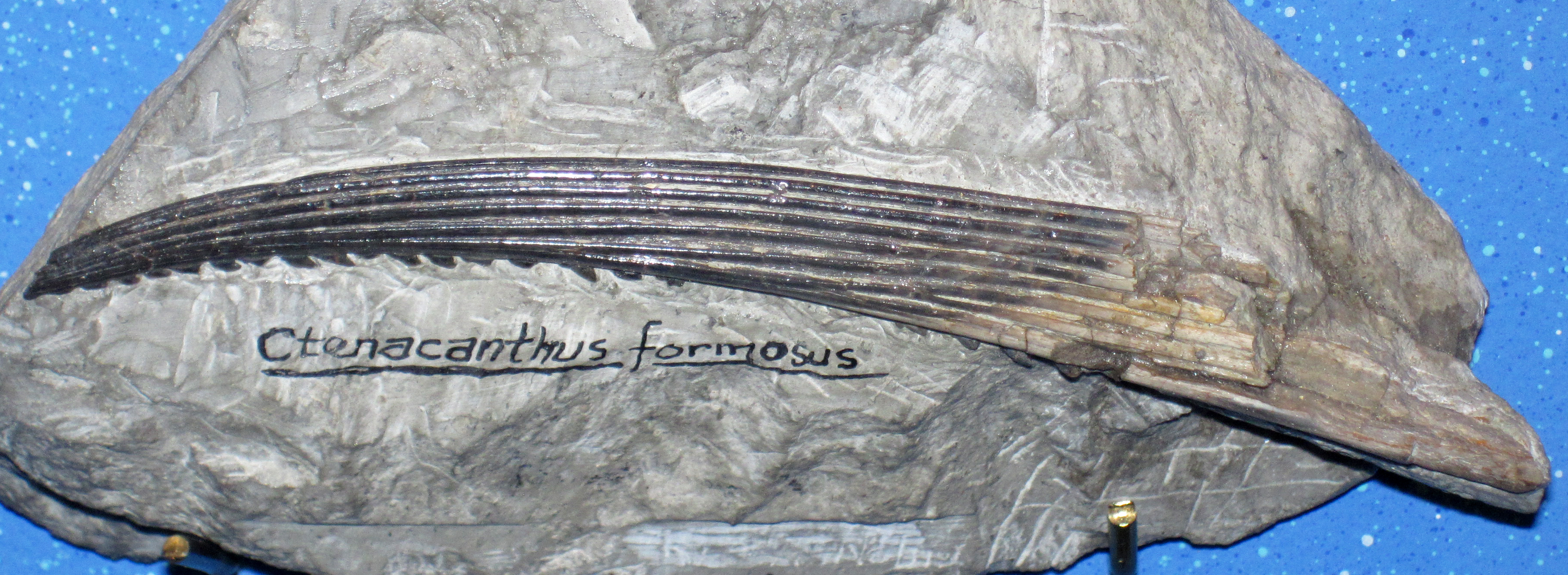
- Fin spine of Ctenacanthus formosus

Scientific classification
- Kingdom: Animalia
- Phylum: Chordata
- Class: Chondrichthyes
- Subclass: Elasmobranchii
- Order: †Ctenacanthiformes; Glikman, 1964

Subtaxa
- See text

Synonyms
- Ctenacanthida Cappetta (1988)

= Ctenacanthiformes =

Ctenacanthiformes Temporal range: 383–246.7 Ma Late Devonian— Early Triassic (Possible Valanginian record)

Extinct order of cartilaginous fishes

Ctenacanthiformes is an extinct order of cartilaginous fish. They possessed ornamented fin spines at the front of their dorsal fins and cladodont-type dentition, that is typically of a grasping morphology, though some taxa developed cutting and gouging tooth morphologies. Some ctenacanths are thought to have reached sizes comparable to the great white shark, with body lengths of up to 7 metres (23 ft) and weights of 1,500–2,500 kilograms (3,300–5,500 lb), while others reached lengths of only 30 centimetres (12 in). The earliest ctenacanths appeared during the Frasnian stage of the Late Devonian (~383-372 million years ago), with the group reaching their greatest diversity during the Early Carboniferous (Mississippian). Their biodiversity entered into a state of decline by the end of the Carboniferous, but were still prominent meso-predators and apex predators in several marine ecosystems well into the Middle Permian (Guadalupian). The youngest confirmed geologic records of the group date to the Early Triassic (Olenekian).

Reports of Ctenacanthiform teeth from the Late Triassic Tiki Formation of Northern India have yet to be independently verified. Some authors have suggested members of the family Ctenacanthidae may have survived into the Cretaceous based on teeth found in deep water deposits of Valanginian age in France and Austria, however, other authors contend that the similarity of these teeth to Paleozoic ctenacanths is only superficial, and they likely belong to neoselachians instead.

== Taxonomy ==
Ctenacanthiformes are suggested to be more closely related to living elasmobranchs (modern sharks and rays) than to Holocephali (which includes living chimaeras), though less closely than euselachians like hybodonts. The monophyly of the Ctenacanthiformes has been questioned, with some studies recovering the group as a whole as paraphyletic or polyphyletic with respect to other groups of total group elasmobranchs like Xenacanthiformes.

Following Hodnett et al. 2024

Ctenacanthidae Dean 1909

- Amelacanthus Maisey, 1982 (Late Devonian-Early Triassic)
- Ctenacanthus Agassiz, 1837 (Late Devonian)
- Cladodoides Maisey, 2001 (Late Devonian-Early Carboniferous)
- Cladodus Agassiz, 1843 (Early Carboniferous)
- Goodrichthys Moy-Thomas, 1951 (Early Carboniferous)
- Troglocladodus Hodnett et al. 2024 (Early Carboniferous)

Heslerodidae Maisey 2010

- Avonacanthus Maisey 2010 (Early Carboniferous)
- Bythiacanthus St. John and Worthen 1875 (Early Carboniferous)
- Dracopristis Hodnett et al. 2021 (Late Carboniferous)
- Glencartius Ginter and Skompski 2019 (Early Carboniferous)
- Glikmanius Ginter et al. 2005 (Early Carboniferous-Middle Permian)
- Heslerodus Ginter 2002 (Late Carboniferous-Middle Permian)
- Heslerodoides Ivanov 2022 (Late Carboniferous)
- Kaibabvenator Hodnett et al. 2012 (Early-Middle Permian)
- Nanoskalme Hodnett et al. 2012 (Early-Middle Permian)

"Saivodus group"

- Tamiobatis Eastman, 1897 (Late Devonian-Early Carboniferous)
- Saivodus Duffin & Ginter, 2006 (Early Carboniferous-Middle Permian, one of the largest ctenacanths, estimated to reach 6–8 metres (20–26 ft) in length)
- Neosaivodus Hodnett et al. 2012 (Middle Permian)

Ctenacanthoidea incertae sedis

- Pyknotylacanthus Mutter-Rieber, 2005 (Early Triassic)
