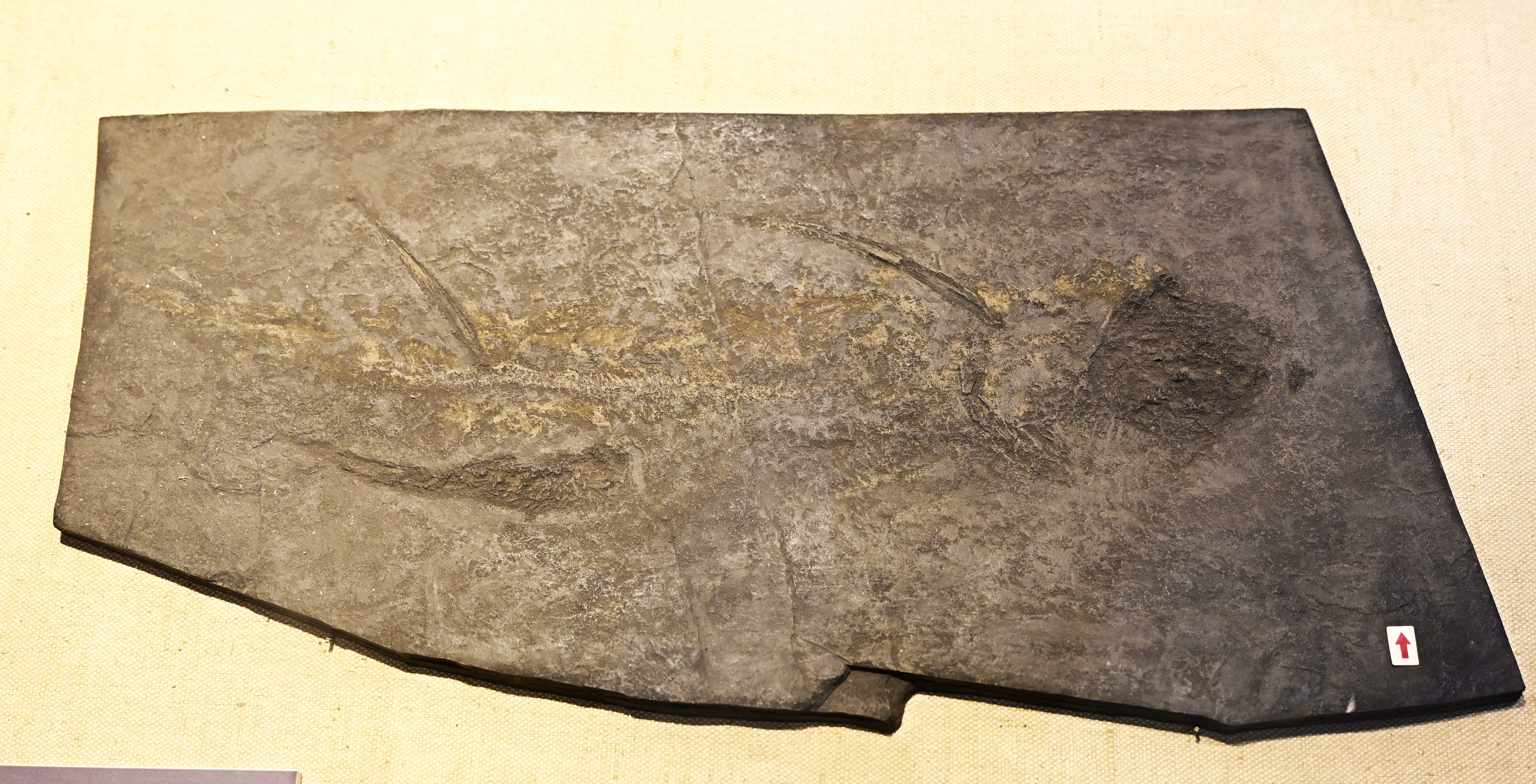
- Holotype specimen (IVPP FV 1977), Paleozoological Museum of China

Scientific classification
- Kingdom: Animalia
- Phylum: Chordata
- Class: Chondrichthyes
- Order: †Hybodontiformes
- Family: †Lonchidiidae (?)
- Genus: †Gansuselache; Wang, Zhang, Zhu, and Zhao, 2009
- Species: †G. tungshengi

Binomial name
- †Gansuselache tungshengi Wang, Zhang, Zhu, and Zhao, 2009

= Gansuselache =

Gansuselache Temporal range: Early Triassic

Extinct genus of cartilaginous fishes

Gansuselache is a genus of extinct elasmobranch in the order Hybodontiformes, comprising one species, Gansuselache tungshengi (monotypy) from Gansu Province (Beishan Hills), China. It is known from Fangshankou Formation, which previously interpreted as Permian in age, but reinterpreted as the Early Triassic in later study. A tooth remain tentatively assigned to this genus is also known from Late Permian strata of Poland.

== Description ==
G. tungshengi is known from a single specimen which is nearly complete and has traces of soft tissue preserved. With a total length reaching 49 centimetres (19 in), it had large spines on two dorsal fins, a feature seen in other hybodontiform sharks, as well as two pairs of cephalic spines with retrorse barbs. The dorsal spines were found to be covered in placoid scales, as well.

Although its classification is still uncertain, Gansuselache is tentatively placed in the family Lonchidiidae on the basis of its tooth morphology. The teeth themselves measure up to 3 mm long, though the tooth base is shorter and deeper than the crown. The crown/root junction on each tooth is at its highest on the labial (lip) side of the tooth, but the overall profile of each tooth is low. Each tooth has a short, slightly pyramid shaped central cusp and up to two pairs of lateral cusplets flanking the central cusp. The closest pair of lateral cusps is well-separated from the main cusp. All cusps on the teeth of this genus are ornamented by vertical ridges across the crown that do not bifurcate. These ridges begin at crown apexes and descend down to the crown's shoulder which is weakly developed compared to the teeth of other hybodontiform genera. There is also a thin horizonal ridge which runs along the crown in the direction of the tongue.

== Paleoecology ==
Gansuselache is known from Fangshankou Formation, which was originally considered as Permian. However, study in 2020 reinterpreted the geologic formation as Early Triassic in age. The Hongyanjing Formation sits at the same stratigraphic horizon, and it is even possible that fossils from both formations were recovered from the locality which produced Gansuselache. Both formations represent lacustrine environment, Although Fangshankou Formation has so far produced only one other fish taxon (an acipenseriform genus, Eochondrosteus), the Hongyanjing Formation produced multiple taxa such as several thousand specimens of actinopterygians (including Beishanichthys, Plesiofuro, Yuchoulepis gansuensis and Boreosomus), other hybodontiform sharks which are evidenced by preserved narial and oral barbels, a cynodont (Beishanodon), lizard-like diapsids, temnospondyls and possible late-surviving lepospondyl.
