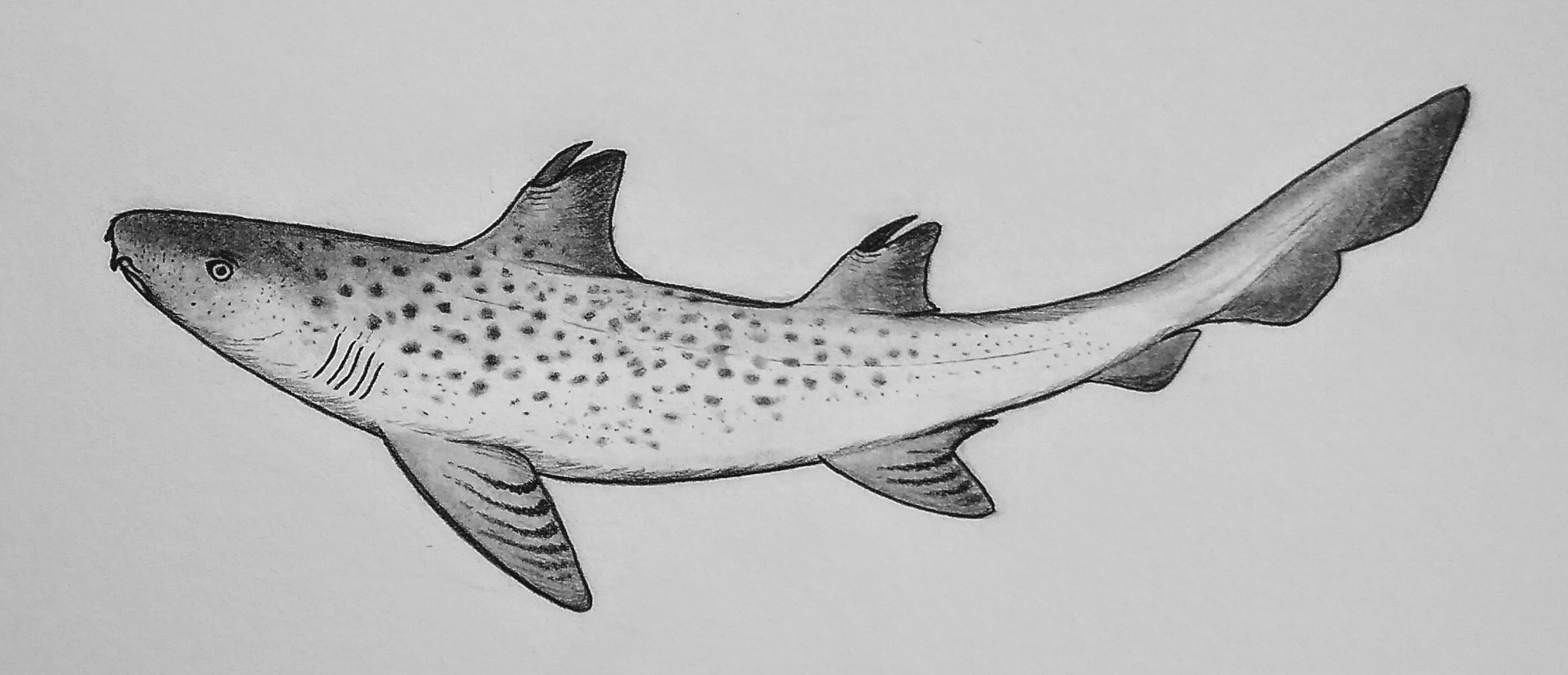
- Restoration of Tristychius

Scientific classification
- Kingdom: Animalia
- Phylum: Chordata
- Class: Chondrichthyes
- Family: †Tristychiidae
- Genus: †Tristychius; Agassiz, 1837

Type species
- †Tristychius arcuatus Agassiz, 1837

= Tristychius =

Tristychius Temporal range: Early Carboniferous, Visean

Extinct genus of cartilaginous fishes

Tristychius (from Greek: τρεις treis, 'three' and Greek: στῐ́χος stíkhos 'row') is an extinct genus of euselachian chondrichthyan from the Carboniferous period (Visean). Fossils of T. arcuatus, the type and only species, including fin spines have been found in Scotland.

Tristychius was a small animal, up to about 60 centimetres (2 ft) long. It had a heterocercal caudal fin, and large spines on two dorsal fins. Unlike other chondrichthyans that have three basal plates on pectoral fin (propterygium, mesopterygium and metapterygium), its pectoral fin had only two basal plates and lacked mesopterygium. Even through it is one of the earliest known stem-elasmobranchs, it is estimated to be a specialized suction feeding benthic predator, either ambushing or using stealth to approach its prey. While historically considered a hybodont, a 2016 study considered it to be a basal euselachian, with hybodonts more closely related to Neoselachii (the group of modern sharks and rays) than to Tristychius. The study placed the genus in the family Tristychiidae along with Acronemus.

- Holocephali (chimaeras and relatives)
- Euselachii
  - Tristychiidae
    - Acronemus
    - Tristychius
  - - Hybodontiformes (hybodonts)
    - Neoselachii (modern sharks and rays)
