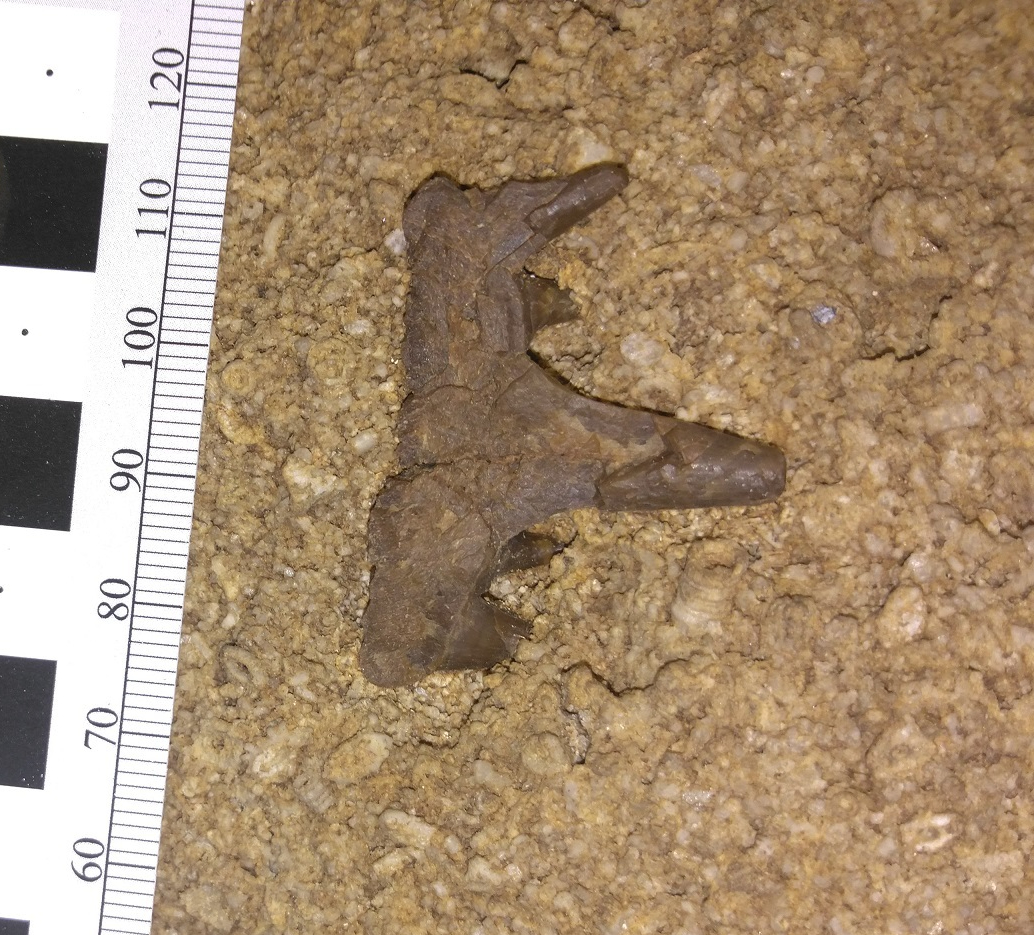
- A tooth which has been assigned to Cladodus sp. from Mammoth Cave. Cladodus exhibits cladodont dentition

Scientific classification
- Kingdom: Animalia
- Phylum: Chordata
- Class: Chondrichthyes
- Subclass: Elasmobranchii
- Order: †Ctenacanthiformes
- Family: †Ctenacanthidae
- Genus: †Cladodus; Agassiz, 1843

Species
- See text

= Cladodus =

Cladodus Temporal range: Carboniferous

Extinct genus of cartilaginous fishes

Cladodus is an extinct genus of cartilaginous fishes in the family Ctenacanthidae. As the name implies, they are a type of cladodont, primitive sharks with teeth designed to snag fish and swallow them whole, instead of sawing off chunks to swallow.

Fossils of Cladodus have been found in Barkip, Scotland, Bundock and Laurel Formations, Australia and in the Pitkin Formation (Carboniferous period) in Arkansas, United States. In addition, fossils attributable to Cladodus are known from the Manning Canyon Shale of Carboniferous age in the state of Utah.

== Species ==
- †Cladodus alternatus St. John & Worthen, 1875
- †Cladodus angulatus Newberry & Worthen, 1866
- †Cladodus bellifer St. John & Worthen, 1875
- †Cladodus divaricatus Trautschold, 1874
- †Cladodus elegans Newberry & Worthen, 1870 Remains (braincase and a tooth) have been found in Scotland (Clackmannan Group).
- †Cladodus eriensis Bryant, 1935
- †Cladodus formosus Hay, 1902
- †Cladodus gailensis Feichtinger et al., 2021
- †Cladodus marginatus Agassiz, 1843
- †Cladodus mirabilis Agassiz, 1843 (type species)
- †Cladodus pandatus St. John & Worthen, 1875
- †Cladodus springeri St. John & Worthen, 1875
- †Cladodus thomasi Turner, 1982 Known by teeth from the Lower Carboniferous Bundock Formation, North Queensland, and the Tournaisian Laurel Formation, Western Australia. Teeth reach 2.2-90 mm in length. This species was considered as a junior synonym of Stethacanthus obtusus by Lebedev (1996) but later reassigned to Cladodus due to a smaller number and distinct morphology of cusps.
- †Cladodus vanhornei St. John & Worthen, 1875
- †Cladodus yunnanensis Pan, 1964

== See also ==
- List of prehistoric cartilaginous fish genera
