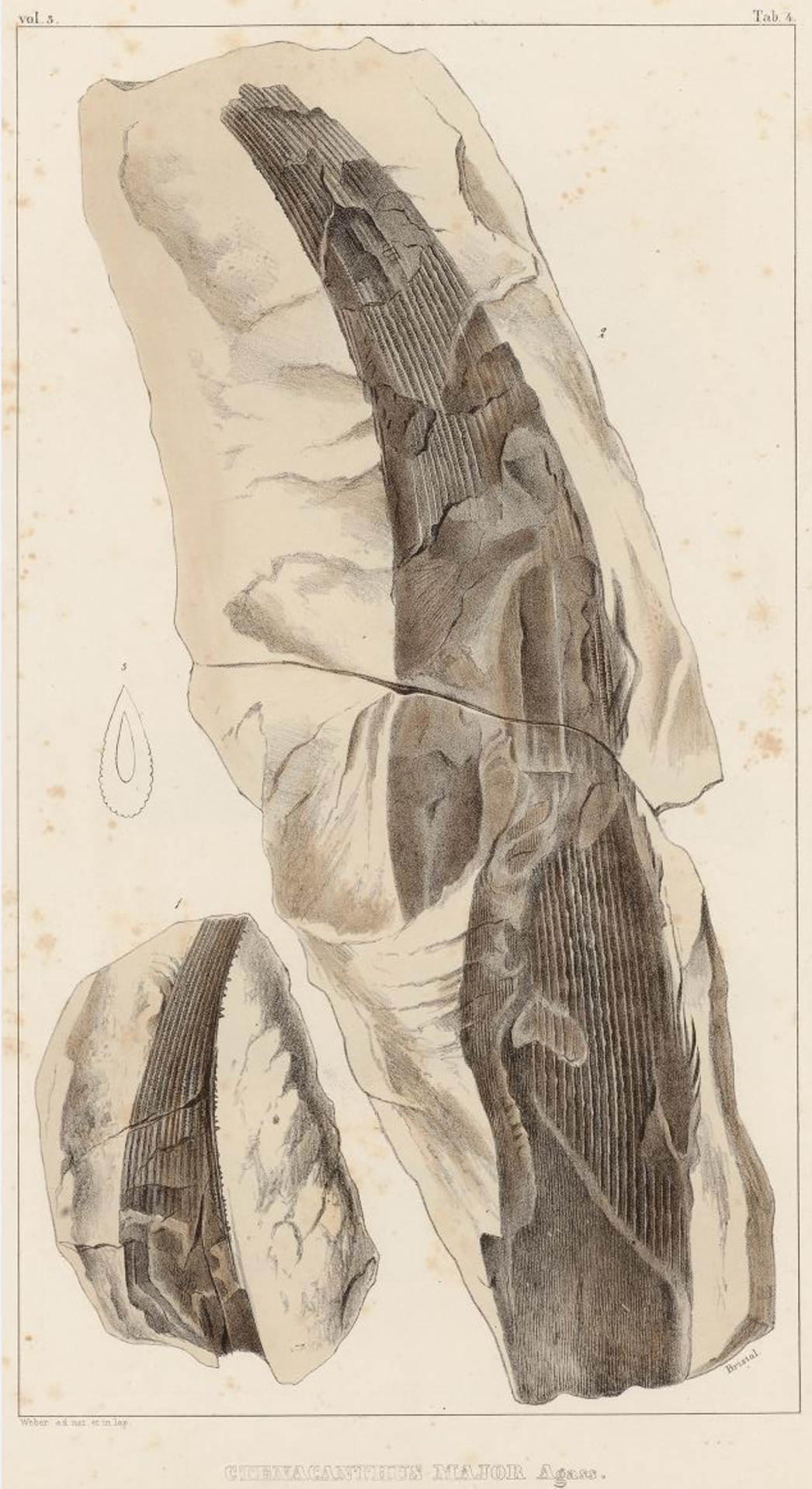
- Dorsal spine of the type species, C. major, as illustrated by Louis Agassiz
- Restoration of C. concinnus

Scientific classification
- Kingdom: Animalia
- Phylum: Chordata
- Class: Chondrichthyes
- Subclass: Elasmobranchii
- Order: †Ctenacanthiformes
- Family: †Ctenacanthidae
- Genus: †Ctenacanthus; Agassiz, 1837

Type species
- Ctenacanthus major Agassiz, 1837

Species
- See text

= Ctenacanthus =

Ctenacanthus Temporal range: 363–323 Ma

Extinct genus of cartilaginous fishes

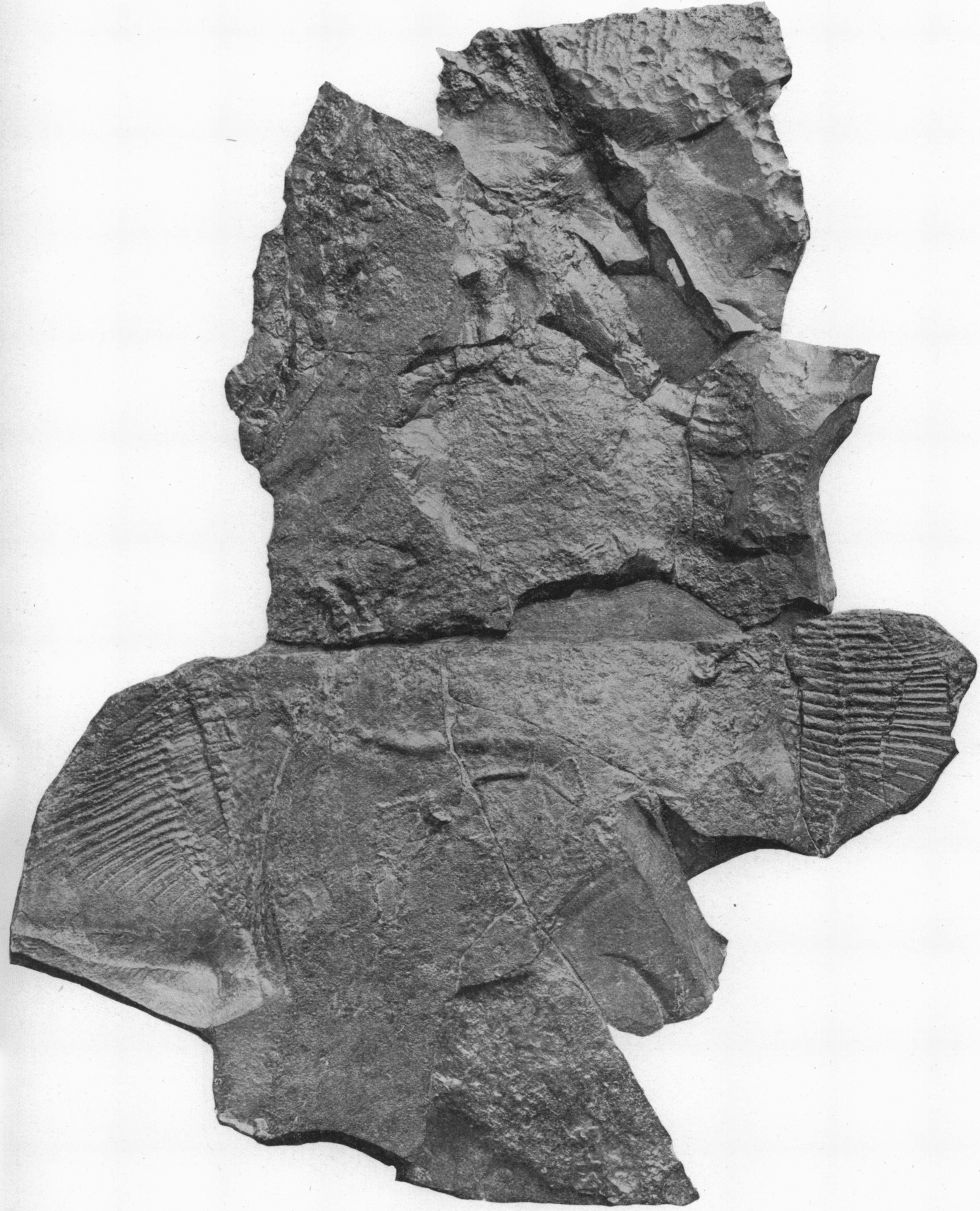
Front portion of the body of Ctenacanthus concinnus (originally described as "C. clarkii") from the Devonian-age Cleveland Shale

Ctenacanthus (from Greek: κτείς kteis, 'comb' and Greek: ἄκανθα akantha, 'spine') is an extinct genus of ctenacanthiform chondrichthyan. Remains have been found in the Bloyd Formation (Carboniferous Period) of Arkansas and the Cleveland Shale (Devonian Period) of Ohio in the United States and in South America.

== Valid species ==
- Ctenacanthus buttersi St. John & Worthen, 1883
- Ctenacanthus chemungensis Claypole, 1885
- Ctenacanthus concinnus Newberry, 1875
- Ctenacanthus denticulatus McCoy, 1848
- Ctenacanthus formosus Newberry, 1873
- Ctenacanthus harrissi Caster, 1930
- Ctenacanthus lamborni Wells, 1944
- Ctenacanthus major Agassiz, 1843
- Ctenacanthus pellensis St. John & Worthen, 1883
- Ctenacanthus sculptus St. John & Worthen, 1875
- Ctenacanthus terrelli Newberry, 1889
- Ctenacanthus tumidus Newberry, 1889
- Ctenacanthus vetustus Eastman, 1902
- Ctenacanthus wrightii Newberry, 1884
- Ctenacanthus amblyxiphias Cope, 1891
- Ctenacanthus ishii Kapoor & Sahni, 1971

== Palaeoecology ==
Dental microwear texture analysis (DMTA) of C. concinnus teeth shows that the species was an opportunistic feeder that would have eaten a variety of animals, including other chondrichthyans and ectocochleate cephalopods.

== See also ==
- List of prehistoric cartilaginous fish genera
