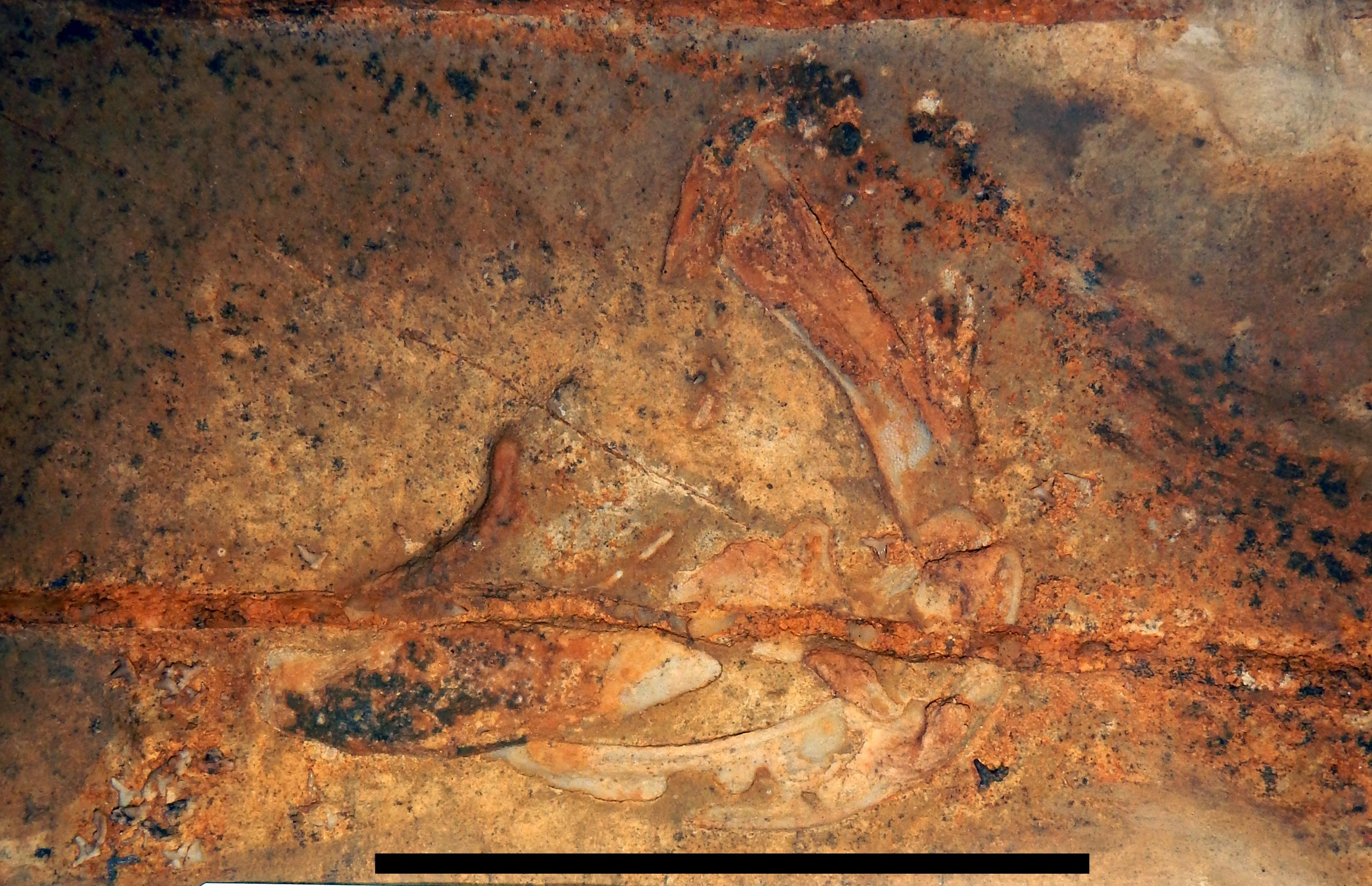
- Preserved skull, jaws, and gill arches of G. careforum

Scientific classification
- Kingdom: Animalia
- Phylum: Chordata
- Class: Chondrichthyes
- Subclass: Elasmobranchii
- Order: †Ctenacanthiformes
- Family: †Ctenacanthidae
- Genus: †Glikmanius; Ginter, Ivanov & Lebedev, 2005

Type species
- Glikmanius occidentalis (Leidy, 1859)

Species
- †G. culmenis Koot et al., 2013; †G. myachovensis Lebedev, 2001; †G. careforum Hodnett et al. 2024

= Glikmanius =

Glikmanius Temporal range: Late Pennsylvanian–early Permian

Extinct genus of cartilaginous fishes

Glikmanius is an extinct genus of ctenacanth cartilaginous fish which lived in the Carboniferous and Permian of North America and Russia. Skeletal remains attributed to the genus are known from Nebraska, USA. Glikmanius is named in honour of the Russian palaeontologist, Dr. Leonid Glikman, who studied the genus and was "the first to propose its ctenacanthiform affinity". G. careforum may have reached lengths of 3 metres (9.8 ft), while G. occidentalis may have reached lengths of over 6 metres (20 ft), making it one the largest marine predators of its time.

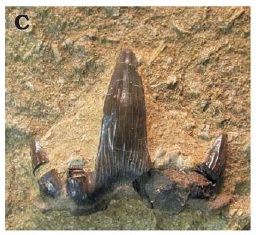
Tooth of Glikmanius occidentalis.
