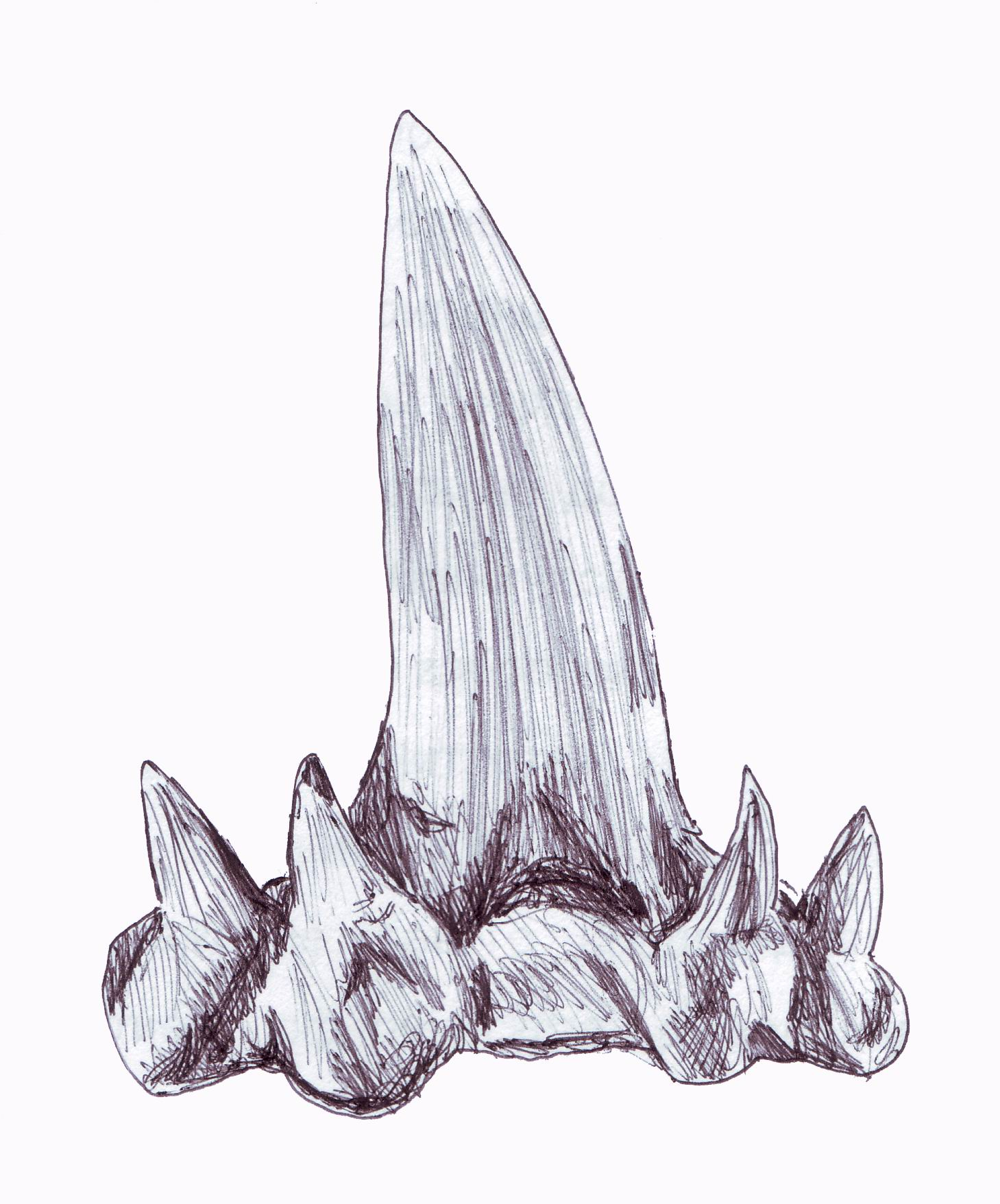
- A typical cladodont tooth, of a shark called Glikmanius

Scientific classification
- Kingdom: Animalia
- Phylum: Chordata
- Class: Chondrichthyes
- Subclass: Elasmobranchii
- Superorder: †Cladodontomorphi; Ginter et al. 2010

= Cladodont =

Early Devonian shark tooth structure

Cladodont (from Latin cladus, meaning branch and Greek odon, meaning tooth) is the term for a common category of early Devonian shark known primarily for its "multi-cusped" tooth consisting of one long blade surrounded by many short, fork-like tines, designed to catch food that was swallowed whole, instead of being used to saw off chunks of meat like many modern sharks. The group may be treated as the superorder Cladodontomorphi. The skinny teeth would puncture and grasp the prey, keeping it from wriggling free.

Because the most common fossil evidence of cartilaginous fish is teeth, this term is also used for the fossilised teeth themselves.

== History ==
The fossil tooth of Cladodus belifer, which lived about 260,000,000 years ago in what would someday be Illinois. The roundness of the main tooth, and the small tines around it, show it to be a cladodont.

The earliest known shark, Cladoselache, was a cladodont existing about 370 million years ago. It had the typical cladodont teeth, which probably also were not regularly replaced like those of modern sharks, but did appear to wear down from use. This shark did indeed appear to swallow its prey whole, fossil examples containing batches of fish arranged tail-first where the shark's stomach should be.

Around this time, Stethacanthus also begins to appear in the fossil record. Also a cladodont, it survived from the late Devonian to the early Carboniferous, dying out about 320 million years ago.

While the earliest known sharks are cladodont, there is some evidence that they evolved from a common ancestor with "diplodonts", sharks whose teeth have two larger blades poking out, plus a small middle tine that could have become the main blade in cladodont teeth.

Some cladodonts appear to have been in existence as recently as the Cretaceous period, based on cladodont teeth found in deep water deposits of Early Cretaceous (Valanginian) age in Austria and France.

At one point, frilled sharks were thought to be living descendants of cladodonts, but they are now believed to simply be unrelated, curiously shaped sharks, despite similarly pointy, snagging teeth.
