= Cleveland Shale =

Geologic member in the United States

- Stratigraphic range: Famennian; ~362.6–360.1 Ma
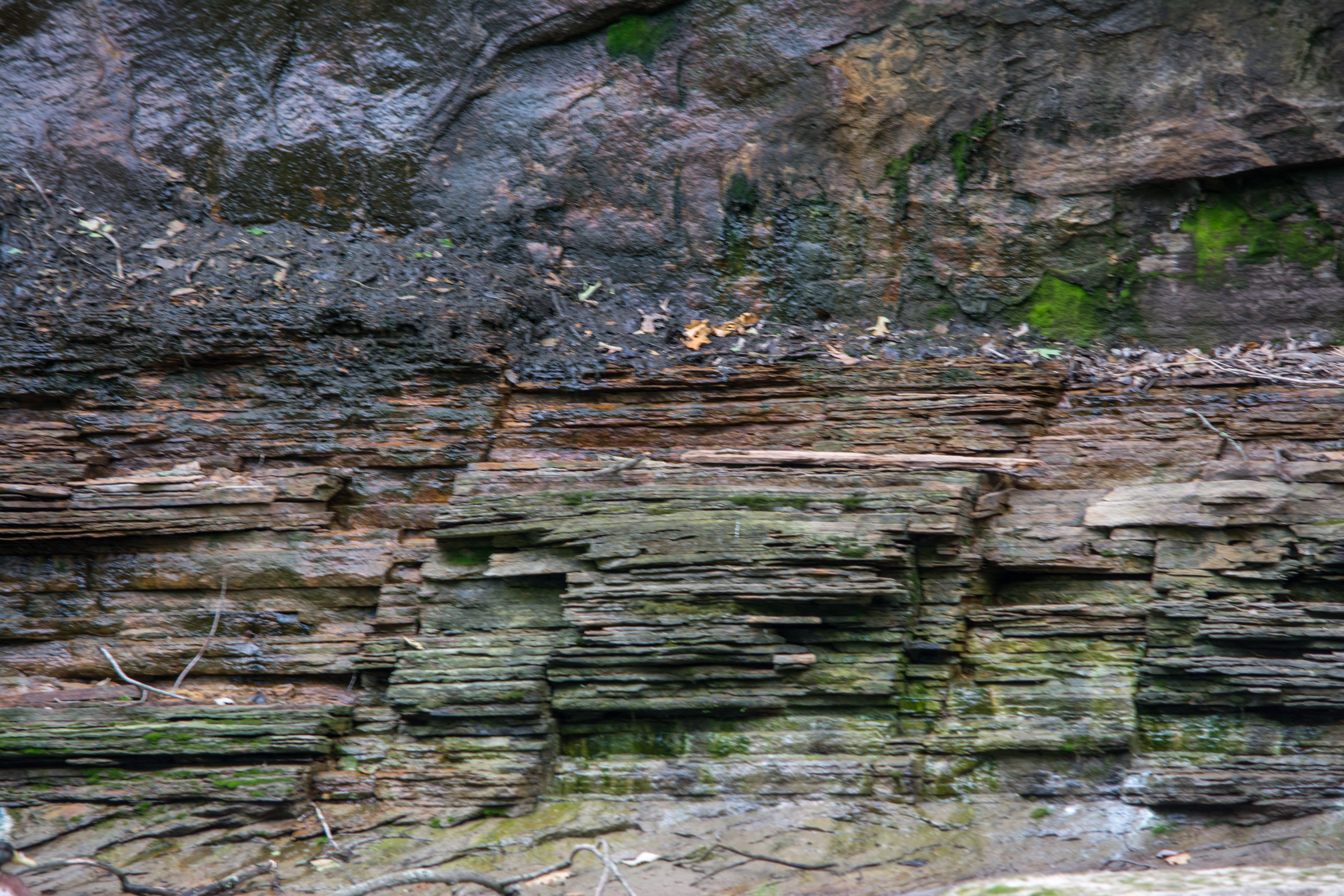
- Cleveland Shale (below) and Berea Sandstone of the Bedford Formation at the Great Falls of Tinkers Creek near Bedford, Ohio
- Type: Member
- Unit of: Ohio Shale
- Underlies: Bedford Shale
- Overlies: Chagrin Shale

Lithology
- Primary: Shale
- Other: Pyrite

Location
- Coordinates: 39.4°N 83.6°W
- Approximate paleocoordinates: 31.3°S 32.2°W
- Region: Ohio
- Country: United States

Type section
- Named for: Cleveland, Ohio
- Named by: John Strong Newberry
- Year defined: 1870
- Cleveland Shale (the United States) Cleveland Shale (Ohio)

The Cleveland Shale, also referred to as the Cleveland Member of the Ohio Shale, is a Late Devonian (Famennian) shale geologic member in the eastern United States.

== Identification and name ==
The Cleveland Shale was identified in 1870 and named for the city of Cleveland, Ohio. John Strong Newberry, director of the Ohio State Geological Survey, first identified the member in 1870. He called it the "Cleveland Shale" and designated its type locality at Doan Brook near Cleveland. Details of the type locality and of stratigraphic nomenclature for this unit as used by the U.S. Geological Survey are available on-line at the National Geologic Map Database.

== Description ==
The primary minerals in the Cleveland Shale are chlorite, illite, pyrite, and quartz. (Note: Quartz particles in the shale range from 2 to 7 micrometres (7.9×10^{−5} to 0.000276 in) in size.) Underground, the Cleveland Shale is black, dull grayish-black, bluish-black, or brownish-black in color. In exposed outcrops, it weathers to red, reddish-brown, or medium brown. Highly weathered rock turns gray. It is fairly fissile, breaking into thin, irregularly shaped sheets or flakes that occasionally display crystals of pickeringite. Relieved of stress once exposed, the Cleveland Shale is nonplastic and can appear as if fragmented into blocks due to jointing.

=== Pyrite basal boundary ===
There is a sharp and clear distinction between the Cleveland Shale and underlying Chagrin Shale. At the very bottom of the Cleveland Shale there is a thin, discontinuous layer of pyrite. (Note: Pyrite forms when organic material falls onto an ocean floor that is anaerobic, has little bottom current, and has extensive deposition of silt and sediment.) This pyrite layer is discontinuous because after this rock was laid down, it was eroded. The erosion increases as one moves south along the valley of the Cuyahoga River and east to the Grand River. Portions of the pyrite layer, known as Skinner's Run Bed, contain fragments of petrified wood and fossilized fish bones worn smooth by the action of water. Above the pyrite layer, a limestone layer is found in west-central (but not eastern) Ohio.

The remainder of the Cleveland Shale generally consists of a relatively hard, (Note: "Hard" is defined as having a compressive strength between 10,000 to 13,000 pounds per square inch (69,000 to 90,000 kPa).) organic rich oil shale. It has both an upper and lower part.

=== Lower part ===
A clay shale, described as bluish or bluish-gray and as olive-black to brownish-black, forms the lower part. The lower part can be anywhere from a few inches to several feet in thickness. This layer is sometimes referred to as the Olmstead shale. This layer has been dated to between 362.6 and 361.0 million years old based on conodont biozones (Bispathodus aculeatus aculeatus to Bispathodus ultimus ultimus zones). Thin beds of gray or brown siltstone, lumps of pyrite, and layers of silica-heavy limestone with cone-in-cone structures are found in the lower part. In eastern Ohio, thin gray veins ("stringers") of siltstone appear. In western Ohio, the Cleveland Shale appears to interbed with the Chagrin Shale below it, erasing the clear boundary between the two rock units.

=== Upper part ===
The upper part of the Cleveland Shale is a black to brownish black silty shale with occasional thin beds of gray shale and siltstone. The upper part is much richer in petroleum and kerogen. (Note: In a 1981 study of Cleveland Shale samples in central-eastern Kentucky, the upper part of the shale was 11 percent carbon and 1.3 percent hydrogen.) When broken open, fresh samples smell like crude oil. Where the upper part is thick, and particularly in northeast Ohio, the shale has a distinctive "rippled" appearance. The upper 10 feet (3.0 m) of the Cleveland Shale contains abundant nodules of phosphate, nodules and bands (extremely thin beds) of pyrite, bands of calcisiltite, and lamination. Almost no concretions are found in the upper part.

== Geographic extent ==
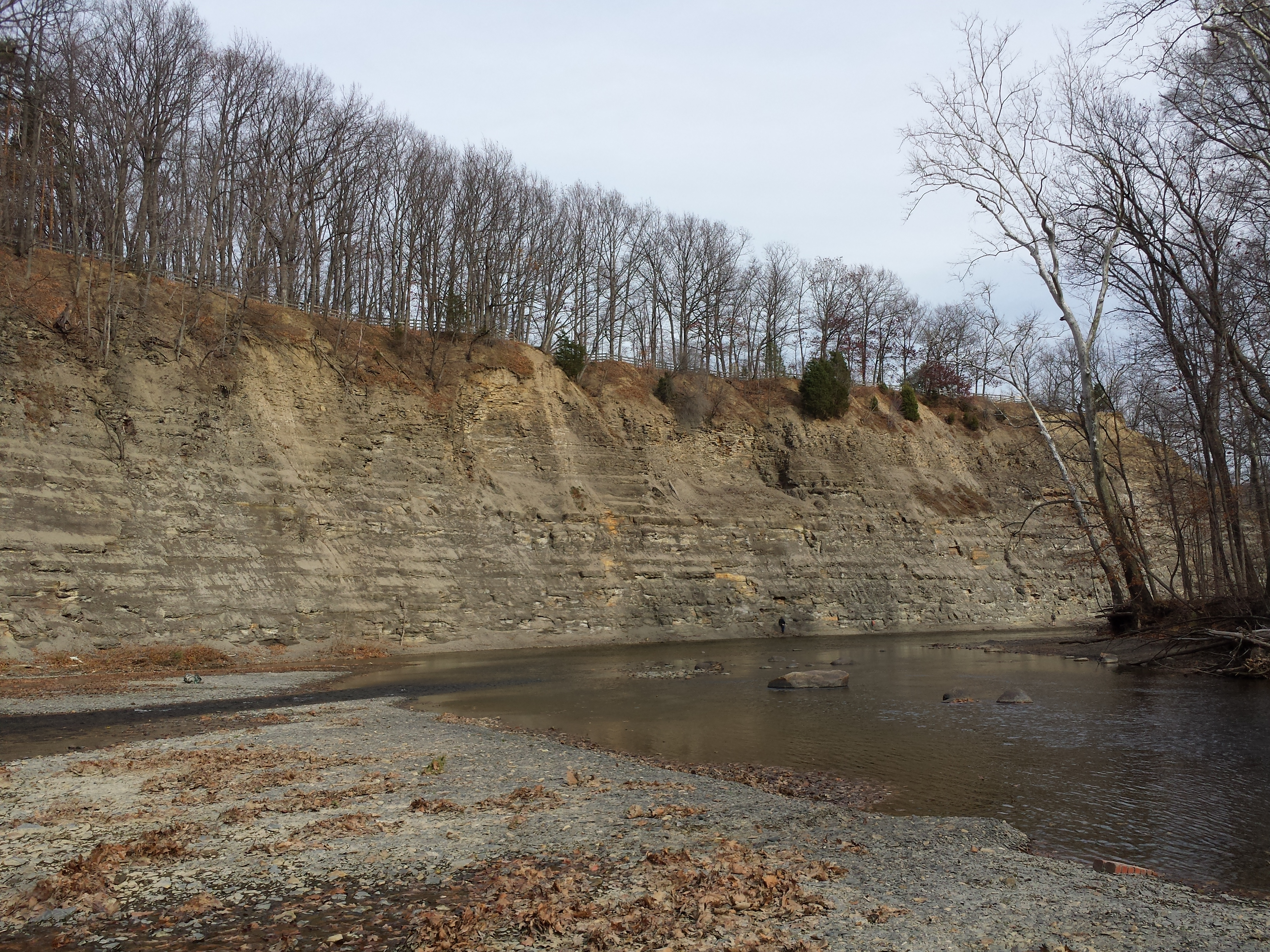
A thick sequence of the Cleveland Shale exposed on the north bank of the Rocky River in North Olmsted, Ohio. For scale, note the paleontologists just right of center at the base of the cliff.

The Cleveland Shale is a shale geologic member in Ohio in the United States. It underlies much of northeast Ohio in beds of varying thickness.

In northeast Ohio, the member does not appear east of the Grand River.

Measurements taken in northeast Ohio show the Cleveland Shale to be 7 feet (2.1 m) to 100 feet (30 m) thick. It is thickest around the Rocky River north of Berea, Ohio, and thins to the east, west, and south.

The Cleveland Shale is found in east-central Kentucky. In east-central Kentucky, the Cleveland Shale is more uniform in thickness, ranging from 41.4 to 50.1 feet (12.6 to 15.3 m), and increases in thickness toward the east.

The unit is also present in West Virginia and in southwest Virginia, where it is mapped as the Cleveland Member of the Ohio Shale.

== Stratigraphic setting ==
The Cleveland Shale (or Cleveland Member) is a sub-unit of the Ohio Shale Formation. The Chagrin Shale underlies the Cleveland Shale. The Bedford Shale generally overlies the Cleveland Shale, with a sharp distinction between the two. In west-central Ohio, more than 150 feet (46 m) of Bedford Shale may lie above the Cleveland Shale. In places, red and grey shale may intertongue (interlock) with the Cleveland Shale extensively. In far eastern Ohio, the Bedford Shale thins by more than 125 feet (38 m). Where the Cussewago Shale is also present, the Bedford Shale is usually less than 25 feet (7.6 m) and may be locally absent. In some areas, the Cleveland Shale is described as overstepped or unconformably overlaid gradationally by Berea Siltstone and sharply by Berea Sandstone.

It is the regional equivalent of the Hangenberg Black Shale and the Bakken Shale.

== Paleobiota ==
Exceptional marine animal fossils are found in the member. The Cleveland Shale is generally considered to be fossil-poor, but there are exceptions. The basal pyrite layer contains petrified wood and fossilized fish bones. The lower part is famous for its extensive and well-preserved fossil Chondrichthyans (including Cladoselache), Conodonts, Placodermi, and palaeoniscinoids ray-finned fishes. The giant predatory placoderms Dunkleosteus terrelli, Gorgonichthys clarki, Gymnotrachelus hydei, Heintzichthys gouldii, and five species (including the type specimen) of Titanichthys were all discovered in the Cleveland Shale. The Cleveland Shale is classified as a konservatte-lagerstatten, which means it often preserves complete body fossils. Typical early shark preservation includes soft tissue outlines and impressions, fin rays, gill musculature, cartilage, and stomach contents. Placoderms in the Cleveland Shale typically do not show any good soft-tissue preservation.

Faunal list follows Carr and Jackson (2008) and Carr (2018).

=== Placodermi ===
All placoderms in the Cleveland Shale are arthrodires.

Genus	Species	Notes	Images
Bungartius	B. perissus	A medium-sized mylostomatid with a relatively low and narrow skull and a presumably durophagous diet.	
Callognathus	C. regularis	A rare possible selenosteid based on small jaw plates.	
"Coccosteus"	"C." cuyahogae	A rare coccosteomorph of uncertain affinities, based on a single jaw plate. Not necessarily a close relative of more complete and better-described species of Coccosteus.	
Diplognathus	D. mirabilis	A somewhat large aspinothoracid with narrow serrated jaws.	
Dunkleosteus	D. terrelli	A very large dunkleosteid with a massive bite force and an apex predator niche. The most famous placoderm in general, as well as one of the largest and most common fish in the Cleveland Shale. Previously considered a species of Dinichthys.	
Glyptaspis	G. verrucosa	A rare arthrodire of uncertain affinities, known from a few roughly-textured belly plates.	
Gorgonichthys	G. clarki	A very large aspinothoracid, similar in size and ecology to Dunkleosteus. Previously considered a species of Dinichthys.	
Gymnotrachelus	G. hydei	A selenosteid with a low, broad skull and small tooth-like denticles along the jaw.	
Heintzichthys	H. gouldii	An aspinothoracid with a boxy skull. Previously considered a species of Dinichthys.	
Hlavinichthys	H. jacksoni	An aspinothoracid.	
Holdenius	H. holdeni	An aspinothoracid similar to Heintzichthys, though with a deeper jaw.	
Hussakofia	H. minor	A small dunkleosteid with a very short, deep jaw.	
Mylostoma	M. eurhinus	A mylostomatid with a very broad skull.	
Mylostoma	M. newberryi	A mylostomatid with a very broad skull.	
Mylostoma	M. variabile	A mylostomatid with a very broad skull.	
Paramylostoma	P. arcualis	A small selenosteid with a narrow skull.	
Selenosteus	S. brevis	A small selenosteid with a broad skull.	
Stenosteus	S. angustopectus	A small selenosteid similar to Selenosteus, with a broad skull.	
Stenosteus	S. glaber	A small selenosteid similar to Selenosteus, with a broad skull.	
Titanichthys	T. agassizi	A very large filter-feeding mylostomatid based on multiple species, some of which may be synonyms. The second most common placoderm in the Cleveland Shale after Dunkleosteus terrelli. Titanichthys hussakofi was formerly known as Brontichthys clarki.	
Titanichthys	T. attenuatus	A very large filter-feeding mylostomatid based on multiple species, some of which may be synonyms. The second most common placoderm in the Cleveland Shale after Dunkleosteus terrelli. Titanichthys hussakofi was formerly known as Brontichthys clarki.	
Titanichthys	T. clarkii	A very large filter-feeding mylostomatid based on multiple species, some of which may be synonyms. The second most common placoderm in the Cleveland Shale after Dunkleosteus terrelli. Titanichthys hussakofi was formerly known as Brontichthys clarki.	
Titanichthys	T. hussakofi	A very large filter-feeding mylostomatid based on multiple species, some of which may be synonyms. The second most common placoderm in the Cleveland Shale after Dunkleosteus terrelli. Titanichthys hussakofi was formerly known as Brontichthys clarki.	
Titanichthys	T. rectus	A very large filter-feeding mylostomatid based on multiple species, some of which may be synonyms. The second most common placoderm in the Cleveland Shale after Dunkleosteus terrelli. Titanichthys hussakofi was formerly known as Brontichthys clarki.	
Trachosteus	T. clarki	A rare possible selenosteid known from a few armor fragments.	

=== Chondrichthyes ===
Other undescribed chondrichthyans (cartilaginous fish) from the Cleveland Shale include a cladoselachian, a cochliodont, a eugeneodont, a hybodont, stethacanthids (including a new species of Stethacanthus), Sphenacanthus, and several additional forms represented by unique head and fin spines. A conference abstract by Hlavin (1972) briefly mentioned associated assemblages of teeth (Orodus sp.) and fin spines (Ctenacanthus vetustus); Zangerl (1981) suggested that each assemblage represented an early hybodont with Orodus-like teeth and ctenacanth-like spines.

Genus	Species	Notes	Images
Cladoselache	C. acanthopterygius	A common shark-like predator with large eyes, cladodont teeth, a broad mouth at the front of the head, a robust dorsal fin spine, a streamlined body, and a tall caudal fin with wide keels on the tail stalk. Ecologically similar to mako sharks, though not closely related to any modern shark. Potentially a symmoriiform (close to Stethacanthus) and/or an early holocephalan (distantly related to modern chimaeras). Many Cladoselache species have been named based primarily on subtle variation in fin structure, though some will likely turn out to be invalid or synonymous upon reinvestigation. The two most frequently mentioned species are C. fyleri (the type species, which is rather small) and C. kepleri (a larger species).	
Cladoselache	C. brachypterygius		
Cladoselache	C. clarki		
Cladoselache	C. desmopterygius		
Cladoselache	C. eastmani		
Cladoselache	C. fyleri		
Cladoselache	C. kepleri		
Cladoselache	C. magnificus		
Cladoselache	C. newberryi		
Cladoselache	C. pachypterygius		
Ctenacanthus	C. concinnus	A ctenacanthiform shark with many named species, some of which appear to be synonymous with others. Some ctenacanth species named from the Cleveland Shale are based on fin spines (C. compressus, C. clarki, C. vetustus), while others (C. concinnus, C. terrelli, C. tumidus) are based on cladodont teeth. Specimens preserving both teeth and fin spines demonstrate that C. concinnus, C. compressus, and C. clarki are probably all the same species, with C. concinnus taking priority. As a result, C. concinnus is regarded as the Cleveland Shale ctenacanth with the best-preserved specimens (formerly referred to the spine-based species). C. tumidus may be the largest shark in the member based on the size of its teeth.	
Ctenacanthus	C. terrelli		
Ctenacanthus	C. tumidus		
Ctenacanthus	C. vetustus?		
Diademodus	D. hydei	A possible phoebodontid with small fins, and tiny many-cusped teeth. Known from a single body fossil.	
Monocladodus	M. clarki	A cladoselachid very similar to Cladoselache. Primarily distinguished by some of its cladodont teeth being single-cusped, though multi-cusped teeth are also present in the jaw. There is disagreement over whether it should be treated as a valid distinct genus or not.	
Orodus	O. spp. (x3)	At least three undescribed species of orodontids known from broad crushing teeth. Complete Orodus specimens from Late Carboniferous Indiana have a long body and small fins.	
Phoebodus	P. politus	A phoebodontid known from small teeth with three main cusps. Complete Phoebodus specimens from Late Devonian Morocco are similar in proportion to modern frilled sharks.	
Stethacanthus	S. altonensis	A stethacanthid symmoriiform with cladodont teeth, extensive denticles on the head and an unusual "spine-brush complex".	
Tamiobatis	T. vetustus	A ctenacanthiform shark preserving both skull cartilage and cladodont teeth.	

=== Osteichthyes ===
Other undescribed osteichthyans (bony fish) from the Cleveland Shale include a new species of Kentuckia and an unnamed Mesopoma-like palaeoniscoid.

Genus	Species	Notes
Kentuckia	K. hlavini	A palaeonisciform actinopterygian (ray-finned fish).
Proceratodus	P. wagneri	A lungfish. The only sarcopterygian (lobe-finned fish) currently recorded from the Cleveland Member.
Tegeolepis	T. clarki	A palaeonisciform actinopterygian.

== Age ==
The Cleveland Shale is approximately 362.6 to 360.1 million years old, daing to the very latest part of the Devonian period, the Famennian, based on biostratigraphy from conodonts and plant spores. The Cleveland Shale extends all the way to the Hangenberg mass extinction that ended the Devonian but does not reach the very end of the Devonian period. Unlike the Permian-Triassic extinction and Cretaceous-Paleogene extinction the Devonian-Carboniferous boundary does not correlate with the mass extinction event at the end of this period. The Bedford Shale and Berea Sandstone represent Devonian layers that post-date the Devonian-Carboniferous extinction but were deposited on top of the Cleveland Shale, and encompass some of the recovery fauna otherwise typical of the Carboniferous in the aftermath of the Hangenberg Event.

The upper 2.5 m of the Cleveland Shale has been chemostratigraphically correlated with the Hangenberg Event and the type stratigraphy in Germany, suggesting that the Cleveland Shale preserves the second of the two mass extinction events that together comprise the late Devonian extinction

== Interpretation of depositional environments ==
The Cleveland Shale is likely the regional expression of the Dasberg Event, a major extinction event that occurred near the end of the Devonian period. The Cleveland Shale is interpreted as having accumulated in an anaerobic environment. Evidence exists to suggest that the Cleveland Shale was laid down during the Dasberg event, an Upper Famennian extinction event that devastated land-based flora and marine-based fauna. This led to a significant drop in marine oxygen (an anoxic event) and atmospheric carbon dioxide, and then a brief glaciation. The global environment recovered, only to suffer another extinction, the Hangenberg event, close to the Devonian-Carboniferous boundary. While the Cleveland Shale was being deposited, extensive organic matter from the land was swept into the sea then lying over Ohio. Although there is dispute over how deep this sea was, the Dasberg event meant that oceans could support few to no bottom-dwelling animals. This explains why the Cleveland Shale largely lacks fossils of benthic organisms and has a high carbon content that colors the shale very dark gray to black.

The contact between the Chagrin Shale and Cleveland Shale has been described as interbedding. This feature is interpreted as having been caused when two different depositional environments (in this case, the oxygenated sea which laid down the Chagrin Shale and the anaerobic sea rich in organic matter which laid down the Cleveland Shale) moved repeatedly back and forth over the same area. Geologist Horace R. Collins called the boundary area intercalated, but it is unclear what meaning he intended. (Note: Intercalation can be used as a synonym for interbedding. The term may also mean the introduction of a new layer between two preexisting layers.)

Different hypotheses have been suggested as the cause of the regional, irregular contact between the Cleveland Shale and Bedford Formation. Charles E.B. Conybeare has noted that the Cleveland Shale is siltier in the east and more calcareous in the west. He hypothesized that this indicates that silt flowed into the sea from east to west. Current eroded the Cleveland Shale and then laid down new sediment in the gullies which became the Bedford Formation. Jack C. Pashin and Frank R. Ettensohn proposed a variation on this hypothesis. They note that the region containing the Cleveland Shale was undergoing uplift when the Bedford Formation was being deposited. This likely led to exposure and erosion of the Cleveland Shale, with sediment which became the Bedford Formation filling in these gullies. They also observe that there is evidence of diapirism (the intrusion of deformable Cleveland Shale upward into the more brittle Bedford Formation), as well as intertonguing. Baird et al. note that the Cleveland Shale also tilts downward to the south. They suggest that this caused overstepping, rather than intertonguing.

== Economic geology ==
The high organic content of the Cleveland Shale makes it eminently suitable for the formation of fossil fuels. One 1981 study found that the Cleveland Shale can yield an average of 14 US gallons (53 L; 12 imp gal) of petroleum per 1 short ton (0.91 t) of rock. The Cleveland Shale also contains cannel coal and "true" coal, although neither in great quantity.

== See also ==
- List of fossiliferous stratigraphic units in Ohio
- Marcellus Formation
- Escuminac Formation
- Floresta Formation
- Hunsrück Slate
- Rhynie Chert
- Gogo Formation
- Late Devonian extinction event

== Bibliography ==
- Baird, Gordon C.; Gryta, Jeffry J.; McKenzie, Scott C.; Over, D. Jeffrey; Pulawski, Shirley; Sullivan, Joseph S. (October 2009). "Deconvoluting the End-Devonian Story in the "Oil Lands" of Northwest Pennsylvania". History and Geology of the Oil Regions of Northwestern Pennsylvania. Guidebook for the 74th Annual Field Conference of Pennsylvania Geologists (PDF). Middletown, Pa.: Field Conference of Pennsylvania Geologists, Inc. Archived from the original (PDF) on September 20, 2015.
- Bates, Robert L.; Jackson, Julia A. (1984). Dictionary of Geological Terms. New York: Anchor Press. ISBN 978-0-385-18101-3.
- Bland, Alan E.; Robl, Thomas L.; Koppenaal, D.W. (1981). "Geochemistry of the New Albany, Ohio, and Sunbury Shales in East Central Kentucky". Proceedings, 1981 Eastern Oil Shale Symposium (Report). Lexington, Ky.: Institute for Mining and Minerals Research, University of Kentucky.
- Collins, Horace R. (1979). "Ohio". The Mississippian and Pennsylvanian (Carboniferous) Systems in the United States. Geological Survey Professional Paper 1110-E. Washington, D.C.: U.S. Government Printing Office.
- Conybeare, Charles Eric Bruce (1979). Lithostratigraphic Analysis of Sedimentary Basins. New York: Academic Press. ISBN 978-0-12-186050-9.
- Hannibal, Joseph T.; Feldman, Rodney M. (1987). "The Cuyahoga Valley National Recreation Area, Ohio: Devonian and Carboniferous Clastic Rocks". In Biggs, Donald L. (ed.). North-Central Section of the Geological Society of America. Centennial Field Guide. Volume 3. Boulder, Colo.: Geological Society of London. ISBN 978-0-8137-5403-1.
- Hansen, Michael C. (2005). "Phylum Chordata—Vertebrate Fossils". In Feldmann, Rodney M.; Hackathorn, Merrianne (eds.). Fossils of Ohio. ODNR Bulletin 70. Columbus, Ohio: Ohio Department of Natural Resources.
- Johnson, Gene O. (1981). "Overview of Oil Shale Development in Ohio". Proceedings, 1981 Eastern Oil Shale Symposium (Report). Lexington, Ky.: Institute for Mining and Minerals Research, University of Kentucky.
- Kaiser, Sandra Isabella; Aretz, Markus; Becker, Ralph Thomas (2016). "The Global Hangenberg Crisis (Devonian–Carboniferous Transition): Review of a First-Order Mass Extinction". In Becker, Ralph Thomas; Brett, Carlton E.; Königshof, Peter (eds.). Devonian Climate, Sea Level and Evolutionary Events. Geological Society Special Publication 423. London: Geological Society of London. ISBN 978-1-86239-734-7.
- Neuendorf, Klaus K.E.; Mehl, James P.; Jackson, Julia A. (2005). Glossary of Geology. Alexandria, Va.: American Geological Institute. ISBN 978-0-922152-76-6.
- Pashin, Jack C.; Ettensohn, Frank R. (1995). Reevaluation of the Bedford-Berea Sequence in Ohio and Adjacent States: Forced Regression in a Foreland Basin. Special Paper 298. Boulder, Colo.: Geological Society of America. ISBN 978-0-8137-2298-6.
- Pepper, James F.; DeWitt, Wallace Jr.; Demarest, David F. (1954). Geology of the Bedford Shale and Berea Sandstone in the Appalachian Basin. Geologic Survey Professional Paper 259. Washington, D.C.: U.S. Government Printing Office.
- Pollock, Don; Barron, Lance; Beard, John (1981). "Stratigraphy and Resource Assessment of the Oil Shales of East Central Kentucky". Proceedings, 1981 Eastern Oil Shale Symposium (Report). Lexington, Ky.: Institute for Mining and Minerals Research, University of Kentucky.
- Reasoner, J.W.; Sturgeon, L.; Naples, K.; Margolis, Marshall (1981). "Analytical Pyrolysis of Eastern Oil Shale". Proceedings, 1981 Eastern Oil Shale Symposium (Report). Lexington, Ky.: Institute for Mining and Minerals Research, University of Kentucky.
- Rubel, A.M.; Coburn, T.T. (1981). "Influence of Retorting Parameters on Oil Yield from Sunbury and Ohio Shales From Northeastern Kentucky". Proceedings, 1981 Eastern Oil Shale Symposium (Report). Lexington, Ky.: Institute for Mining and Minerals Research, University of Kentucky.
- Traverse, Alfred (2008). Paleopalynology. London: Springer. ISBN 978-1-4020-6684-9.
- Vyas, Kirit C.; Aho, Gary D.; Robl, Thomas L. (1981). "Synthetic Fuels from Eastern Oil Shale". Proceedings, 1981 Eastern Oil Shale Symposium (Report). Lexington, Ky.: Institute for Mining and Minerals Research, University of Kentucky.
- Williams, Arthur B. (1940). Geology of the Cleveland Region. Pocket Natural History No. 9. Geological Series No. 1. Cleveland: Cleveland Museum of Natural History.
- Wilmarth, M. Grace (1938). Lexicon of Geologic Names of the United States (Including Alaska). Part 1, A-L. Geologic Survey Bulletin 896. Washington, D.C.: U.S. Government Printing Office.
