= Overstep (disambiguation) =

An overstep is a structural discontinuity between two approximately parallel overlapping or underlapping geological faults.

Overstep may also refer to:

- Overstepping, a fault causing no-ball in cricket
- Overstep (album), a 2014 album by Mike Gordon
- Oversteps (album), a 2010 album by Autechre
- Overstepping (album), a 1998 album by Eve Beglarian
