= Marine transgression =

Geologic event in which sea level rises relative to the land

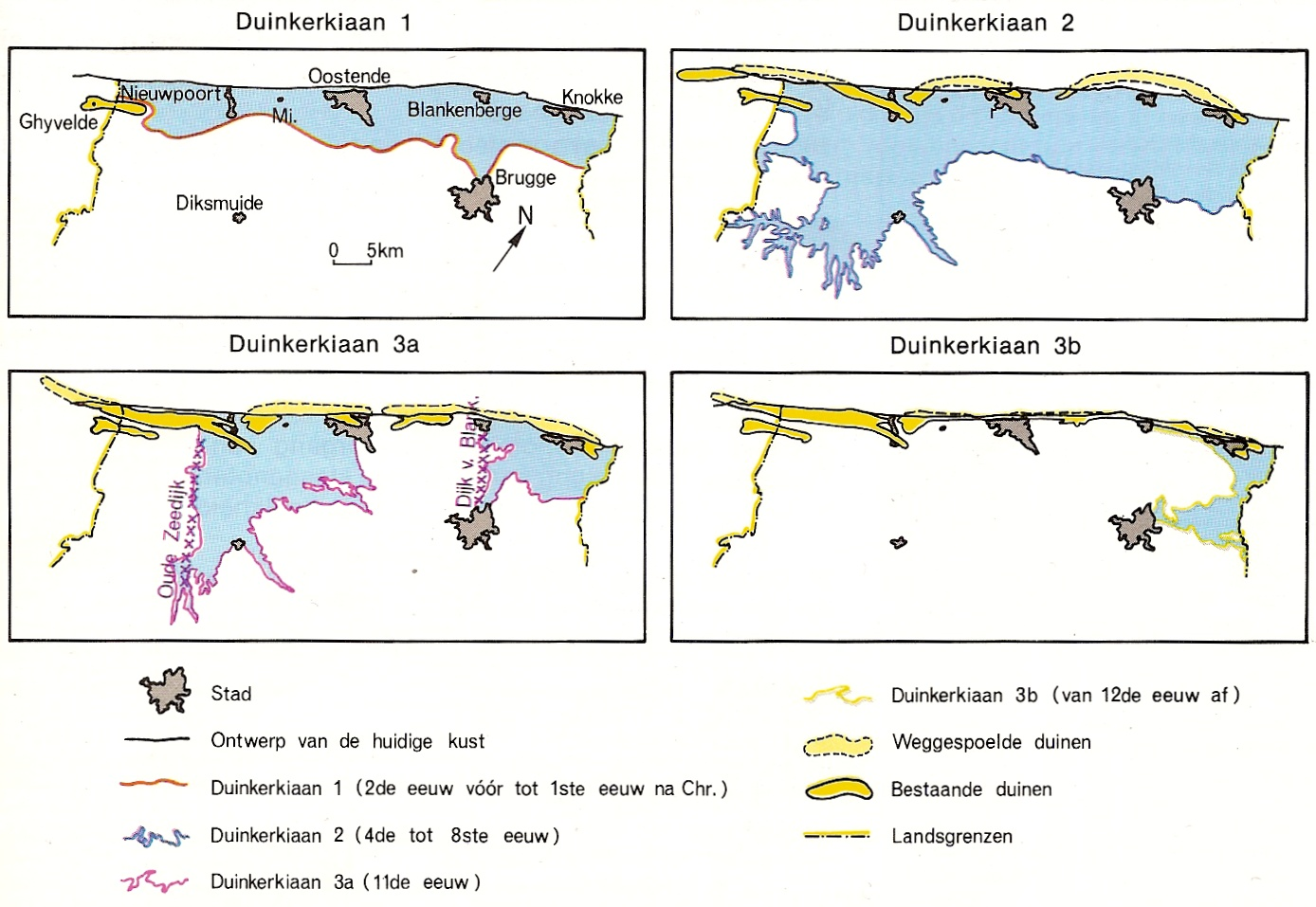
Maps of transgression and regression at the Belgian coast

A marine transgression is a geologic event where sea level rises relative to the land and the shoreline moves toward higher ground, resulting in flooding. Transgressions can be caused by the land sinking or by the ocean basins filling with water or decreasing in capacity. Transgressions and regressions may be caused by tectonic events like orogenies, severe climate change such as ice ages or isostatic adjustments following removal of ice or sediment load.

During the Cretaceous, seafloor spreading created a relatively shallow Atlantic basin at the expense of a deeper Pacific basin. That reduced the world's ocean basin capacity and caused a rise in sea level worldwide. As a result of the sea level rise, the oceans transgressed completely across the central portion of North America and created the Western Interior Seaway from the Gulf of Mexico to the Arctic Ocean.

The opposite of transgression is regression where the sea level falls relative to the land and exposes the former sea bottom. During the Pleistocene Ice Age, so much water was removed from the oceans and stored on land as year-round glaciers that the ocean regressed 120 m, exposing the Bering land bridge between Alaska and Asia.

== Characteristic facies ==
Cross-sectional diagrams illustrating the shift of sedimentary facies during transgression (onlap) and regression (offlap)

Sedimentary facies changes may indicate transgressions and regressions and are often easily identified because of the unique conditions required to deposit each type of sediment. For instance, coarse-grained clastics like sand are usually deposited in nearshore, high-energy environments. Fine-grained sediments however, such as silt and carbonate muds, are deposited further offshore, in deeper, lower energy waters.

Thus, a transgression reveals itself in the sedimentary column when there is a change from nearshore facies (such as sandstone) to offshore ones (such as marl), from the oldest to the youngest rocks. A regression will feature the opposite pattern, with offshore facies changing to nearshore ones. The strata represent regressions less clearly, as their upper layers are often marked by an erosional unconformity.

These are both idealized scenarios; In practice identifying transgressions or regressions can be more complicated. For instance, a regression may be indicated by a change from carbonates to shale only, or a transgression from sandstone to shale, and so on. Lateral changes in facies are also important; a well-marked transgression sequence in an area where an epeiric sea was deep may be only partially further away, where the water was shallow. These factors are important when interpreting a specific sedimentary column.

== See also ==
- Sea level rise – Rise in sea levels due to climate change
- Dunkirk transgression – Events of rising sea levels around the Low Countries in the late Roman period
- Ingression coast – Coast shaped by penetration of the sea
- Marine band (geology) – Bed of rock containing marine fossils
- Raised beach, also known as Marine terrace – Emergent coastal landform
- Sequence stratigraphy – Study and analysis of groups of sedimentary deposits
- Submerged forest – Remains of trees beneath a body of water
