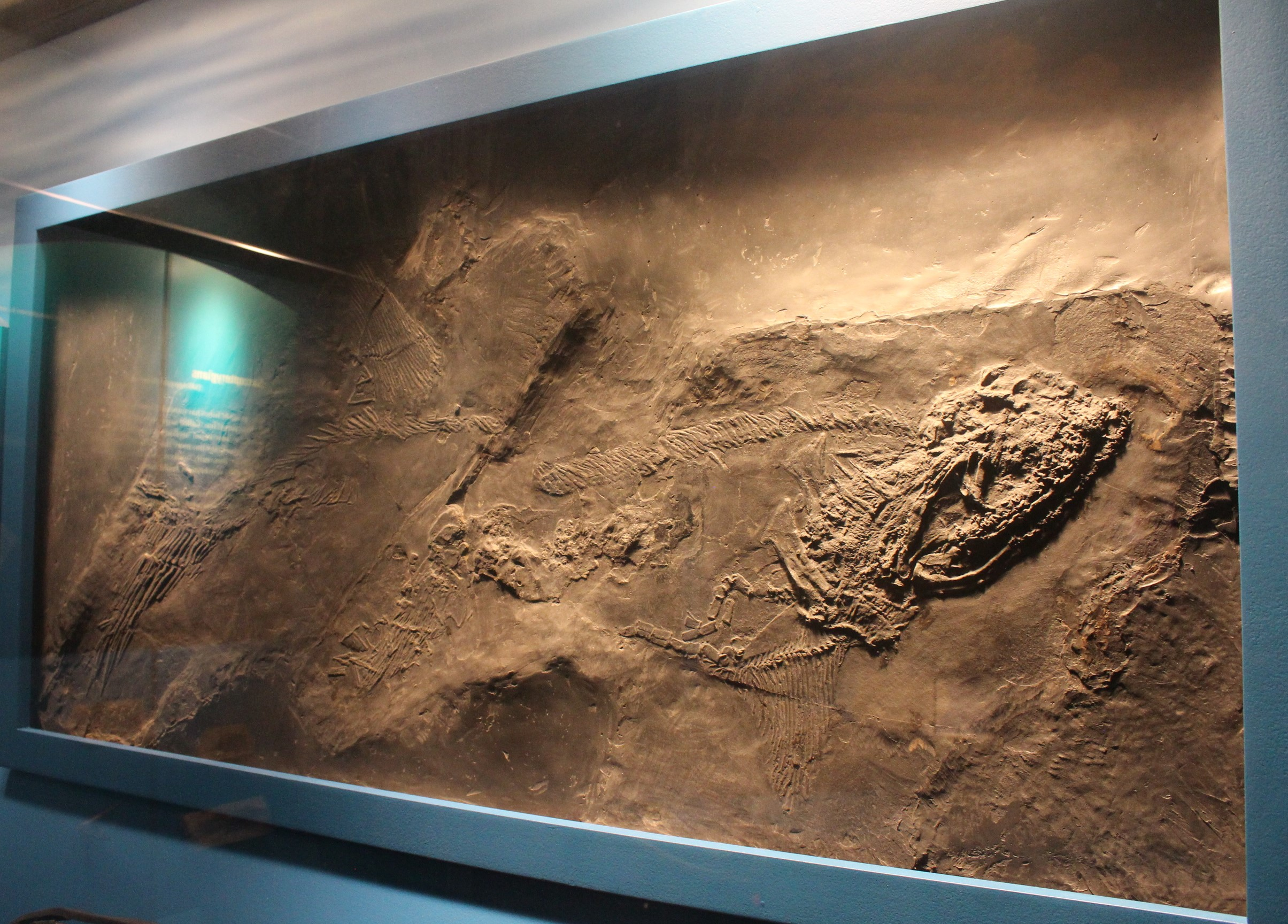
- Fossil specimen (FMNH PF 2202) of S. reniforme, Field Museum of Natural History
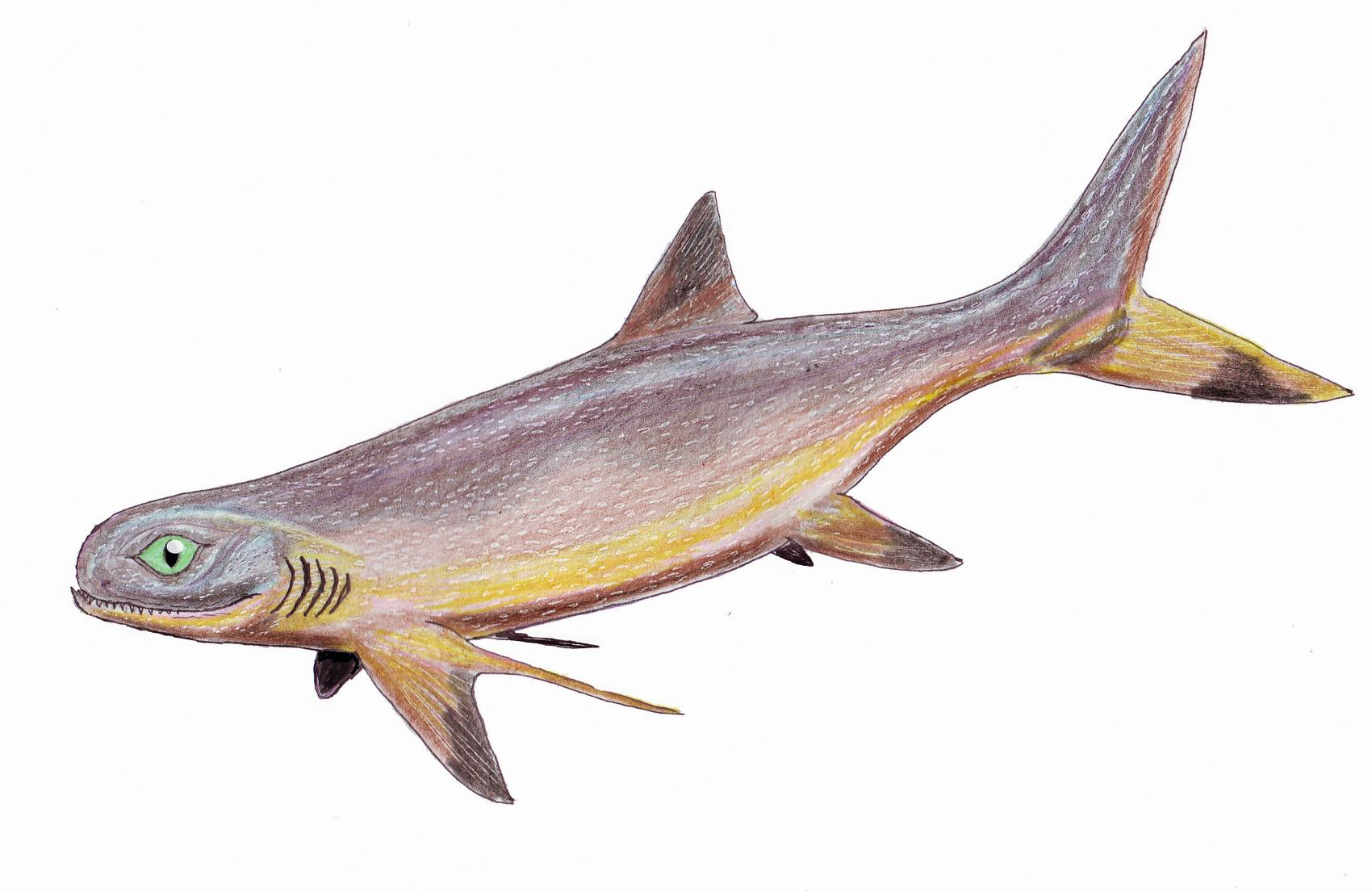
- Life restoration of S. reniforme

Scientific classification
- Domain: Eukaryota
- Kingdom: Animalia
- Phylum: Chordata
- Class: Chondrichthyes
- Order: †Symmoriiformes
- Family: †Symmoriidae
- Genus: †Symmorium; Cope, 1893
- Species: †S. reniforme

Binomial name
- †Symmorium reniforme Cope, 1893

= Symmorium =

Symmorium Temporal range: Devonian-Carboniferous, Famennian–Moscovian

Extinct genus of cartilaginous fishes

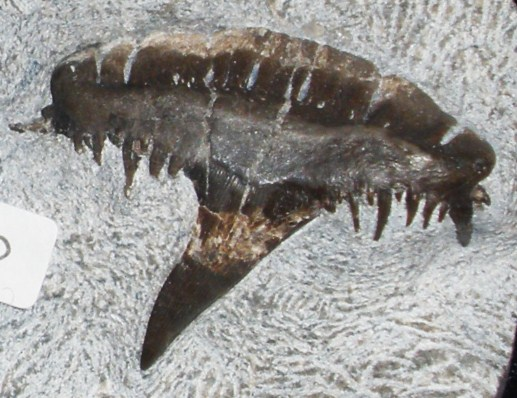
Tooth assigned to Symmorium

Symmorium is an extinct symmoriiform cartilaginous fish from the Devonian and Carboniferous of the United States (Illinois) and Russia. The type species, Symmorium reniforme, was named by Edward Drinker Cope in 1893, with other species assigned to the genus having since been reclassified into other genera such as Petalodus. Symmorium bears close similarity in size and appearance to Stethacanthus but lacks the "spine-brush complex" in place of the first dorsal fin. Some paleontologists think that the two forms represented the males and females of related species, while other scientists think they were distinct genera.
