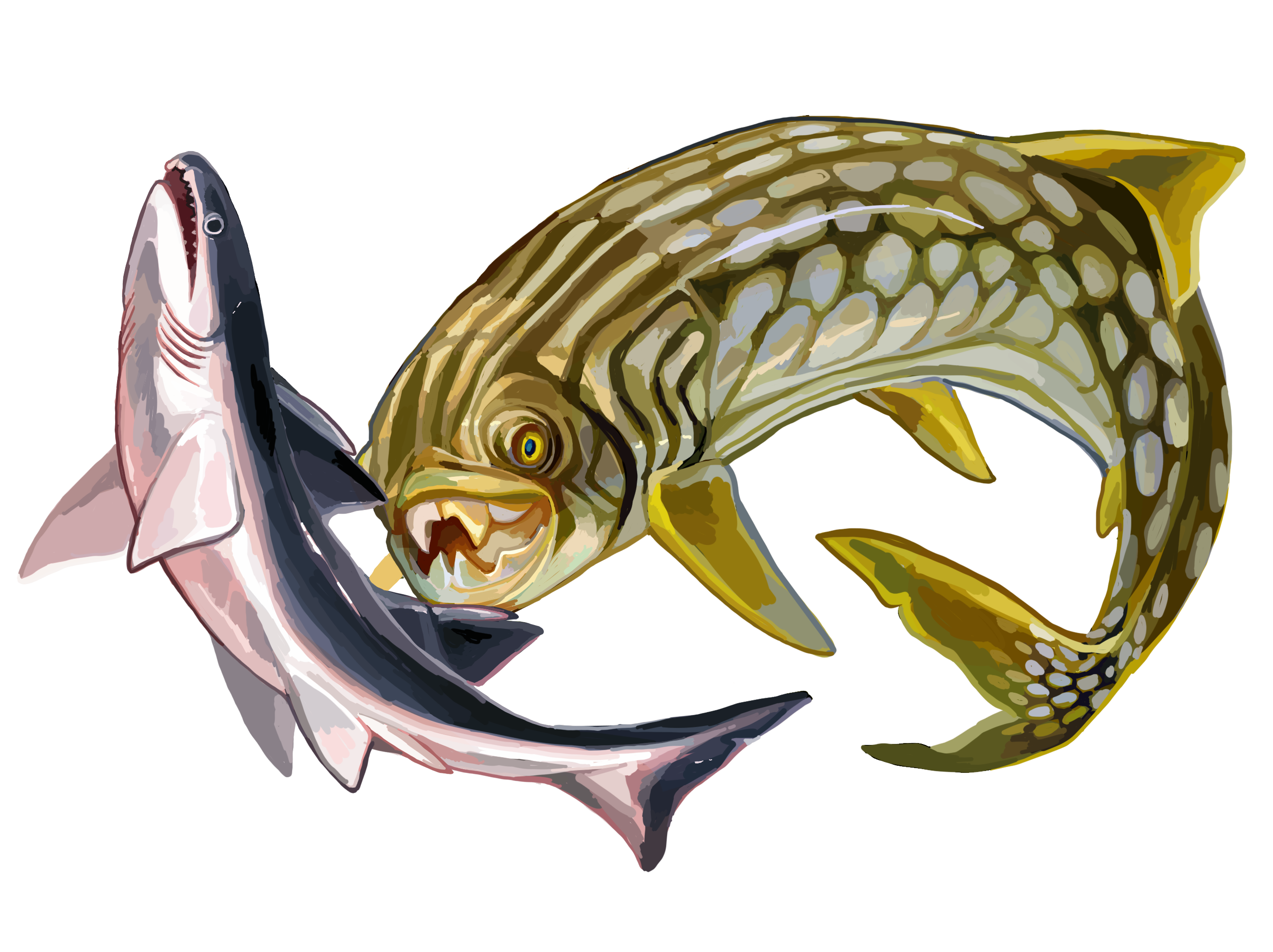
- Artist's reconstruction of Holdenius holdeni and its prey, an unidentified Ctenacanth chondrichthyan

Scientific classification
- Kingdom: Animalia
- Phylum: Chordata
- Class: †Placodermi
- Order: †Arthrodira
- Suborder: †Brachythoraci
- Clade: †Eubrachythoraci
- Clade: †Pachyosteomorphi
- Clade: †Aspinothoracidi
- Genus: †Holdenius; Dunkle and Bungart, 1942

Type species
- Holdenius holdeni Dunkle and Bungart, 1942

= Holdenius =

Holdenius Temporal range: Famennian

Extinct genus of fishes

Holdenius is an extinct genus of arthrodire placoderm fish which lived during the Late Devonian period.

== Description ==
Holdenius was a large arthrodire, reaching lengths of around 3 m (9.8 ft). This placoderm is known only from isolated jaw bones, and little is known about it except that it is relatively morphologically similar to its more famous relative Dunkleosteus, with which it shared a spatial and temporal range.

Holdenius was a piscivorous animal that used its sharp shearing gnathal plates to seize and cleave its prey into manageable pieces. One articulated specimen of this placoderm from the Upper Devonian Cleveland Shale was preserved adjacent to the remains of its prey; a Ctenacanth chondrichthyan, which had been bitten in half. Considering its prey was over half its size, it can be inferred that Holdenius was an exceptionally aggressive nektonic predator. An anterior dorsal spine from the ctenacanth was found lodged in the palate and extending into the braincase of the Holdenius, likely killing it instantly.

Holdenius is a monospecific genus. Previously classified as belonging to the family Dunkleosteidae, it is now considered to be a member of Aspinothoracidi, the sister clade to Dunkleosteoidea.
