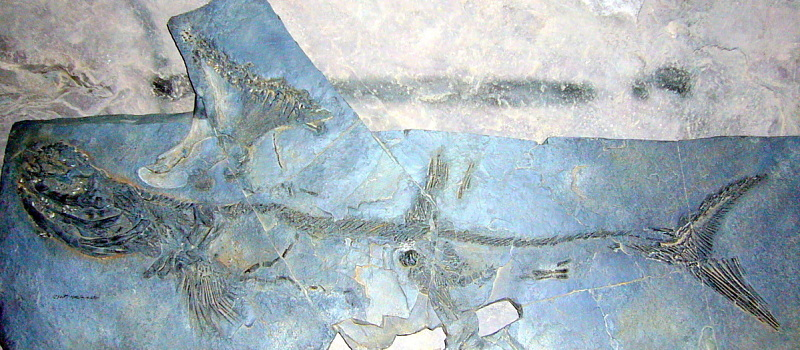
- Holotype fossil
- Reconstruction

Scientific classification
- Kingdom: Animalia
- Phylum: Chordata
- Class: Chondrichthyes
- Order: †Symmoriiformes
- Family: †Stethacanthidae
- Genus: †Akmonistion
- Species: †A. zangerli

Binomial name
- †Akmonistion zangerli Coates & Sequeira, 2001

= Akmonistion =

Akmonistion Temporal range: Serpukhovian

Extinct genus of cartilaginous fishes

Akmonistion is an extinct genus of cartilaginous fish that lived in the Early Carboniferous. The genus contains a single species, A. zangerli, discovered by Stan Wood in 1982. It is distinguished by an unusual enlarged formation of the dorsal fin, called a "spine-brush complex", of unknown function. This is also found in the better known genus Stethacanthus. Remains have only been found near Bearsden in Scotland, where a complete fossil was uncovered in 1982. It reached 62 cm (24 in) in length. The genus name is derived from the Ancient Greek “akmon” (“anvil”) + “istion” (“sail”) referring to the appearance of its first dorsal fin.

Render of two male A. zangerli individuals
