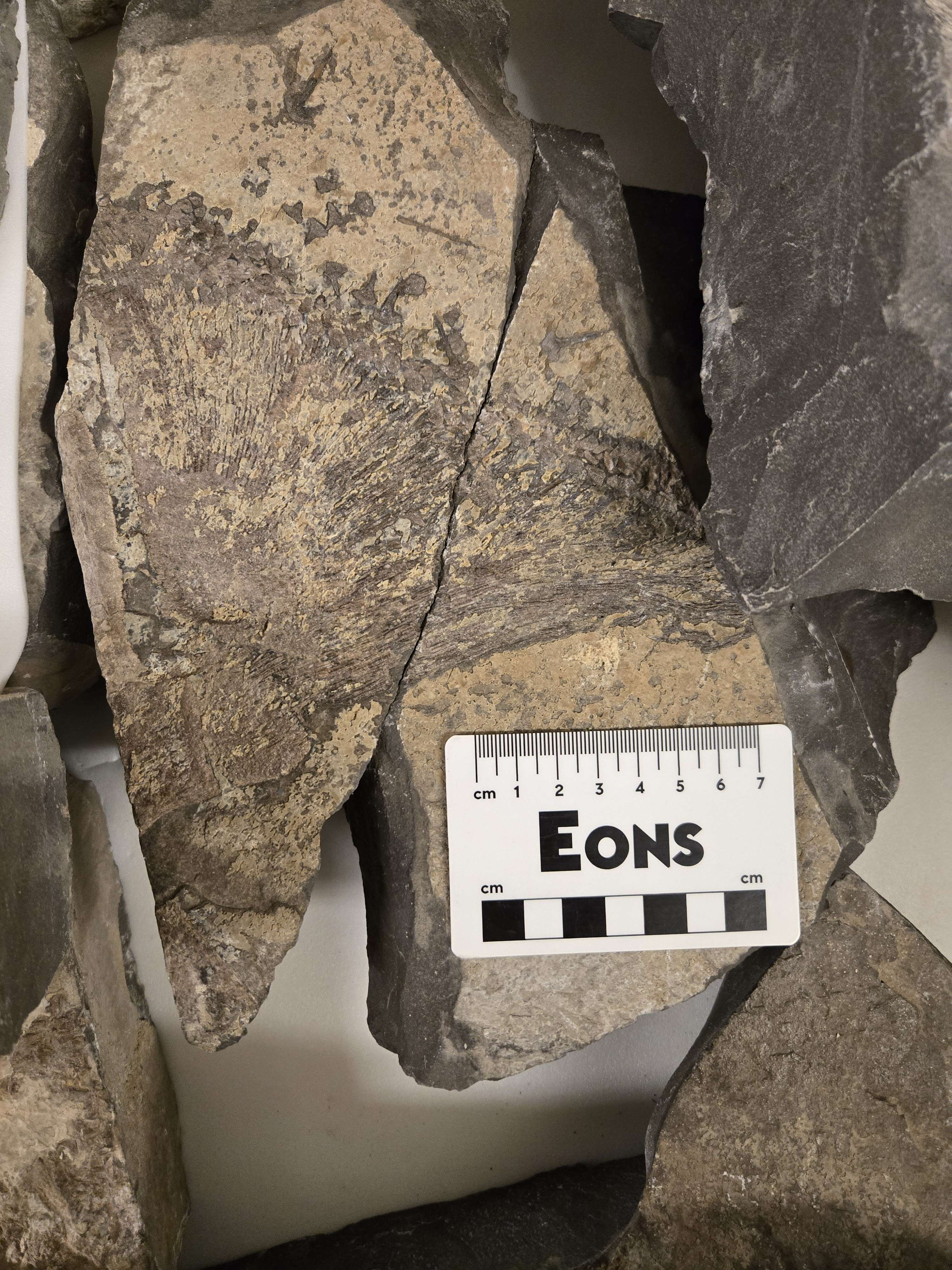
- Fossil spine of S. altonensis
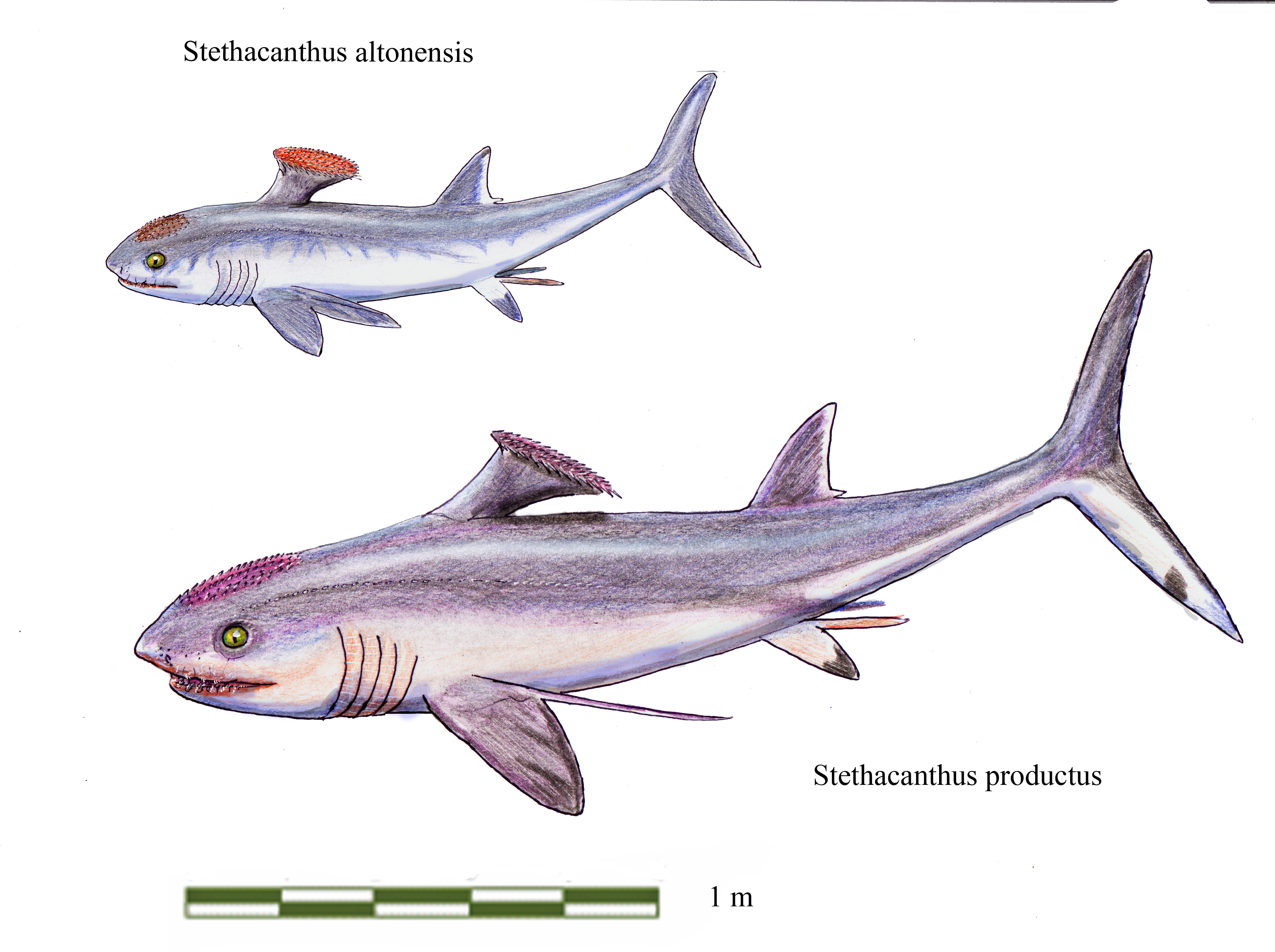
- Restoration of S. altonensis and S. productus

Scientific classification
- Kingdom: Animalia
- Phylum: Chordata
- Class: Chondrichthyes
- Order: †Symmoriiformes
- Family: †Stethacanthidae
- Genus: †Stethacanthus; Newberry, 1889

Type species
- Stethacanthus altonensis St. John and Worthen, 1875

Other species
- S. concavus Ginter, 2018; S. gansuensis Wang et al., 2004; S. neilsoni; S. praecursor Hussakof & Bryant, 1918; S. resistens; S. thomasi; S. productus Newberry, 1897

Synonyms
- Symmorium reniforme? Cope, 1893

= Stethacanthus =

Stethacanthus Temporal range: 382.7–298.9 Ma Late Devonian to Late Carboniferous

Extinct genus of cartilaginous fishes

Stethacanthus is an extinct genus of shark-like cartilaginous fish which lived from the Late Devonian to Late Carboniferous epoch, dying out around 298.9 million years ago. Fossils have been found in Australia, Asia, Europe and North America.

== Etymology ==
Stethacanthus comes from Ancient Greek στῆθος (stēthos), meaning "chest", and ἄκανθος (ákanthos), meaning "spine, thorn". The name refers to the distinctive anvil-shaped first dorsal fin and spine borne by mature males of the genus.

== Description ==
Stethacanthus had different sizes depending on species, S. altonensis had length about 1.5 metres (4.9 ft), while S. productus reached 3 metres (9.8 ft). In many respects, it had a shark-like appearance. However, it is best known for its unusually shaped dorsal fin, which resembled an anvil or ironing board. Small spikes (enlarged versions of the dermal denticles that commonly cover sharks' skin) covered this crest, and the shark's head as well. The crest may have played a role in mating rituals, aided in clamping to the belly of larger marine animals, or been used to frighten potential predators.

Like other members of Stethacanthidae, Stethacanthus had unique pelvic girdles, single-crowned and non-growing scales, a pectoral fin composed of metapterygium with an accompanying ‘whip’ attached and a distinctive first dorsal fin and spine, termed the spine-brush complex. The neurocranium had a narrow suborbital shelf, a broad supraorbital shelf, a short otico-occipital division, large orbits, and cladodontic teeth that aligned precisely. In addition to these features, Stethacanthus also had male pelvic claspers with non-prismatic calcified cartilage at the distal ends.

=== Spine-brush complex ===
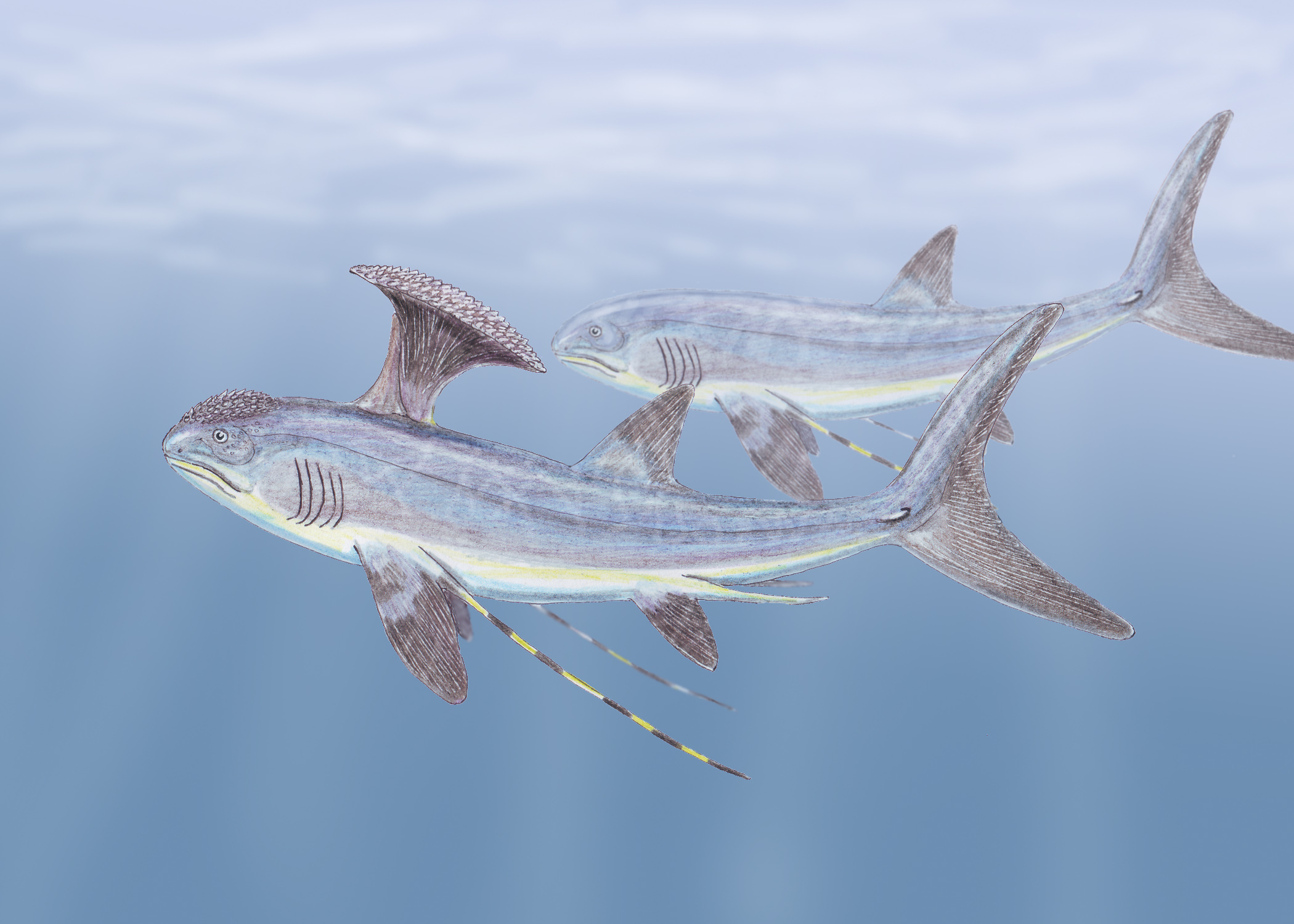
Restoration of a S. altonensis pair

The spine-brush complex occupies the same site as the first dorsal fin on other ratfish and contains a basal plate extending inside a usually posterior-pointing dorsal spine composed of trabecular dentine. The spines resemble those of modern sharks and rays but curiously lack any enamel-like surface tissue. The trabecular dentine contains patches of fibers suggesting attachments to the epaxial musculature. The way these muscles would have been positioned implies that the spine could have been moved in anterio-posterior direction. The so-called "brush" is not fibrous as was originally believed, but consists of a number of parallel, membranous tubules made of globular calcified cartilage. The brush base and basal plate are covered in a thin, acellular bone layer. Zangerl asserts that these tubules are similar to erectile tissues in humans, and thus the complex may have been inflatable. The complex itself is covered in up to nine rows of large denticles pointing anteriorly. The dorsal side of the head has its own collection of denticles which point posteriorly. The presence of these large denticles has led to theories that the spine-brush complex in combination with the denticles on the head was used to scare away predators by simulating the mouth of a larger fish. The complex has been affirmed only in males, and only in those males that have reached sexual maturity. Whether the complex was present in females of the species is still unknown. Another theory for the spine-brush complex is that it was involved either in attracting a mate or in the mating process itself.

=== Pectoral fin whip ===
The pectoral fins of Stethacanthus were composed of the triangular-shaped metapterygium observed in modern-day sharks, but had an additional long, metapterygial structure called a fin whip. These fin whips contain at least 22 axial cartilages and extended past the pelvic fins. The three most anterior axials are shorter than the more posterior axials. The purpose of the fin whips is unknown but it has been suggested that they were used during mating.

=== Teeth and denticles ===
The tooth files are whorl-shaped and the palatoquadrate is scalloped with 6-7 recesses to allow for the tooth families. The individual teeth are widely separated from each other in the tooth whorls. The teeth themselves are of the cladodont variety; the bases of the teeth are broadest on the lingual side, and each support a single large cusp and two pairs of smaller accessory cusps for a total of five cusps. The medial and most lateral cusps are the most fluted. The teeth appear to be mostly orthodentine, but when viewed in cross-section, change abruptly to osteodentine. The enameloid is single-layered, overlaying the thick mantle of orthodentine. In addition to the dentition teeth, there are also a number of buccopharyngeal denticles lining the oropharynx. The denticles lining the top of the head and the top of the spine-brush complex are larger than the dentition teeth, and they appear as elongate monocuspid denticles.

=== Pelvic girdles and claspers ===
In Stethacanthus, the pelvic girdles consist of sheets of prismatic cartilage, each in the shape of a subtriangular, rounded plate. The anterior edge of each girdle is slightly concave while the posterior is convex. There appears to be no union of the two plates. There are two types of pelvic girdles found in stethacanthids: The primitive condition and the derived condition. In the primitive condition, the pelvic girdles have a metapterygial element supporting only one or two radials and most of the fin radials are attached directly to the pelvic plate. The derived condition differs in that there is a much higher number of radials supported by the pelvic plate. This feature, accompanied with a broadening of the pelvic girdle in order to accommodate the increased number of radials is a characteristic of Stethacanthus and other symmorriids. The males had claspers that were club-shaped at the distal ends and composed of non-prismatic globular calcified cartilage.

=== Caudal fin ===
There was some caudal fin variety among Stethacanthus species; while some had low angle heterocercal tails, some had tails approaching homocercal. The broad hypochordal lobe was supported by long, splayed fin radials.

== Paleobiology ==
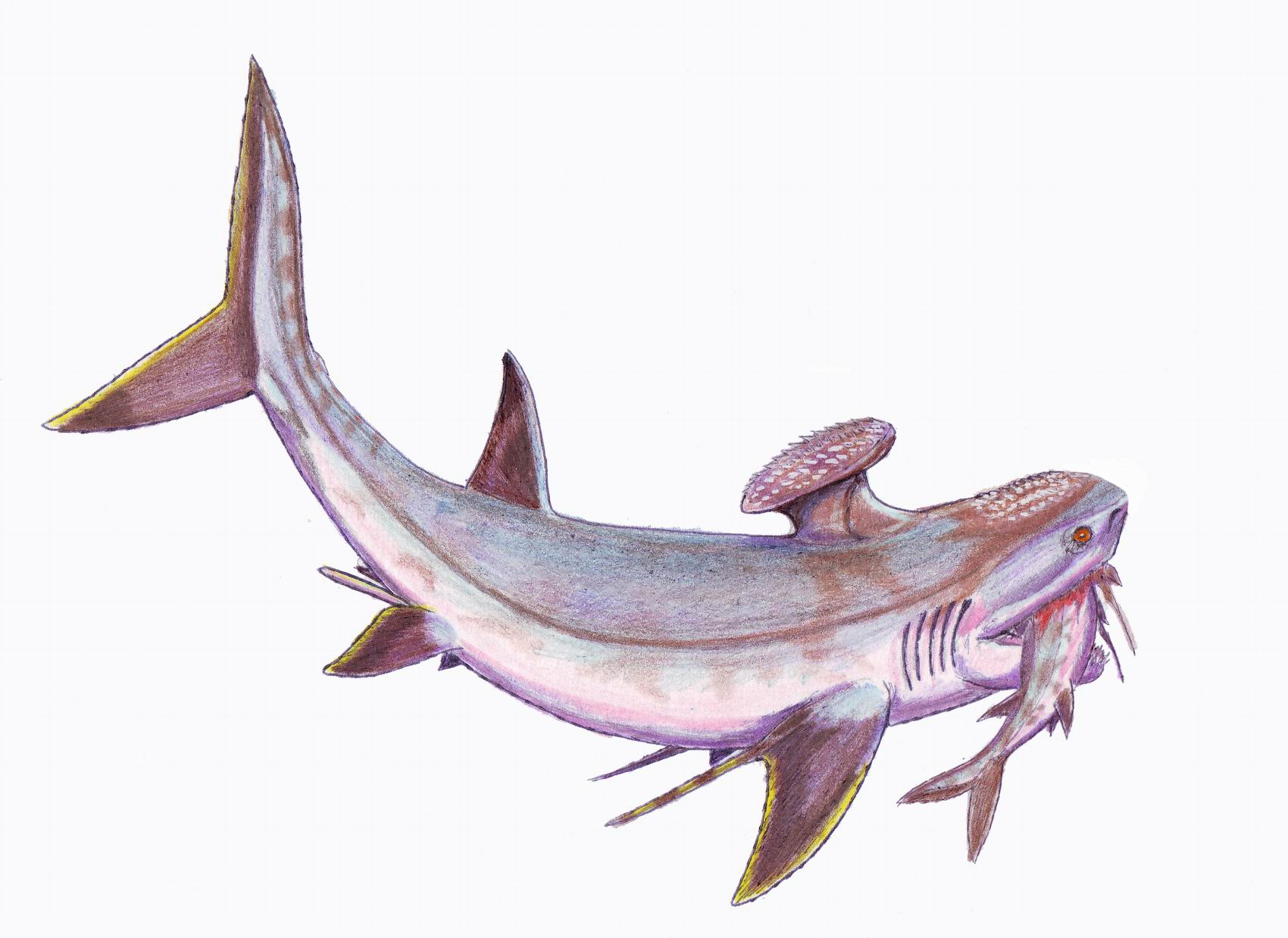
Restoration of S. productus with prey

It is certain that Stethacanthus was a carnivore, and considering its small size probably fed on brachiopods and crinoid ossicles like other sharks of its time. Additionally, as the spine-brush complex is rather a large structure, it seems likely that, in combination with the forward-facing denticles on the structure, it would have produced a drag force during fast locomotion. Therefore, Stethacanthus was probably a slow-moving shark. The fins of Stethacanthus were also smaller than in other sharks of the same size, and their teeth were also on the small side relative to other small Paleozoic sharks, suggesting that Stethacanthus may have been a bottom-dweller. Considering that most of the Stethacanthus specimens were recovered in the Bear Gulch Limestone in Montana, it is possible that this area was not only a breeding ground for other sharks but also for Stethacanthus, suggesting that they were migratory.

== History ==
The several species of Stethacanthus discovered in the late 1800s were established based solely upon isolated spines, which initially confused paleontologist John Strong Newberry into thinking the spines constituted a new kind of fin. He originally believed that the spines were part of the pectoral fins and that they were not bilaterally symmetrical. Meanwhile, the first associated skeletal remains found in the Mississippian of Montana and the Devonian and Mississippian of Ohio remained undescribed for nearly a century. Since complete skeletons were extremely rare, Stethacanthus classification was vague and based on few characteristics. It was not until 1974 that the family Stethacanthidae was defined by Richard Lund because Stethacanthus differed so greatly from other elasmobranchs of the time. Relative classifications of symmoriids compared to stethacanthids are still debated. More Stethacanthus specimens have been discovered, expanding their range from the Midwestern United States to the Lower Carboniferous of Bearsden, Scotland and the Lower Tournaisian of the Tula Region of Central Russia and China. Stethacanthus teeth have been recovered from the Frasnian-Famennian Napier Formation and the Tournaisian Laurel Formation and Moogooree Limestone in Western Australia. A partial palate and jawbone referred to a Stethacanthus sp. has also been recovered from the Bonaparte Basin, Western Australia.

== Classification ==
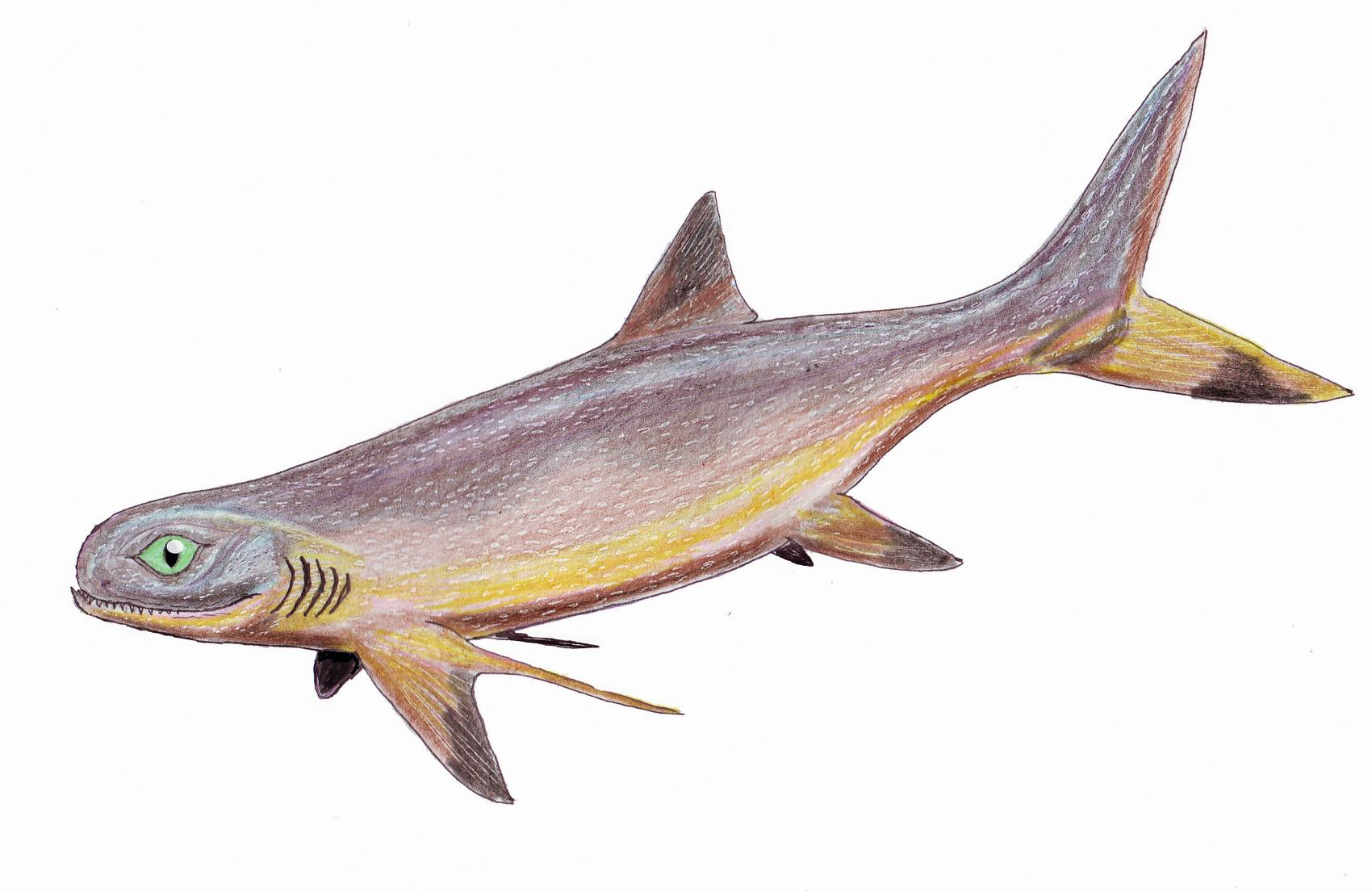
Restoration of the possible synonym Symmorium reniforme

The presence of globular calcified cartilage in both the spine-brush complex base plate and brush and in the claspers is interesting because it is the first record of such a large mass of globular calcified cartilage in chondrichthyan. The high presence of globular calcified cartilage raises several questions about the evolution of sharks. It is possible that prismatic cartilage, a defining feature of chondrichthyans, is an evolutionary derivative of globular calcified cartilage. If this were the case, primitive chondrichthyans would have appeared with shark-like scales based instead on globular calcified cartilage. Another feature of note is the thin, acellular bone layer coating the brush and baseplate of the spine-brush complex. It is possible that the coating on the spine-brush complex is the first record of endoskeletal bone in primitive chondrichthyans, and that these endoskeletal features were lost in extant chondrichthyans. It is also possible that the fin spine could be a unique distribution of dermal skeleton and thus derived from neural crest. Following this assumption, the brush would be a fin-baseplate extension. The endoskeletal location and absence of fin radials supports the latter hypothesis.

Taxonomic relationships are hard to define for Stethacanthus as there is much variability in the characteristics of the discovered specimens. Chondrichthyes is a monophyletic group characterized by the development of endoskeletal tesserae (mineralized blocks of cartilage) and internal fertilization. Chondrichthyes is further divided into two subclasses: Elasmobranchii and Holocephali. Stethacanthids have been classified as a member of the group Paleoselachii, which is a subdivision of Elasmobranchii. Stethacanthus has been further classified as part of the order Symmoriida, a classification that has sparked a controversy. There are two main hypotheses regarding this classification. One hypothesis states that the order Symmoriida consists of the families Symmoriidae, Stethacanthidae and Falcatidae and thus are a monophyletic group. Another is that symmoriids are actually the females of stethacanthids or are derived from stethacanthids. This hypothesis is due to the fact that stethacanthids and symmoriids are poorly defined; symmoriids are thought to lack a spine-brush complex but are otherwise identical to Stethacanthidae. Stethacanthids are identified by the presence of a spine-brush complex, which is in some cases non-existent (e.g. juvenile males), making the certain classification of stethacanthids and symmoriids difficult.

More recently, Symmoriiformes as a whole has been reclassified as part of Holocephali, meaning that Stethacanthus may have been more closely related to modern chimaeras than to sharks.

== See also ==
- Stethacanthidae
- Symmoriiformes
- Akmonistion
