= Chagrinia =

Chagrinia Temporal range: Famennian

Scientific classification
- Kingdom: Animalia
- Phylum: Chordata
- Class: Actinistia
- Genus: †Chagrinia; Schaeffer, 1962
- Species: †C. enodis

Binomial name
- †Chagrinia enodis Schaeffer, 1962

Extinct genus of fishes

Chagrinia is an extinct genus of prehistoric marine coelacanth which lived during the Late Devonian period.

The holotype, Chagrinia enodis, was found eroded out of the Chagrin Shale in the Euclid Creek Reservation in Cleveland, Ohio, in 1960 by a local citizen.

The fossil material is poorly preserved, but the species appears to exhibit a slender body, narrow caudal peduncle, symmetrical tail, and fin rays that outnumber the endochondral supports. The scales appeared to be unornamented, but that may be a preservational artefact.

Some studies have placed it with the Diplocercidae, while others have found it to be more basal.

== Bibliography ==
- Forey, Peter L. (1997). History of the Coelacanth Fishes. London: Kluwer. ISBN 9780412784804.
