= Ingression coast =

Coast shaped by penetration of the sea

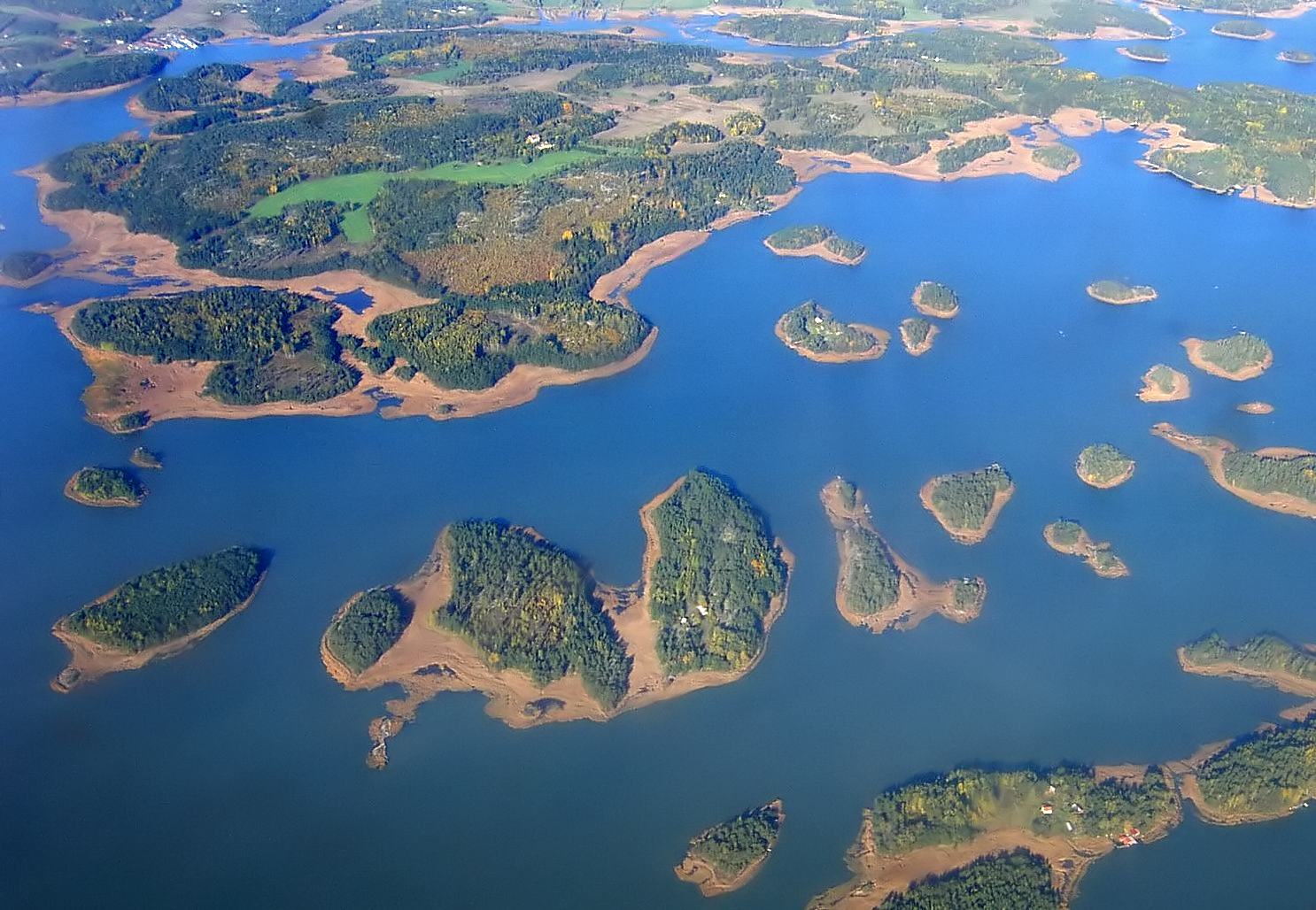
An ingression coast, the Archipelago Sea off Naantali (Finland)

An ingression coast or depressed coast is a generally level coastline that is shaped by the penetration of the sea as a result of crustal movements or a rise in the sea level.

Such coasts are characterised by a subaerially formed relief that has previously experienced little deformation by littoral (tidal) processes, because the sea level, which had fallen by more than 100 metres during the last glacial period, did not reach its current level until about 6,000 years ago.

Depending on the geomorphological shaping of the flooded landform – e.g. glacially or fluvially formed relief – various types of ingression coast emerge, such as rias, skerry and fjard coasts as well as förde and bodden coasts.

== See also ==
- Marine transgression
