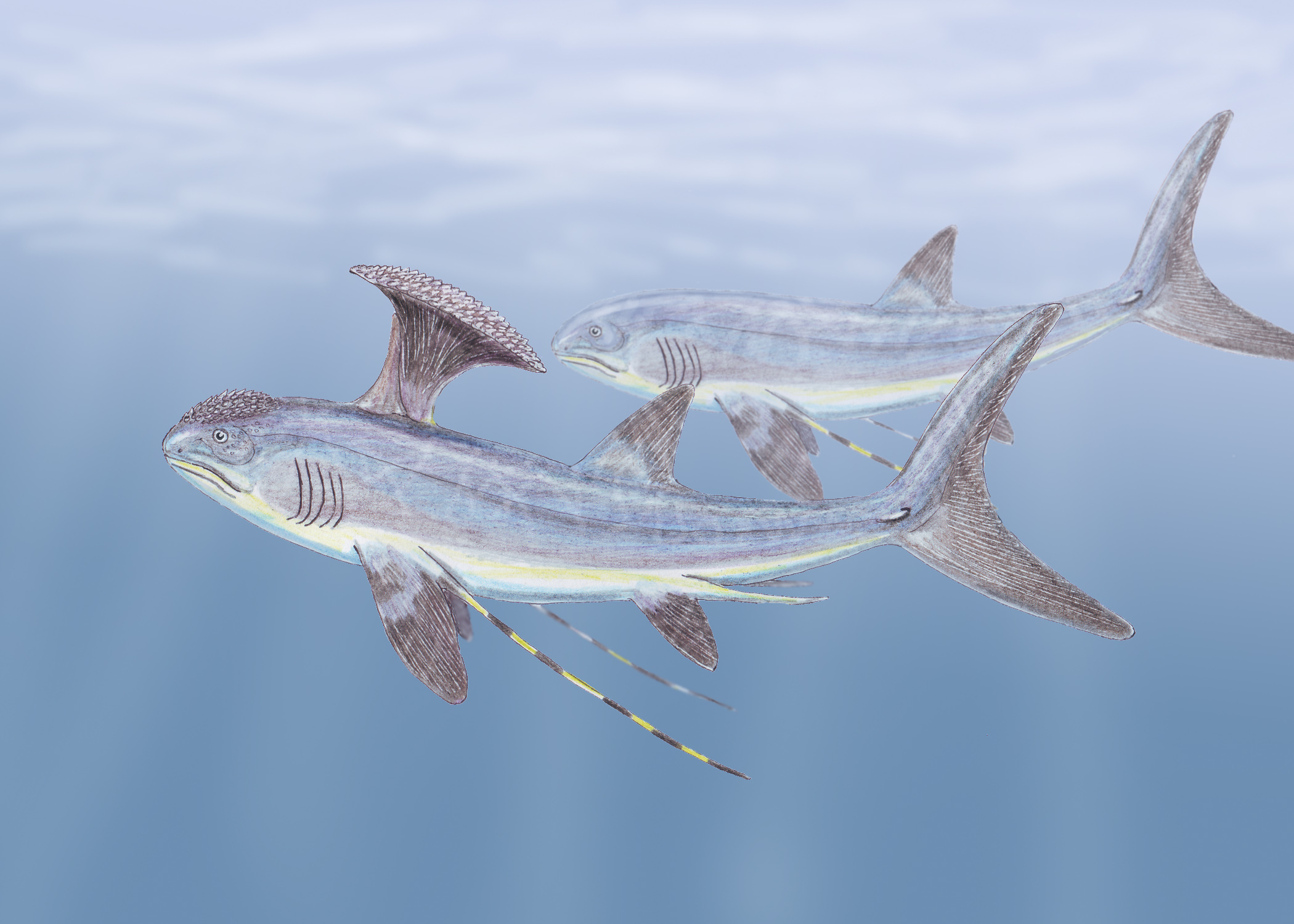
- Stethacanthus altonensis

Scientific classification
- Kingdom: Animalia
- Phylum: Chordata
- Class: Chondrichthyes
- Order: †Symmoriiformes
- Family: †Stethacanthidae

Genera
- Akmonistion; Damocles; Stethacanthus

= Stethacanthidae =

Stethacanthidae Temporal range: Upper Devonian to Carboniferous (Middle Pennsylvanian), 382.7–323.2 Ma

Extinct family of cartilaginous fishes

Stethacanthidae is an extinct family of prehistoric sharks. It is estimated to have existed approximately between 380 and 300 million years ago. Members of this family are noted for their peculiar dorsal fin.

== Introduction ==
Complete skeleton of Akmonistion zangerli (HMV8246, Hunterian Museum, University of Glasgow). Photograph taken by Dr. Keith Ingham, published in Coates & Sequira, 2001.

The taxonomic history of the Family Stethacanthidae has been rather complicated because the findings of complete skeletons are very unusual, and as result early workers such as St. John & Worthen, and Newberry were unable to recognise the association of the spine, dentition teeth, and dermal denticles of these sharks. The genus Stethacanthus was established by Newberry (1889) for a series of large thin walled, cartilage-cored spines encountered in Mississippian (Carboniferous Period) rocks of the mid-continental United States. Decomposition of the internal cartilage and compression during burial resulted in distortion of the spines, leading Newberry to misinterpret them, he believed that the spines belonged to pectoral and pelvic fins of a new species of shark. The first associated skeletal remains, from the Mississippian of Montana and the Devonian and Mississippian of Ohio, were not described until a century later. The Family Stethacanthidae was described by Richard Lund in 1974, he argued that "Stethacanthus represents an experiment in elasmobranch evolution that is significantly divergent enough to warrant family-level separation". This classification was later corroborated by another authors (e.g. Zangerl, 1990). Further reports of material attributed to Stethacanthus have extended its range to the Mississippian of Oklahoma, the Lower Tournaisian of Central Russia and the basal Namurian/Serpukhovian of Scotland.

== Description ==
Stethacanthus altonensis is the type species of the family Stethacanthidae, therefore, all stethacanthids meet certain morphological characters best represented in this species. Stethacanthids are medium-sized cladodont shark-like holocephalians with a short rostrum, broad supraorbital region, and short otic region. The teeth on jaws are of cladodont type, displaying 5 cusps (pentacuspids). The first dorsal fin bears a large, thin walled compressed spine, displaying no ornamentation and concave anteriorly. This dorsal spine is fitted over a long basal plate and articulating at its base with the apex of a high triangular fin. The second dorsal fin is fitted over a very small, anterior basal plate apparently lacking a spine. The entire dorsal surface of head and first dorsal fin are covered with enlarged single cusped denticles. Secondary sexual dimorphism is present, only mature males bear a first dorsal fin.

=== First dorsal fin and spine ===
The first dorsal fin is one of the strangest features of these fish. The fin itself is triangular and is composed of long, thin, calcified tubes radiating from the apex. The posterior dorsal surface of the first dorsal fin is covered with a belt of up to nine rows of enlarged dermal denticles. The spine, composed of trabecular dentine, is roughly a right triangle in shape, with the hypothenuse concave anterodorsally. The trabecular dentine contains a large number of fibres in the dorsal half of the spine. This suggests that, in life, a large portion of the spine was covered by connective tissue, probably anchoring the first dorsal fin.

==== Function ====
A shark with a structure on its back, such as a stethacanthid, could not have possibly been a fast swimmer. The first dorsal fin and spine could have produced a considerable amount of drag during fast locomotion. This suggests that Stethacanthids may have been rather sluggish bottom dwellers. The crowns of the dermal denticles on the first dorsal fin point forward and those on the head point backward, however it is unlikely that these were used for biting or tearing food. If the animal was disturbed by a potential predator while resting or feeding near the bottom it may have raised the head and tilted forward the first dorsal fin and spine, simulating a toothed open mouth of a much larger fish, therefore, an effective defence mechanism. However, only males possessed the "armoured" first dorsal fin and spine, and this suggests that the function was merely sexual display.

=== Teeth and denticles ===
Teeth are typical cladodont in form. They are composed of 5 cusps, the central being the largest, the two extreme lateral smaller, and the intermediate very small. Cusps are rounded in cross section, slightly curved inwards and strongly striated vertically. Modified denticles cover the dorsal surface of the head and upper edge of dorsal fin. Both sets of denticles are smooth, monocuspid and curved posteriorly. The denticles on the head are relatively uniform in size (about as high as the central cusps in the teeth), and rounded in cross section. The denticles on the edge of the dorsal fin have polygonal bases and are fitted together in a mosaic pattern. In the male, the denticles increase in height and decrease in curvature toward the midline of the fin, so that the central denticles reach 2 cm in height.

=== Pelvic girdles and claspers ===
Pelvic girdles fall into two types. The first, thought to be the primitive condition, bears virtually the entire pelvic fin. The second, consists of a prominent metapterygial plate. The claspers, in the male, are separated from the body of the fin by about four blocks of calcified cartilage.

=== Caudal fin ===
The caudal fin is heterocercal, but approaches a functional homocercal condition.

== Environment ==
Most Stethacanthids found come from the Bear Gulch Limestone of Montana. The Bear Gulch is a lagerstätte that is unique in preserving virtually an entire small marine bay of extremely brief duration in the late Mississippian (Heath Formation, Palaeozoic; 323Ma). During deposition, it was located approximately 12ºN latitude and was part of an extensive sabkha environment and subjected to monsoonal climatic regime. The bay was subject to minimal fluvial input and was opened to the East. It is likely that the diversity of the Bear Gulch fauna may be representative of upper Mississippian marine faunas, due to the accessibility to migratory forms and the bay likely provided breeding and nursery grounds for those not endemic to it. The most complete skeleton ever found has been published recently from the Manse Burn Formation (Serpukhovian) in Bearsden near Glasgow, Scotland. As well as the Bear Gulch Limestone, the lithology of this formation indicates that it was deposited under variable conditions of salinity with seasonal periodicity.

== Taxonomic relationships ==
Chondrichthyes is a monophyletic group divisible into two sister taxa, the Elasmobranchii and Holocephali, and the extant chondrichthyans are derivable from Mesozoic forms. Yet, the relationship of these with the Palaeozoic forms is still poorly understood. Chondrichthyes are distinguished based on a two unique autapomorphous character sets: the development of tesserae endoskeletal mineralisation and internal fertilisation with copulation. During the Carboniferous chondrichthyans radiated rapidly and expansively in all available aquatic regimes and some of the most bizarre forms originated during this period. Stethacanthids are classified within the division Paleoselachii, of the Subclass Elasmobranchii. On a lower taxonomical level, the classification of this group is very controversial. There are two main hypothesis:

- The Families Symmoriidae, Stethacanthidae and Falcatidae are included within the Order Symmoriiformes and form a monophyletic group.
- Stethacanthids are a very derived group of Paleoselachii sharks, defined by a highly modified first dorsal fin (only in adult males) and strong sexual dimorphism. This condition is also seen in symmoriids and is unique among known elasmobranchs of any time. So, either symmoriids are the females of some stethacanthids, or they are derived from this group.

The classification of symoriiform sharks (including the Families Stethacanthidae, Symmoriidae and Falcatidae) will remain a controversy until other complete specimens are found outside of the Bear Gulch lens.

== See also ==
- Falcatus
