= Dunkirk transgression =

Events of rising sea levels around the Low Countries in the late Roman period

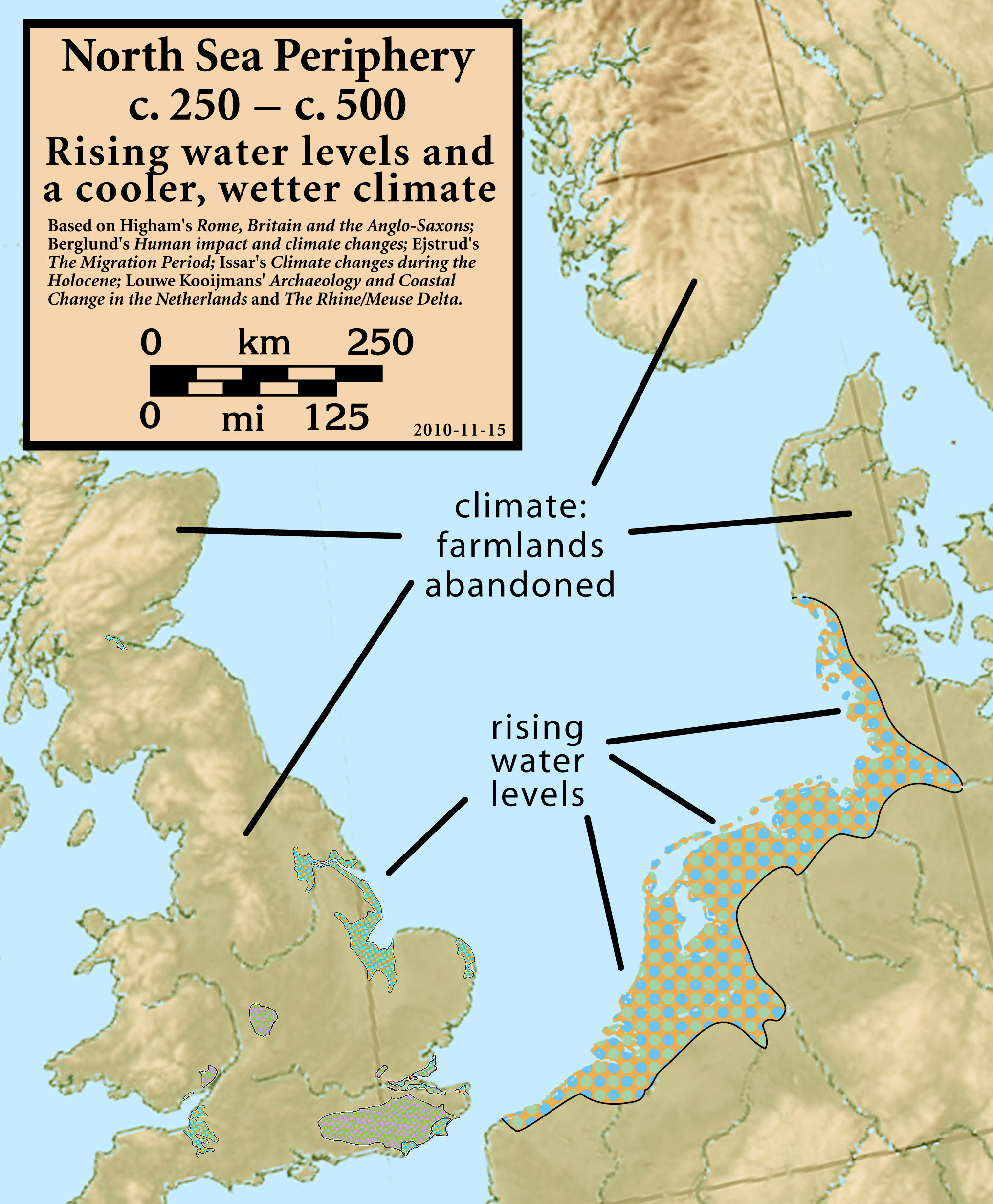
North Sea Periphery, c. 250–c. 500: High Water Levels and a generally cooling climate. Source: Higham's Rome, Britain and the Anglo-Saxons (ISBN 1-85264-022-7, 1992).

The Dunkirk transgressions were tidal bulges or other sea level-related marine transgressions (risings), often heightened by river floods, affecting the North Sea and adjoining low land. Most of this land is vulnerable to such events being below or approximately at sea level. Three events and mass evacuations, at least, are seen, some stretching to land above sea level today. The events affected the Low Countries and other land near the German Bight, Thames Estuary and The Wash. They spanned from the late Roman period until Early Medieval Europe.

== Outline knowledge ==
The exact scale of each event with notable human impact in duration, being hypothetically determined, is debated. The cause of each is also somewhat debated, however tidal bulges have been a continuing cyclical problem of the North Sea in the centuries since.

== Chronology ==
The main parts of the Low Countries were lightly populated until about 200 BC, when the climate and environment became more amenable to human habitation. Conditions remained favourable until 250 AD, and the region became densely populated.

Fens below sea level were highly vulnerable to a tidal bulge until great dams and sea walls were built as shown in the North Sea flood of 1953. A series of marine transgressions followed (in specialist academic literature called Dunkirk 0 through to Dunkirk IIIb) characterised by a rising water table and floods that left layers of clay on the land. The heaviest blow came with the "Dunkirk II transgression" that began in the 3rd century and continually worsened, leaving such low land uninhabitable, c. 350–c. 700 CE. People were forced to abandon their homes and emigrate. Archaeologists find evidence for this across the Rhine/Meuse delta (Zeeland, Brabant, parts of South Holland and Limburg); Friesland; Groningen; Ostfriesland, German Friesland and the Weser/Jade estuary; and Dithmarschen, Eiderstedt and Nordfriesland.

Across the Rhine/Meuse delta, the population became scant. Between the 5th and 7th centuries there were few centers of population there, and in the estuarine and peat areas no settlements have been found. The area would not be repopulated until the Carolingian Era. Zones with river clay were so regularly deposited with alluvial silt that habitation was almost impossible between the years 250 and 650.

Soil survey evidences and relative lack of human occupation artefacts leads scientists to theorise the Netherlands was largely underwater between the mid-third-century and 1050. This more narrow geographic range of depopulation covers the third Dunkirk Transgression period (alternatively suffixed III).

== See also ==
- Roman Warm Period, which lasted to about 400 AD/CE
- Anglo-Saxon settlement of Britain – Cultural and population changes in England c. 450 to 630 AD
- Frisii – Germanic tribe
