= Chagrin Shale =

Geological formation in the United States

- Stratigraphic range: Famennian
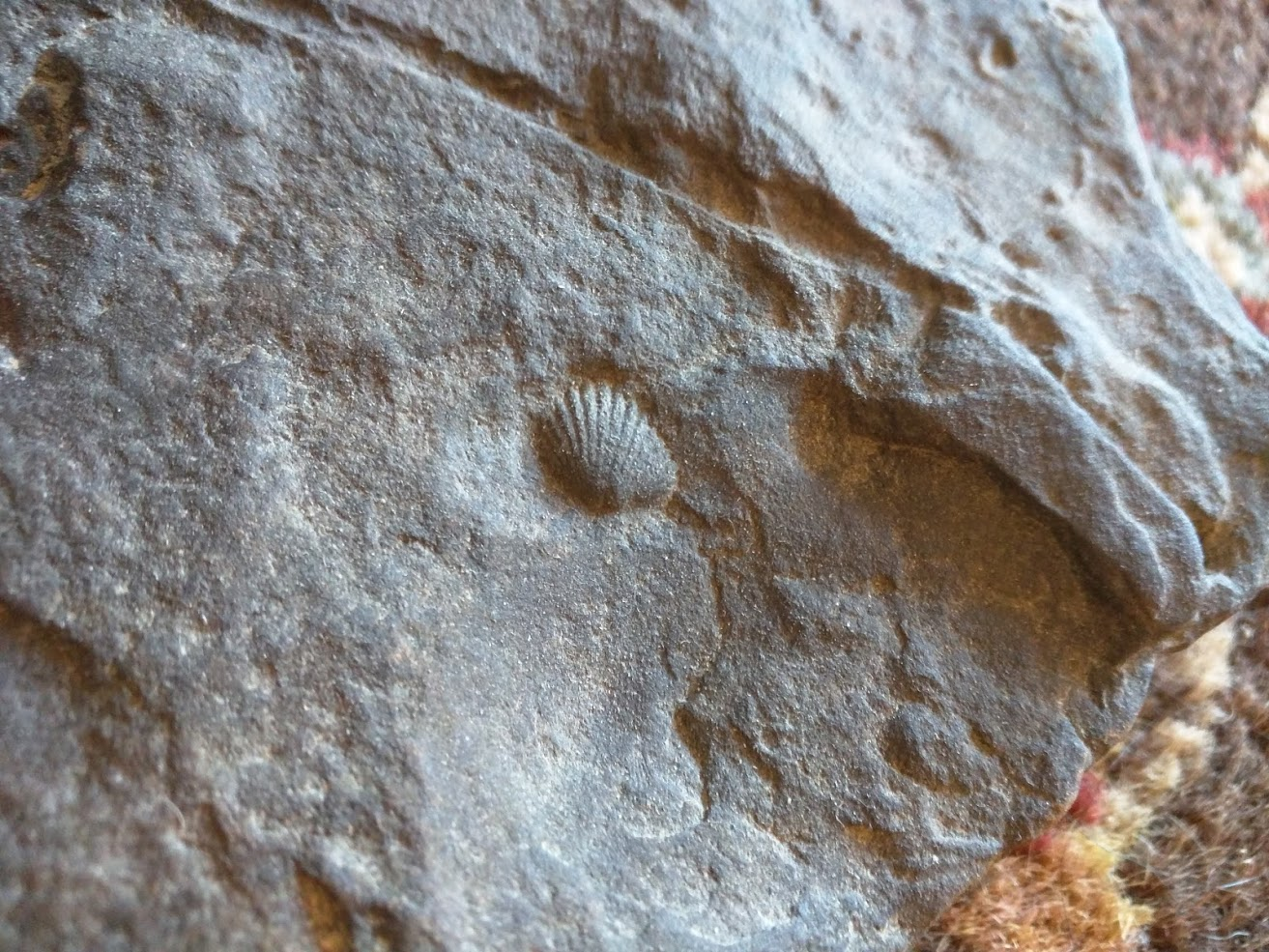
- A fossil in the Chagrin Shale
- Type: Formation
- Unit of: Ohio Shale
- Underlies: Cleveland Shale, Cussewago Sandstone
- Overlies: Huron Member

Lithology
- Primary: Shale

Location
- Region: Ohio
- Country: United States

Type section
- Named for: Chagrin River
- Named by: Charles S. Prosser

The Chagrin Shale is a shale geologic formation in the eastern United States that is approximately 365 million years old. The Chagrin Shale is a gray shale that begins thin and deep underground in north-central Ohio. As it proceeds east, the formation thickens, rises to the surface, and contains greater amounts of siltstone.

== Identification and name ==
The Chagrin Shale was identified in 1873 and named for the Chagrin River in 1903. John Strong Newberry, director of the Ohio State Geological Survey, first identified the formation in 1873. He called it the Erie Shale, but it was discovered that the name "Erie Shale" was preoccupied (already in use). Ohio State University professor of geology Charles S. Prosser further described the formation in 1903, and proposed the name "Chagrin Shale" because the shale presented such excellent outcroppings near the Chagrin River. Dr. Prosser's suggested nomenclature was adopted. Details of the type locality and of stratigraphic nomenclature of the Chagrin Shale, as used by the U.S. Geological Survey, are available on-line at the National Geologic Map Database.

== Description ==
The Chagrin Shale is a gray or greenish-gray argillaceous shale consisting of gray siltstone, silty gray shale, soft gray clay shale, and (uncommonly) grayish-black shale. The primary minerals in the shale are chlorite, illite, kaolinite, and quartz. Thin to massive beds of siltstone and sandstone are common. The amount of siltstone increases from west to east, at times forming beds up to 50 feet (15 m) thick. Thin layers of ironstone and marcasite, as well as concentrations of marcasite, occur throughout the shale.

The Chagrin Shale is classified as a weak to medium-strong rock, with a compressive strength anywhere from 5,000 pounds per square inch (34,000 kPa) to 15,000 pounds per square inch (100,000 kPa). The strength of the rock is much lower near soil/rock interface (where there is stress relief), and if there is weathering.

== Geographic extent ==
The Chagrin Shale is found in north-central and northeastern Ohio, and in northwestern Pennsylvania. The Chagrin Shale reaches a maximum thickness of 1,200 feet (370 m) in eastern Ohio. In Ohio, the Chagrin Shale is thin in the west, and thickens as it proceeds east.

The Chagrin Shale also extends south into West Virginia. The unit is also present in Kentucky, where it is mapped as the Chagrin Shale tongue of the Ohio Shale.

== Stratigraphic setting ==
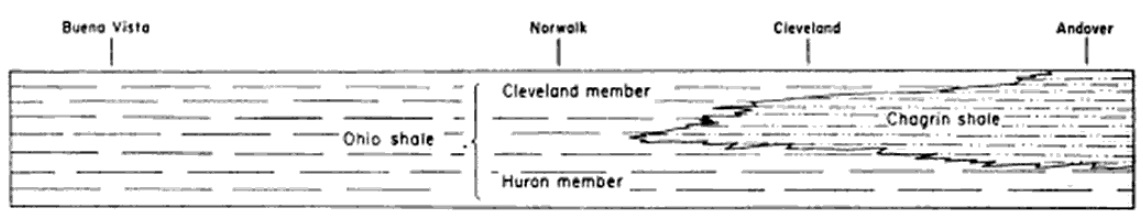
Schematic showing the graded relationship of the Cleveland Member and Huron Member of the Ohio Shale to the Chagrin Shale.

In Ohio, the Chagrin Shale underlies the Cleveland Shale and overlies the Huron Shale.

It is a member of the Ohio Shale. The Chagrin Shale grades into and between the Cleveland and Huron Shales.

== Fossils ==
The fossils found in the Chagrin Shale include the coelacanth fish Chagrinia, plants, and trace fossils including the ichnogenus Chagrinichnites.

== Age ==
The fossils in the Chagrin Shale indicate that the unit is of the Late Devonian period. More precisely, the Chagrin Shale is of the Famennian stage, which is approximately 365 million years old.

== Interpretation of depositional environments ==
The Chagrin Shale is interpreted as having accumulated in a shallow marine, offshore to nearshore environment of normal salinity and less than 45 meters water depth.

== Economic geology ==
Hydrogen sulfide and (more frequently) methane gas are found in the Chagrin Shale. On some occasions, these pockets of gas have proven quite large, and when reached by drills have vented for several weeks. Water infiltration of the formation on a sustained or large scale is rarely seen.

== See also ==
- List of fossiliferous stratigraphic units in Ohio

== Bibliography ==
- Camp, Mark J. (2006). Roadside Geology of Ohio. Missoula, Mont.: Mountain Press Publishing. ISBN 9780878425242.
- Ott, K.R.; Switalski, D.J.; Sadowksi, D.J. (1995). "Shaft Construction Through Natural Crude Oil". In Williamson, G.E.; Gowring, I.M. (eds.). Rapid Excavation and Tunneling Conference 1995 Proceedings. Englewood, Colo.: Society for Mining, Metallurgy, and Exploration. ISBN 9780873351324.
- Pepper, James F.; DeWitt, Wallace Jr.; Demarest, David F. (1954). Geology of the Bedford Shale and Berea Sandstone in the Appalachian Basin. Geologic Survey Professional Paper 259. Washington, D.C.: U.S. Government Printing Office.
- Prosser, Charles S. (1913). "Bulletin 15, The Devonian and Mississippian of Northeast Ohio". Geological Survey of Ohio. Volume XI. Columbus, Ohio: Ohio Geological Survey.
- Schafer, M.; Lukajic, B.; Pintabona, R.; Kritzer, M.; Shively, T.; Switalski, R. (2004). "Rock Tunneling at the Mill Creek Project". In Ozdemir, Levent (ed.). North American Tunneling 2004: Proceedings of the North American Tunneling Conference 2004. New York: A.A. Balkema Publishers. ISBN 9058096696.
- Vitale, Michael G.; Jarrett, Jarrett E.; Garrod, Brian; Gabriel, Doug (2013). "Innovations in Annular Grouting at the Euclid Creek Tunnel, Cleveland, Ohio". In DiPonio, Michael A.; Dixon, Chris (eds.). Rapid Excavation and Tunneling Conference 2013 Proceedings. Englewood, Colo.: Society for Mining, Metallurgy, and Exploration. ISBN 9780873353830.
- Wilmarth, M. Grace (1938). Lexicon of Geologic Names of the United States (Including Alaska). Part 1, A-L. Geologic Survey Bulletin 896. Washington, D.C.: U.S. Government Printing Office.
