= Onlap =

Geological phenomenon

Onlap or overlap is the geological phenomenon of successively wedge-shaped younger rock strata extending progressively further across an erosion surface cut in older rocks. It is generally associated with a marine transgression. It is a more general term than overstep, in which the younger beds overlap onto successively older beds. The opposite is offlap, in which each younger rock bed pinches out short of the full extent of the underlying older bed, typically due to a marine regression.
