= Crioselache =

Crioselache Temporal range: Asselian

Scientific classification
- Kingdom: Animalia
- Phylum: Chordata
- Class: Chondrichthyes
- Order: †Symmoriiformes
- Family: †Symmoriidae
- Genus: †Crioselache; Pauliv et al., 2023
- Species: †C. wittigi

Binomial name
- †Crioselache wittigi Pauliv et al., 2023

Extinct genus of

Crioselache is an extinct monotypic genus of symmoriid cartilaginous fish that lived in what is now Brazil during the Asselian stage of the Cisuralian epoch.

The generic name Crioselache comes from the Greek words krýos, meaning cold, and sélakhos, meaning cartilaginous fish, referencing the cold waters that this symmoriiform lived in during the Late Palaeozoic Ice Age. The specific epithet of the type species, Crioselache wittigi, honours the professor Dr. Ehrenfried Othmar Wittig, who discovered and collected the holotype fossil specimen.
