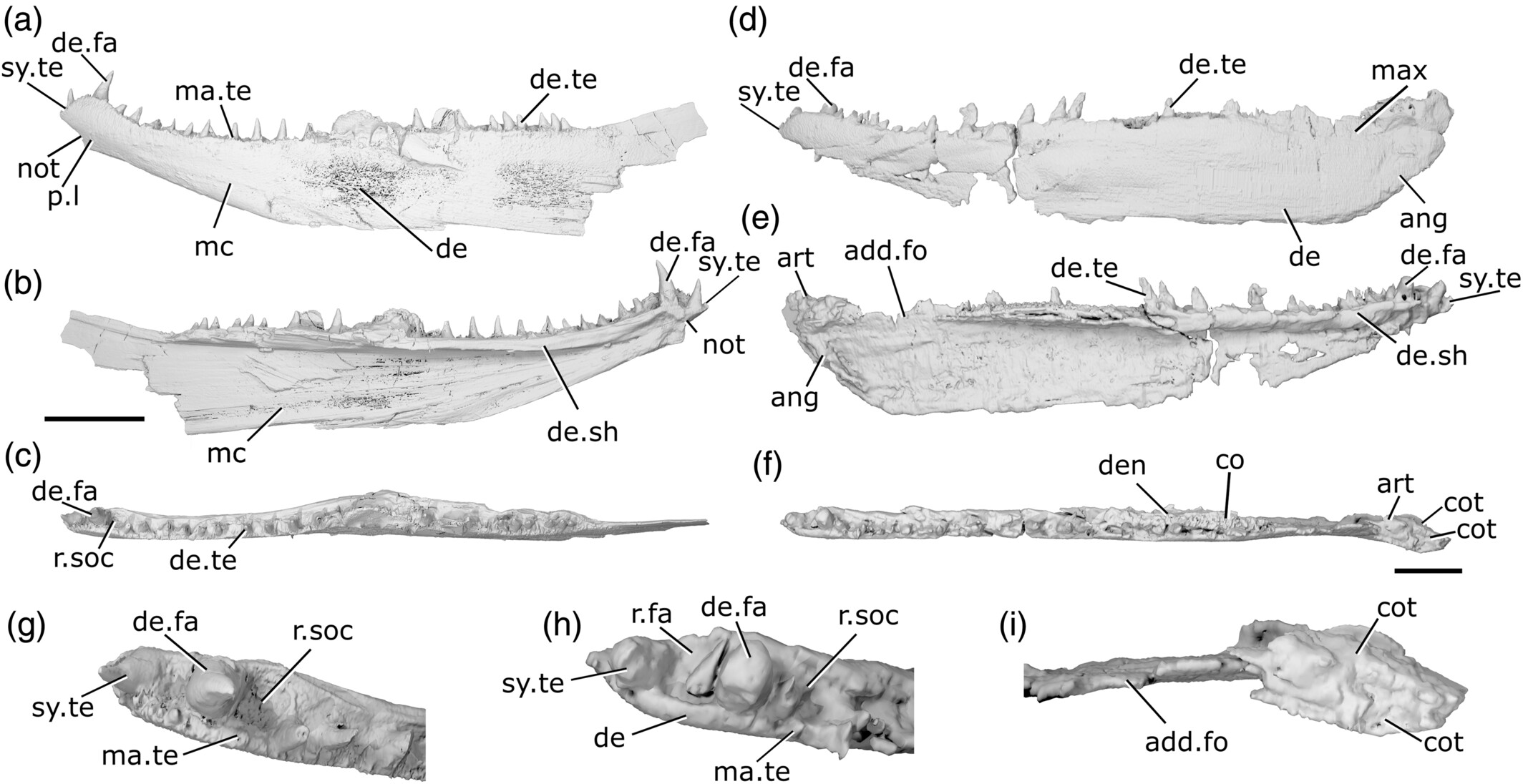
- Mandibles of T. clarki

Scientific classification
- Kingdom: Animalia
- Phylum: Chordata
- Class: Actinopterygii
- Genus: †Tegeolepis; Miller, 1892

= Tegeolepis =

Tegeolepis Temporal range: Late Devonian

Extinct genus of ray-finned fishes

Tegeolepis is an extinct genus of ray-finned fish, whose fossils have been found in the Upper Cleveland Shales in what is now the United States. T. clarki is the type and only species within this genus. It represents one of the first large piscivorous ray-finned fishes and exhibited robust pectoral fins and a fusiform body. A close relative of Tegeolepis, named Austelliscus ferox has been found in Middle Devonian strata from Southern Brazil. The phylogenetic relationships of Tegeolepis remain uncertain, but evidence indicates it would be placed outside the crown group of ray-finned fishes.
