= Marine regression =

Geologic event in which sea level falls relative to the land

Cross-sectional diagrams illustrating the shift of sedimentary facies during transgression (onlap) and regression (offlap)

A marine regression is a geological process occurring when areas of submerged seafloor are exposed during a drop in sea level. The opposite event, marine transgression, occurs when flooding from the sea covers previously-exposed land.

== Description ==
According to one hypothesis, regressions may be linked to a "slowdown in sea-floor spreading, leading to a generalized drop in sea level (as the mid-ocean ridges would take up less space)...." That view considers major marine regressions to be one aspect of a normal variation in rates of plate tectonic activity, which leads to major episodes of global volcanism like the Siberian Traps and the Deccan Traps, which in turn cause large extinction events.

Evidence of marine regressions and transgressions occurs throughout the fossil record, and the fluctuations are thought to have caused or contributed to several mass extinctions, such as the Permian–Triassic extinction event (250 million years ago, Ma) and Cretaceous–Paleogene extinction event (66 Ma). During the Permian-Triassic extinction, the largest extinction event in Earth's history, the global sea level fell 250 m (820 ft).

A major regression could cause marine organisms in shallow seas to go extinct, but mass extinctions tend to involve both terrestrial and aquatic species, and it is harder to see how a marine regression could cause widespread extinctions of land animals. Regressions are, therefore, seen as correlates or symptoms of major extinctions, rather than primary causes. The Permian regression might have been related to the formation of Pangaea. The accumulation of all major landmasses into one body could have facilitated a regression by providing "a slight enlargement of the ocean basins as the great continents coalesced." However, that cause could not have applied in all or even many of the other cases.

== Ice ages ==
During the ice ages of the Pleistocene, a clear correlation existed between marine regressions and episodes of glaciation. As the balance shifts between the global cryosphere and hydrosphere, more of the planet's water in ice sheets means less in the oceans. At the height of the last ice age, around 18,000 years ago, the global sea level was 120 to 130 m (390-425 ft) lower than today. A cold spell around 6 million years ago was linked to an advance in glaciation, a marine regression, and the start of the Messinian salinity crisis in the Mediterranean basin. Some major regressions of the past, however, seem unrelated to glaciation episodes, with the regression that accompanied the mass extinction at the end of the Cretaceous being one example.

== See also ==
- 8.2-kiloyear event – Rapid global cooling about 8,200 years ago
- Marine terrace – Emergent coastal landform
