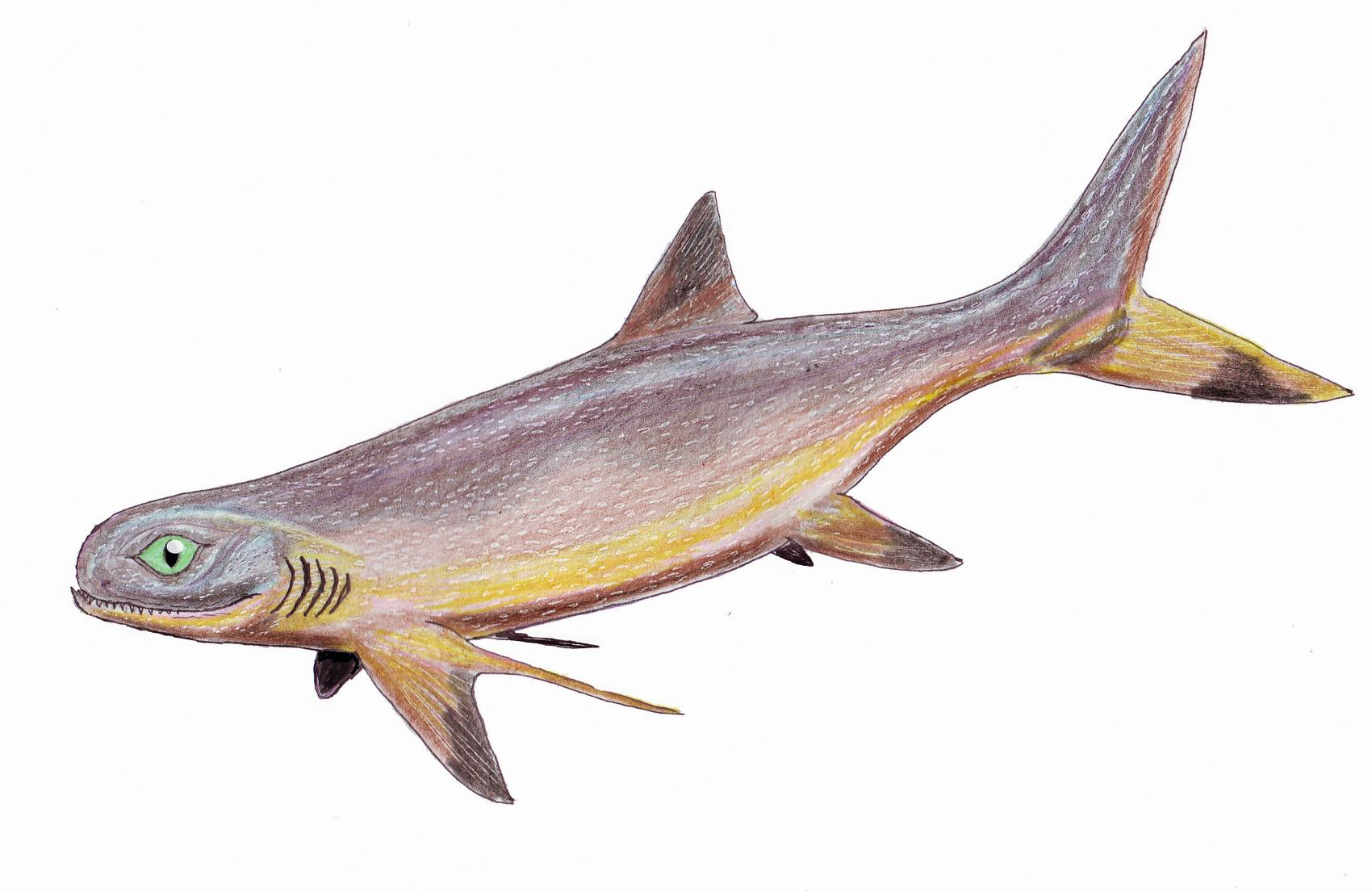
- Symmorium.

Scientific classification
- Kingdom: Animalia
- Phylum: Chordata
- Class: Chondrichthyes
- Order: †Symmoriiformes
- Family: †Symmoriidae; Dean, 1909

Genera
- Cobelodus; Crioselache; Denaea; Petrodus; Symmorium

= Symmoriidae =

Symmoriidae Temporal range: Devonian to Carboniferous, Famennian–Moscovian

Extinct family of cartilaginous fishes

Symmoriidae is an extinct family of cartilaginous fish belonging to the order Symmoriiformes. Members of the family are known from the Devonian and Carboniferous periods.
