= Overstep =

An overstep is a geological form that has a deposition of a stratum across inclined, progressively older rocks.

The Indira Gandhi National Open University syllabus definition is: "The term overstep is used to describe the relationship of beds in an unconformable sequence where the younger series rests upon progressively older members of the underlying series."

An onlap is a more general term than overstep, in which the younger beds overlap onto successively older beds.
