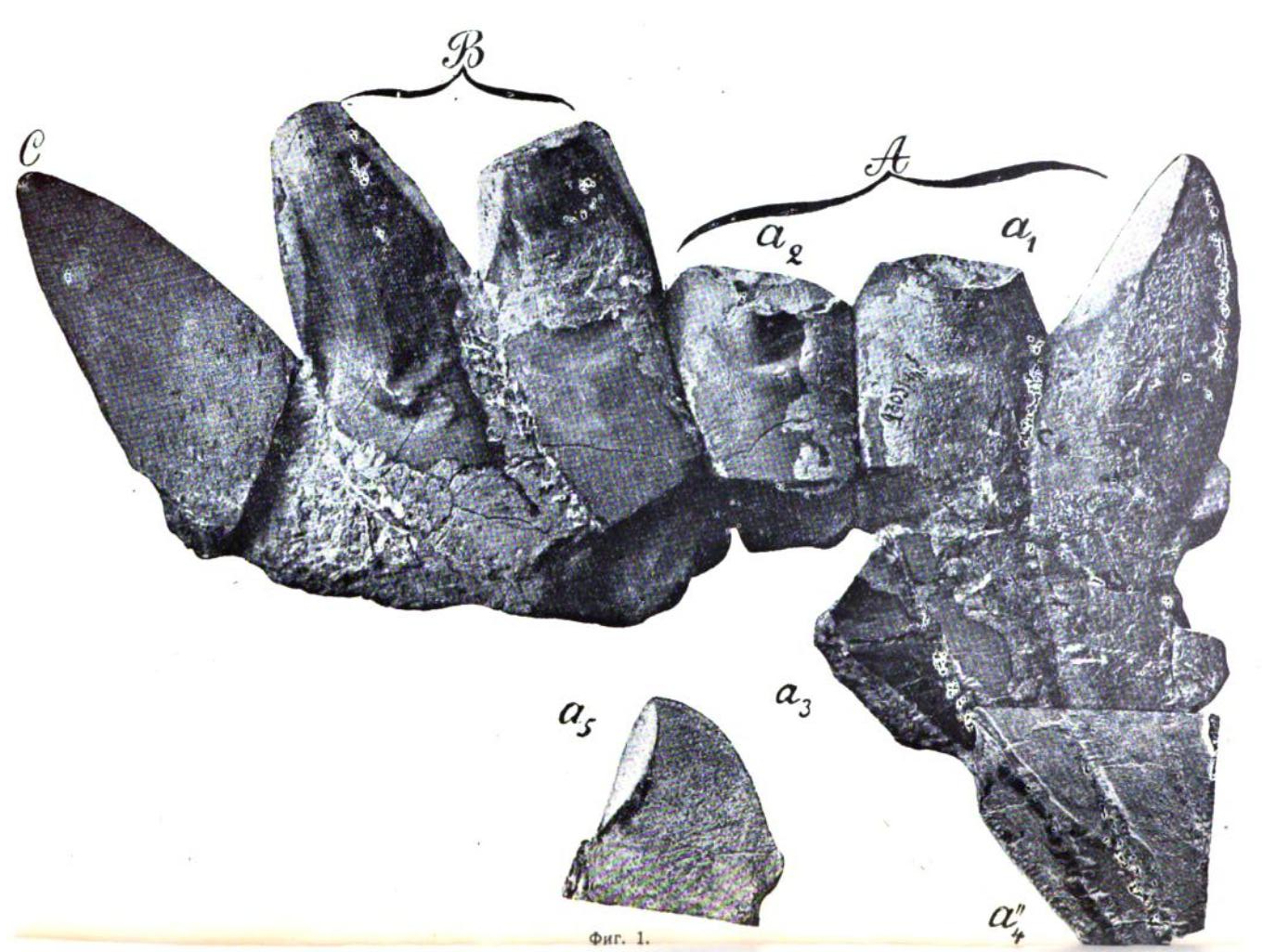
- The holotype specimen of P. clerci

Scientific classification
- Kingdom: Animalia
- Phylum: Chordata
- Class: Chondrichthyes
- Subclass: Holocephali
- Order: †Eugeneodontiformes
- Family: †Helicoprionidae
- Genus: †Parahelicoprion; Karpinsky, 1924

Type species
- Helicoprion clerci Karpinsky, 1916

Other species
- P. mariosuarezi Merino-Rodo & Janvier, 1986

Synonyms
- Helicoprion? (Karpinsky, 1899); Xystracanthus grandis? (Moore, 1929); Physonemus mirabilis? (St. John & Worthen, 1875)

= Parahelicoprion =

Parahelicoprion Temporal range: Early Permian Asselian–Artinskian

Extinct genus of cartilaginous fish

Parahelicoprion is an extinct genus of cartilaginous fish that lived during the Early Permian. The genus contains two species: P. clerci from the Arta Beds of the Ural Mountains of Russia, and P. mariosuarezi from the Copacabana Formation of Bolivia. Members of the genus possessed a row of large tooth crowns on the midline of the lower jaw, known as a tooth whorl. The characteristics of this whorl are unique to fishes of the order Eugeneodontiformes, and more specifically the family Helicoprionidae to which Parahelicoprion belongs. The genus name refers to Helicoprion, another eugeneodont from the Ural Mountains that bore a similar tooth arrangement.

The holotype of Parahelicoprion clerci, which consists only of tooth fragments, was badly damaged by mining and is broken into several pieces. That of the Bolivian P. mariosuarezi consists of nine partial teeth, the outer edges of which are broken off. Estimates of the extent of the complete whorl, body size, and ecology of Parahelicoprion are speculative as a result of its incomplete fossils, although it is assumed to have been very large, predatory, and potentially pelagic. When first described, P. clerci was considered a species of Helicoprion, although its initial describer, Alexander Karpinsky, later separated it into its own genus. It has since been suggested that this genus may indeed represent a junior synonym of Helicoprion or a paraphyletic, non-diagnostic taxon.

== Discovery and naming ==
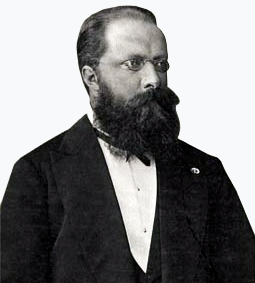
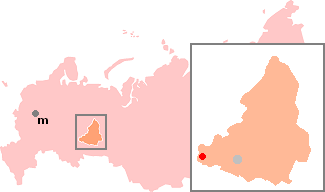
Photograph of Onésime Clerc, for whom the species P. clerci is named (left), and the location of Krasnoufimsk, where the known remains of the species originated (right)

The type specimen of Parahelicoprion clerci was found in the Ural Mountains region of Russia, in strata dated to the Artinskian stage of the Cisuralian (early Permian) epoch. The fossil was embedded in a matrix of very fine-grain marlstone, and although it is well-preserved it is broken into multiple fragments. The first five portions of the specimen to be found, which consist of several teeth, were discovered incidentally by a miner and were badly damaged as a result poor handling during collection. Additional fragments of the holotype were identified in the years following the taxon's description, all in similar condition and found within one square meter of the first find. These remains include a single partial tooth described in 1925 and a collection of three partial teeth purchased by Georgii Fredriks and realized to correspond with the same fossil in 1926. Several fragments of the tooth whorl were sold to private collectors and were never scientifically examined. Pieces of a large dorsal fin spine found at the same site have also been suggested to have come from the same individual as the teeth. The rocks which produced the holotype specimen have, since its discovery, been defined as part of the Divya Formation (alternatively spelled the Divjinskian Formation). The exposure of the Divya Formation where the type specimen was found is near the town of Krasnoufimsk, and as of 1976 a cast of the P. clerci holotype was housed at the Krasnoufimsk Museum. The species is known only from the damaged holotype.

The type specimen of Parahelicoprion was initially named Helicoprion clerci by the Russian geologist Alexander Karpinsky in 1916. Karpinsky reassigned Helicoprion clerci to its own genus in a work published in 1924, although he had informally referred to it as Parahelicoprion in a series of publications two years prior and had suggested it may warrant its own genus when he first named the species. The given genus name derives from that of the related Helicoprion, meaning 'coiled saw' or 'spiral saw', although due to the assumed shape of P. clerci's tooth whorl Karpinsky considered this name technically unfitting. The species name, P. clerci, honors Onésime Clerc, who at the time of its description was the president of the Ural Society of Natural Science Lovers. Clerc was responsible for bringing the holotype specimen of P. clerci to Karpinsky's attention.

A second species, Parahelicoprion mariosuarezi, was described and tentatively assigned to the genus in 1986 by Dagmar Merino-Roda and Philippe Janvier. This species, which is also based only on its type specimen (designated no. 6097, YPFB), was discovered in the Copacabana Formation of Yaurichambi, Bolivia, and was dated to the Asselian stage of the early Permian. The holotype, a partial set of teeth, was found preserved in a layer of calcarious red sandstone. The species is named in honor of Dr. Mario Suarez-Riglos, and the type specimen is currently housed in the collection of the Noel Kempff Mercado Natural History Museum.

== Description ==
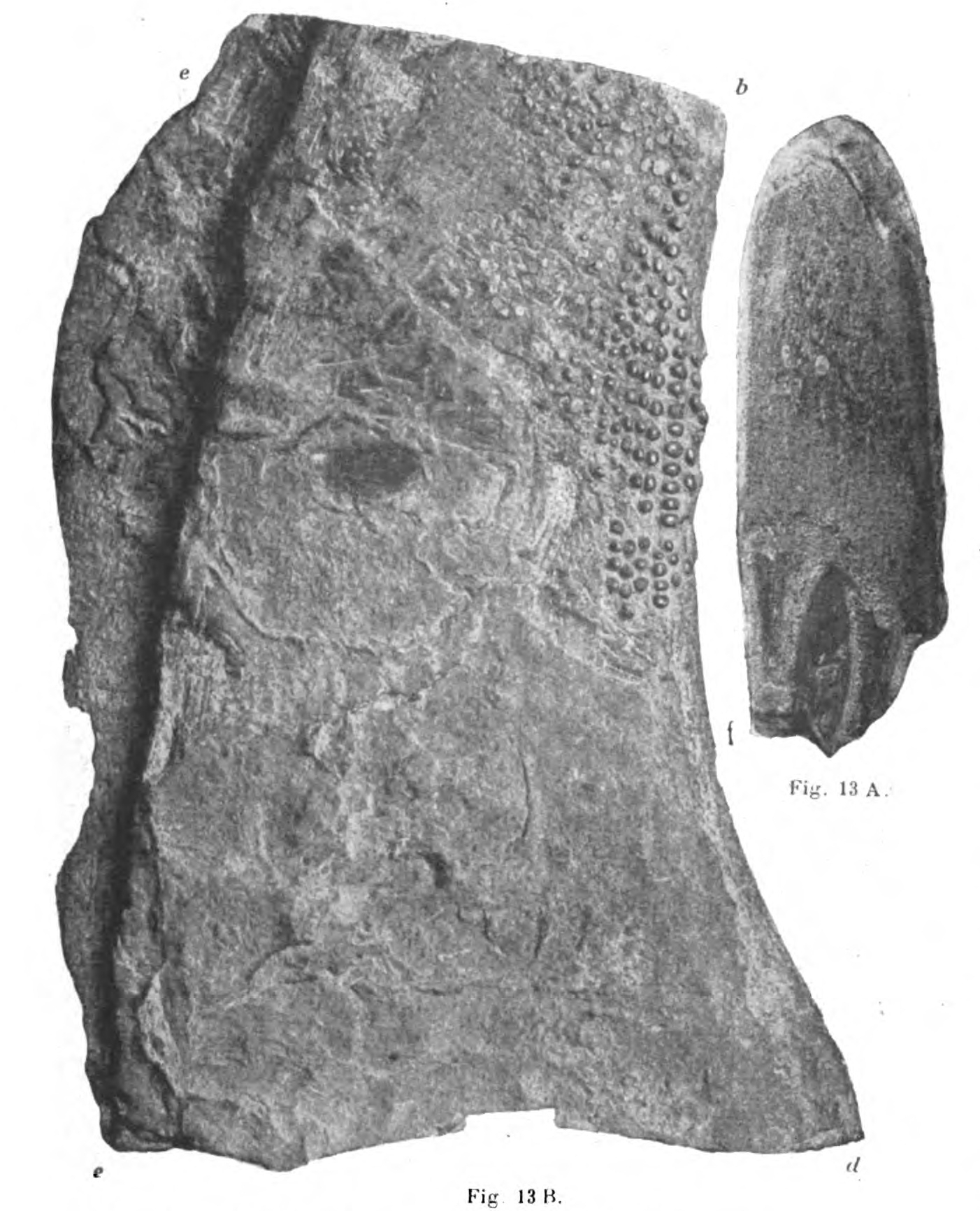
Fragments of the large spine-like organ which Karpinsky assigned to P. clerci. This specimen has since been recognized as belonging to the form-genera Physonemus or Xystracanthus

Both Parahelicoprion species are very incompletely known, and the only material which has been assigned confidently to the genus consists of fragments of a row of teeth termed a tooth whorl. While some authors have suggested the genus lacks defining, autapomorphous features, the tooth crowns of both species of Parahelicoprion are noted to share extremely long, backwards-sweeping, recessed lower sections (referred to as "wings" or "ribs" by researchers) which extend nearly to the base of the tooth root, as well as curved denticles or serrations along the edges of these sections. In addition to tooth whorls, it has been suggested that large, forward-arching fin spines under the form-genus Physonemus (also classified as Xystracanthus) may have belonged to Parahelicoprion and related eugeneodonts, with a fossil of Xystracanthus grandis or its potential synonym Physonemus mirabilis suggested to correspond to Parahelicoprion clerci. In a 2018 publication, researcher Serge Naugholnykh asserted personal belief that these spines correspond to edestoids, although sickle-like spine fossils are believed by other researchers to represent the copulatory organs of symmoriiform fishes or, alternatively, of holocephalans. Members of the order Eugeneodontiformes, which includes Parahelicoprion, are typically characterized as having lacked fin spines.

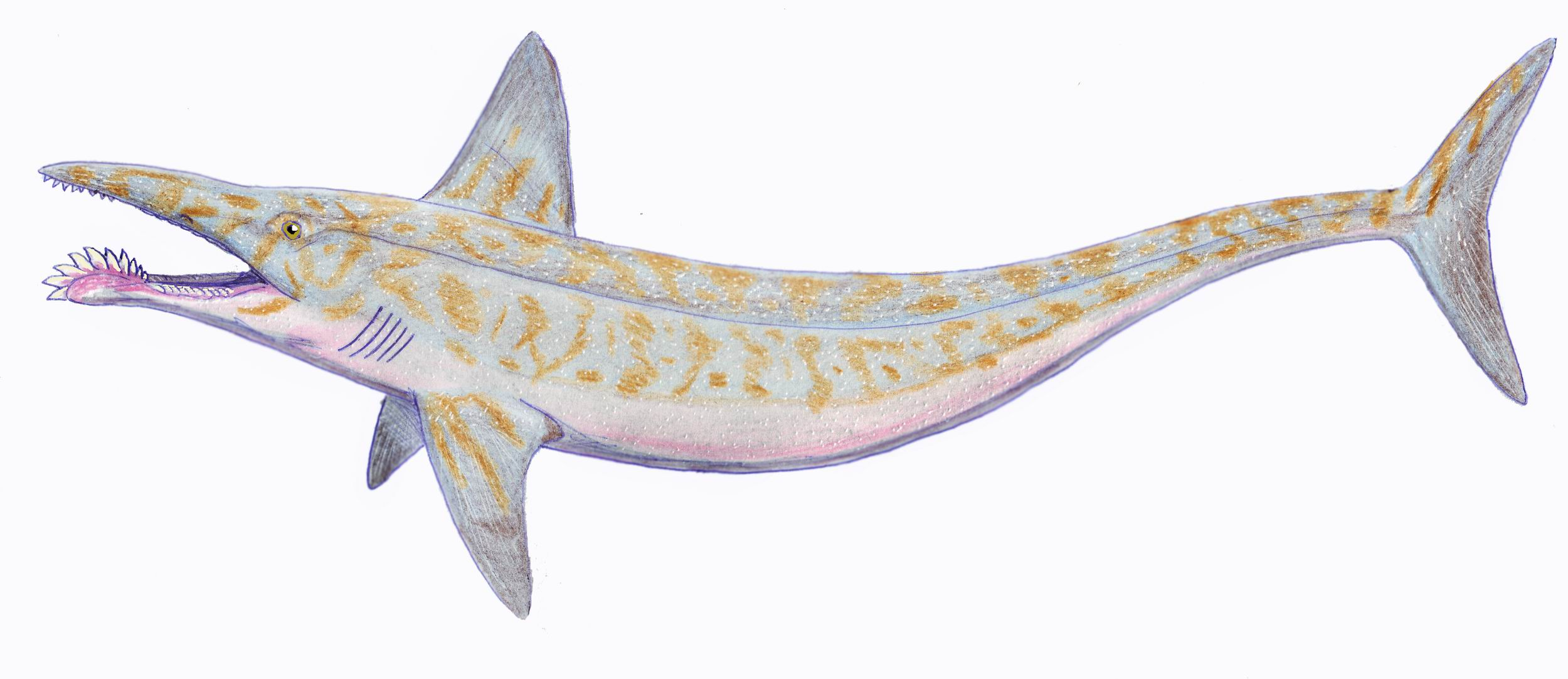
Speculative life reconstruction of Parahelicoprion clerci, similar to that proposed for P. mariosuarezi in its 1986 description and illustrated in Philippe Janvier's textbook Early Vertebrates (1996)

In life, the tooth whorl of Parahelicoprion was positioned symphyseally (along the midline) in the lower jaw. In his 1916 description of P. clerci (as Helicoprion clerci), Karpinsky assumed the whorl of the species formed a very large spiral, and Naugholnykh has subsequently agreed that the shape of the complete whorl would have been indistinguishable from that of Helicoprion. In a 1924 publication, however, Karpinsky calculated that the complete whorl of P. clerci likely consisted of no more than 20 tooth crowns and did not form a spiral, although the precise number of tooth crowns is unknown. The description of P. mariosuarezi suggests that it likely possessed a very short tooth whorl situated at the tip of a greatly elongated pair of jaws, based on both the partial skull of Sarcoprion edax and the well-preserved fossils of the related caseodonts. Various other authors have agreed with a Sarcoprion-like interpretation, but have acknowledged that the shape of the complete whorl is not known and that the material is too fragmentary for such comparisons to be confidently made. The postcranial anatomy of eugeneodonts has been suggested to vary little between genera, indicating that, like their smaller, better known relatives, both species of Parahelicoprion possessed long, fusiform bodies with crescent-shaped caudal fins, and that they lacked pelvic and anal fins.

=== Parahelicoprion clerci ===
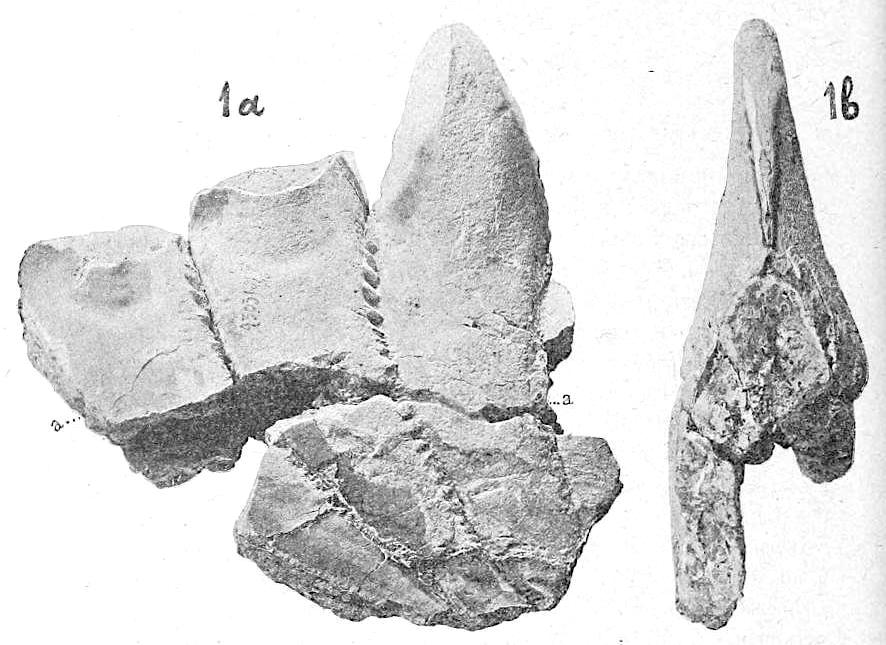
Three re-assembled crowns of the type specimen of P. clerci, photographed in lateral (1a) and transverse (1b) views

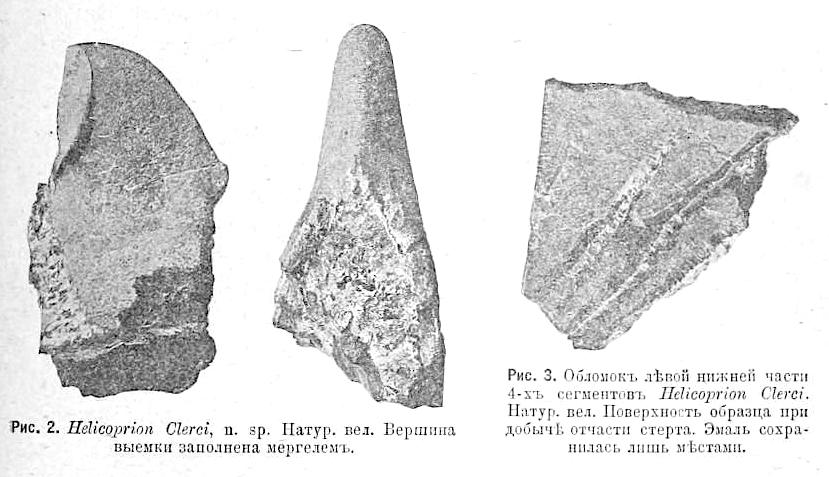
Additional fragments of the P. clerci holotype, including the presumed foremost tooth crown (fig. 2)

The known remains of Parahelicoprion clerci consist of badly damaged tooth fragments, all belonging to a single tooth whorl. During preparation by Karpinsky in 1916, three of these fragments were glued together in order to reflect their in-life articulation, and by 1926 these had again been assembled with additional associated material. The holotype specimen as recognized today spans 25 cm (10 in) in profile view and consists of six articulated tooth crowns, as well as an associated smaller tooth fragment. The surface texture of the teeth has been badly damaged by mining, and Karpinsky considered it likely that parts of the fossil had been destroyed or never collected. No other teeth are confidently associated with this species, although crushing teeth similar to those of Campodus or Orodus may have been present.

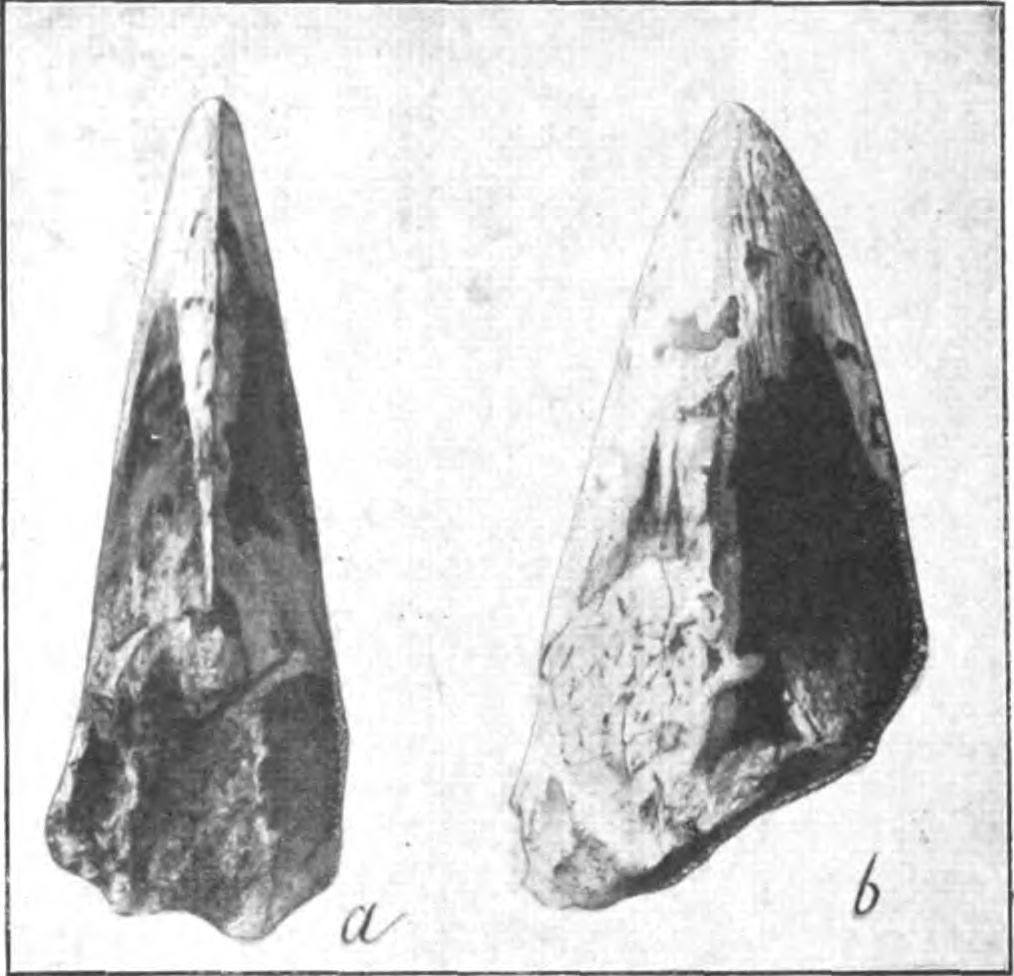
Illustration of the rearmost known crown tip of P. clerci in transverse (a) and lateral (b) views

The teeth increase significantly in size towards the rear of the whorl, with the largest tooth crown tip (not including the serrated "rib") of the holotype measuring 3.4 cm (1.3 in) in height, 3 cm (1.2 in) across, and 1.9 cm (0.75 in) wide at the widest point, while the smallest known tip measures 2.4 cm (0.94 in) in height, 2.9 cm (1.1 in) across and 1.5 cm (0.59 in) in width. The morphology of the teeth also change depending on their position, with the teeth farthest forward being rounder and more asymmetrical than those at the back, which are nearly completely symmetrical in profile. The rear edges of the frontmost crown's tips thin to form sharp cutting blades, which are not serrated. In the rear crown tips, both the front and rear edges of the tooth are blade-like. The upper tips of all the known tooth crowns are uniquely rounded and blunt, rather than tapering to a point like those of many other related edestoids. As in other members of its family, the teeth of the whorl angle forward in the mouth. The "ribs" or "wings" of the teeth curve towards the back of the jaws and are extremely elongated. They are lined with very deep, downward-angled serrations along their forward edges and crenulations or corrugations along the sloping rear edges, both of which are absent from the tips of the crowns. The form of these serrations and crenulations is unique to this species. The base (or root) of Parahelicoprion's whorl is described as entirely fused, with no gaps or separations between segments forming separate teeth.

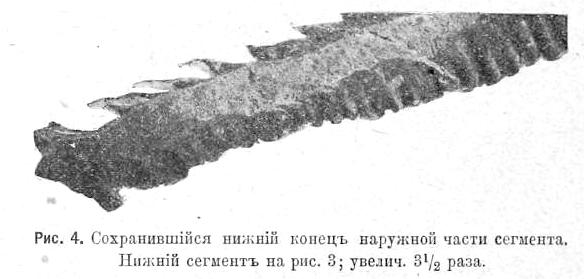
Tip of the "wing" or "rib" of the tooth of P. clerci, displaying this species' unique arrangement of serrations (above) and crenulations (below)

The histology of the holotype teeth is suggested to have originally been well-preserved, although on the exterior of the teeth the damage is severe enough to prevent study. The outer coating of the teeth, which is described by Karpinsky as being enamel, has been abraded away across most of the tooth fragments. This substance has alternatively been identified as enameloid (also called vitrodentine) in other helicoprionids and other fishes, rather than true enamel. The interior of the teeth remains well-preserved, and was composed of a spongy form of dentin identified by Karpinsky as vasodentin (a form common among fishes). Unlike other eugeneodonts, trabecular dentin (a porous form found in cartilaginous fish) was likely absent from the teeth. The interior structure of the known specimen could not be studied in detail, however, as Karpinsky did not want to damage the specimen through cross-sectioning.

=== Parahelicoprion mariosuarezi ===
The holotype whorl of Parahelicoprion mariosuarezi is larger than that of P. clerci. Merino-Rodo and Janvier (1986) state that it is likely nearly complete, with the exception of the tips of the teeth along the upper part of the whorl being broken off. Unlike the type species, serrations and crenulations are absent along most of the crown, and instead several large, pointed denticles protrude along the "wings" of the third to ninth tooth crowns. This species also preserves a single denticle-bearing parasymphyseal tooth (a paired tooth near the midline of the mouth) along the edge of the whorl, a tooth type which is not known from P. clerci. The holotype of P. mariosuarezi shows the smallest crown was positioned at the front of the preserved portion of the whorl and was significantly smaller than the next crown in the sequence. The whorl possesses only nine tooth crowns, far fewer than those of related genera such as Helicoprion. Despite being unpreserved, the outer cutting edges of the teeth in P. mariosuarezi are thought to have been similar to P. clerci, due to the preserved portions of the crowns being similar in shape and thickness. The rear portion of the whorl is described as being fused.

=== Estimated length ===
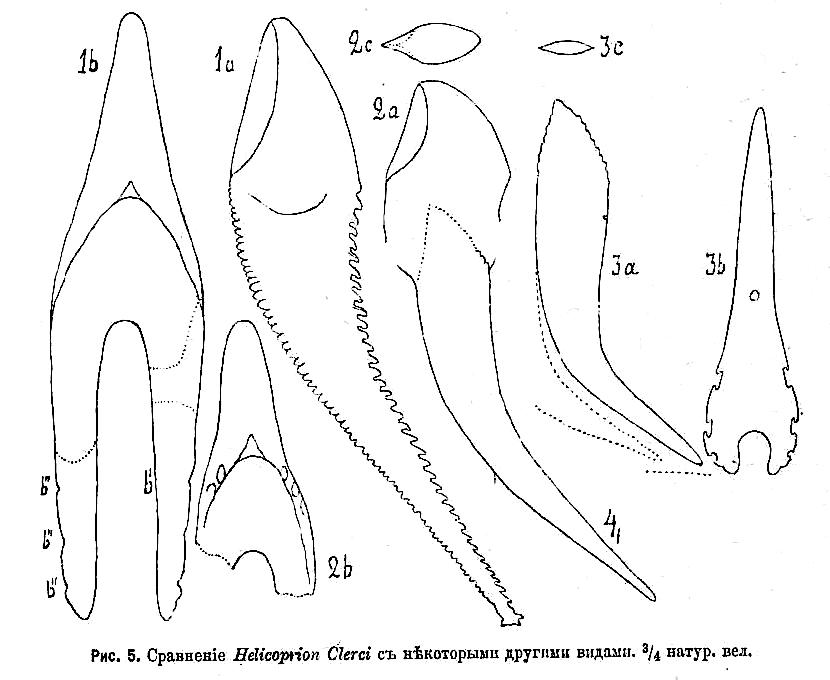
Reconstructed teeth of P. clerci in lateral (1a, 2a), transverse (1b, 2b), and superior (2c) views, compared with the teeth of Helicoprion bessonowi (3a, 3b, 3c). Drawn to scale

While the known tooth crowns of the genus are considered to be among the largest of the eugeneodonts, estimates of Parahelicoprion's total body size have been considered controversial. Karpinsky himself did not provide body length estimates in his descriptions, but did note that the tooth crowns of Parahelicoprion clerci were significantly larger than those of any then-known Helicoprion specimens and suggested that the animal must have been very large to accommodate them. Philippe Janvier refers to the potentially even larger Parahelicoprion mariosuarezi as "huge" in his 1996 book Early Vertebrates, and in Doug Perrine's 1999 book Sharks and Rays it is stated that Parahelicoprion "... might have been over 100 ft (30 m) in lengths – perhaps the largest fish of all time", based on an estimate proposed by paleontologist Richard Lund. A similar length was suggested by author and illustrator Richard Ellis in his 2003 book Aquagenesis: The Origin and Evolution of Life in the Sea. Ellis states that, in spite of the fragmentary nature of the known material, "... unless it [Parahelicoprion] was an animal with a gigantic head or outlandishly oversized teeth, it had to have been a monster, at least 100 feet long and maybe more." This conclusion was reached based on comparisons between the height of the teeth in Otodus megalodon, which the teeth of Parahelicoprion are said to exceed in size. Lengths of 11–13 meters (36–43 ft) have more recently been suggested for Parahelicoprion by online sources, although these numbers originate from non-academic amateur researchers and are not supported by scientific literature.

Paleontologist Oleg Lebedev estimated in a 2009 publication that the closely related Helicoprion bessonowi may have been between 5–8 meters (16–26 ft) in total body length; a measurement based on assumptions about its head-to-whorl proportions in comparison with the related caseodonts. A later study has proposed a most plausible total length of up to 7 meters (23 ft) for both Helicoprion and Parahelicoprion based on this methodology, and suggested that previous overestimations of Parahelicoprion's size were the result of assuming that the fossils were very small fragments of a Helicoprion-like spiral, rather than being nearly complete. Due to the fragmentary nature of the known material, it has been considered unreasonable by some researchers to give precise total length estimates for Helicoprion, Parahelicoprion, or any other members of Edestoidea. Though their exact maximum sizes are not known, edestoids were likely among the largest cartilaginous fish of the Paleozoic era.

== Classification ==
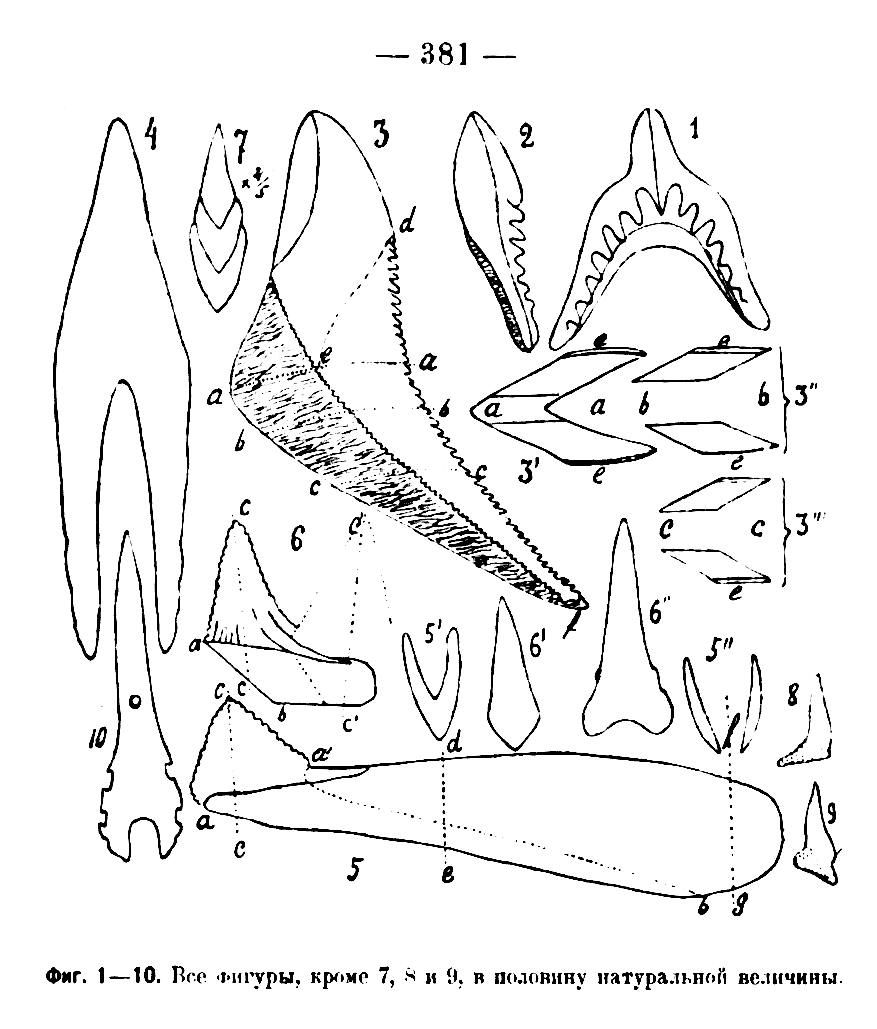
Whorl segments of Parahelicoprion clerci illustrated in lateral (3) and transverse (4) views, compared with those of the related eugeneodonts Campodus (Agassizodus?), Helicoprion, and Edestus

When first named, Parahelicoprion was considered a member of the family Edestidae, which at that time also encompassed genera such as Helicoprion and Campodus. While the relation and classification of edestids and helicoprionids was variable throughout the 20th century, Parahelicoprion is today considered to be a member of the family Helicoprionidae within the order Eugeneodontiformes (alternately spelled Eugeneodontida), which is itself a member of the subclass Holocephali or Euchondrocephali. The helicoprionids (also called agassizodontids by some authors) are defined by possessing tooth whorls with forward angled, blade-like tooth crowns and, in many genera, tooth roots which are completely fused. Members of the group also possessed laterally positioned flattened crushing teeth. Other aspects of the group's jaws and skulls are only rarely preserved, and nothing is known of their bodies.

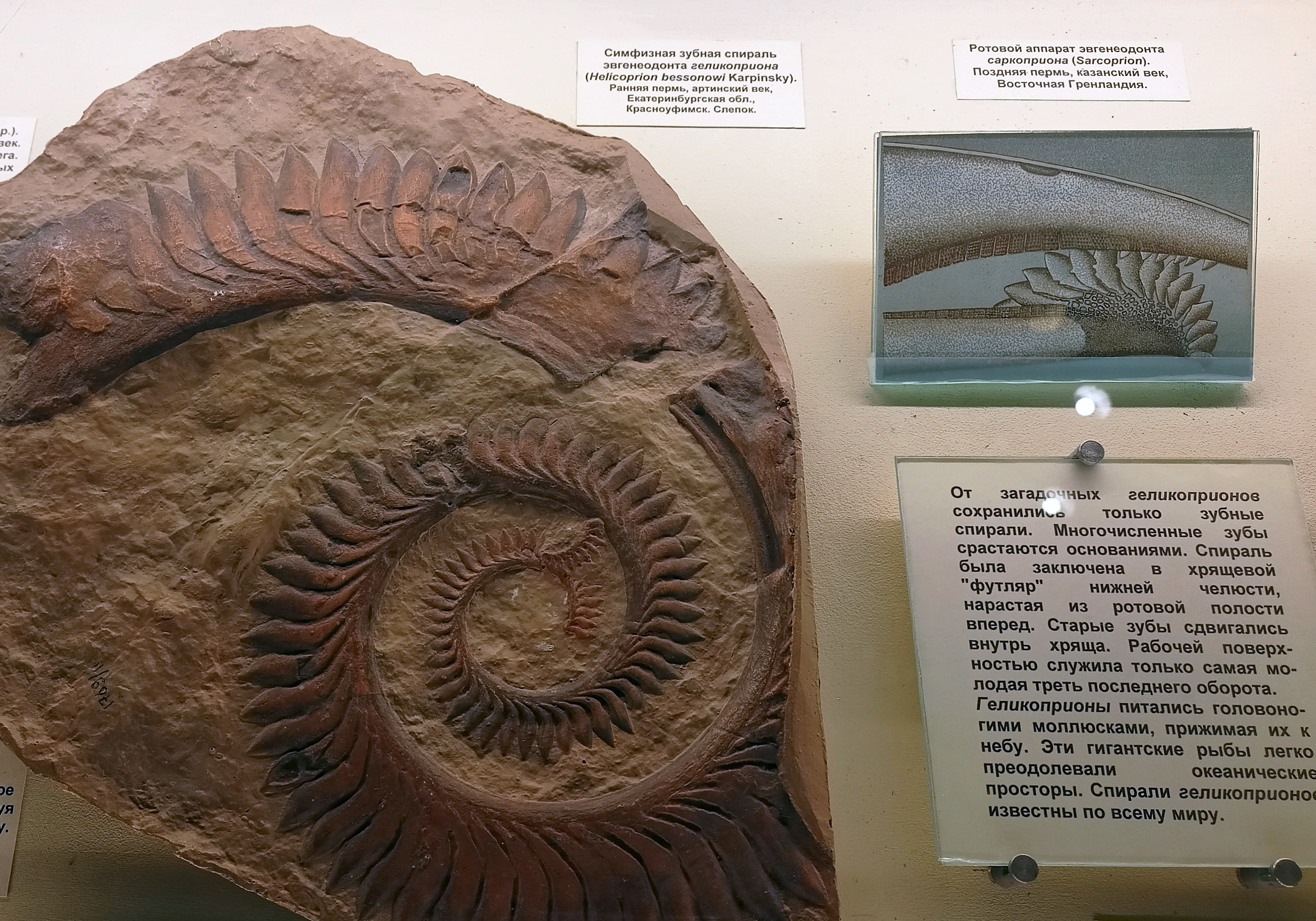
The whorls of the related Helicoprion bessonowi (left) and Sarcoprion edax (right) displayed at the Moscow Paleontological museum

In a 1925 publication, Karpinsky suggested that P. clerci may represent a directly intermediate, transitional form between the genus Campodus and the more derived Helicoprion, a conclusion agreed with by Egil Nielsen in his 1952 description of Sarcoprion and Parahelicampodus. Svend Erik Bendix-Almgreem, in a 1976 paper, suggested that Parahelicoprion may have been part of a radiation of whorl-toothed cartilaginous fish unrelated to the helicoprionids and edestids. This lineage was proposed to also consist of Erikodus, Fadenia, and Sarcoprion, with P. clerci considered a possible member due to similarities with the latter taxon. In 1981, Rainer Zangerl considered Parahelicoprion to be the sister taxon to Campyloprion in his morphological analysis of all (then known) members of the newly proposed order Eugeneodontiformes, which united the edestids, helicoprionids, and the caseodonts. Following Zangerl's analysis, paleontologists Dagmar Merino-Rodo and Philippe Janvier concluded in their 1986 description of P. mariosuarezi that the genus Parahelicoprion may lack autapomorphic (derived) characteristics, which puts its status as a monophyletic group into question and complicates the matter of assigning new species. In a 2018 paper, paleontologist Serge Naugholnykh proposed that P. clerci simply represents an especially large individual of Helicoprion and that the two genera are synonymous, although subsequent papers have continued to recognize Parahelicoprion as a valid genus of helicoprionid eugeneodont.

== Paleobiology and paleoecology ==
Parahelicoprion was a carnivore that inhabited marine environments. It has been suggested to have been the apex predator of its ecosystem, with the serrated tooth whorl being adapted for cutting prey. While multiple feeding styles are thought to have been present among different genera of edestoids, it has been hypothesized that members of the Helicoprionidae were molluscivorous and fed primarily on ammonoid and coleoid cephalopods, with smaller cartilaginous fish potentially constituting a portion of their diet as well.

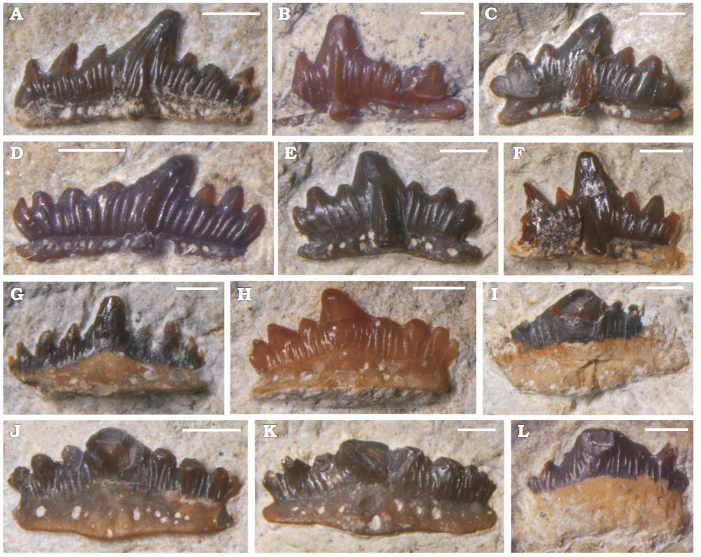
The teeth of Artiodus prominens, a euselachian stem-group shark known from the Arta Beds of Krasnoufimsk

The Artinskian deposits of Krasnoufimsk, also called the Arta Beds, were deposited in a shallow sea basin between the Boreal and Tethys oceans. These fossil beds are made up of the lower (older) Divya Formation and the upper (younger) Sarginskian Formation, and are composed predominantly of marls and limestones. During the early Permian, reef habitats made up of crinoids, sponges, bryozoans and rugose corals were present, which were inhabited by a diverse assemblage of trilobites, goniatite and nautiloid cephalopods, and fishes. In addition to Parahelicoprion clerci, the Divya Formation yields a large variety of chondrichthyan fossils, including the remains of euselachian sharks, hybodonts, petalodonts, cochliodonts and cladodonts. The similar helicoprionid Helicoprion bessonowi is also known from numerous tooth whorls collected in the Divya Formation. Fossilized teeth collected from the Divya Formation show no indication of post-mortem wear, indicating calm waters.

The Copacabana Formation represented a shallow marine habitat, somewhat older than the Arta Beds and dated to the boundary between the Carboniferous and the Permian. Of the formation's two strata which preserve fish fossils, Parahelicoprion is known only from the upper (younger) layer, while the majority of observed species come from a slightly older layer below it. Among these species, actinopterygians (ray-finned fish) and holocephalans have been identified. The known fossils of holocephalans include remains of a large petalodont similar to Megactenopetalus as well as the tooth-plates of cartilaginous fishes similar to Lagarodus or Helodus. Teeth and scales belonging to bony fish in the family Platysomidae are also known, and isolated teeth suggest that cladodont sharks (Identified by Merino-Rodo and Janvier as Cladodus) were also present in the environment. The teeth of jawless, fish-like vertebrates called conodonts are abundant, and it is from these index fossils that the age of the formation has been determined. Marine invertebrates have also been found at the site, and include bivalves, brachiopods, trilobites, crinoids and bryozoans. While lower fish-bearing strata of the Copacabana Formation are believed to represent a benthic reef community, Merino-Rodo and Janvier suggest that the sandstones which compose the upper fish-bearing layer and which preserve the whorl of Parahelicoprion may have formed in an even shallower, intertidal habitat, and that the type of P. mariosuarezi represents the remains of an animal which stranded on the shore.

== Extinction ==
The latest known occurrence of the genus is the Artinskian stage of the Permian, and it is assumed to have been extinct by the end of the Cisuralian. Karpinsky has suggested that the disappearance of the seaway connecting the Arctic and Tethys oceans was directly responsible for the extinction of the Uralian edestoids. Although he does not suggest a specific cause of extinction elsewhere, he does suggests that the large size and extremely specialized dentition of the genus made it difficult for it to adapt to environmental change. Alongside Parahelicoprion, many other cartilaginous fish genera of the Divya Formation disappear from the fossil record at the close of the Artinskian stage.

== See also ==
- Largest prehistoric animals
- List of prehistoric cartilaginous fish genera
