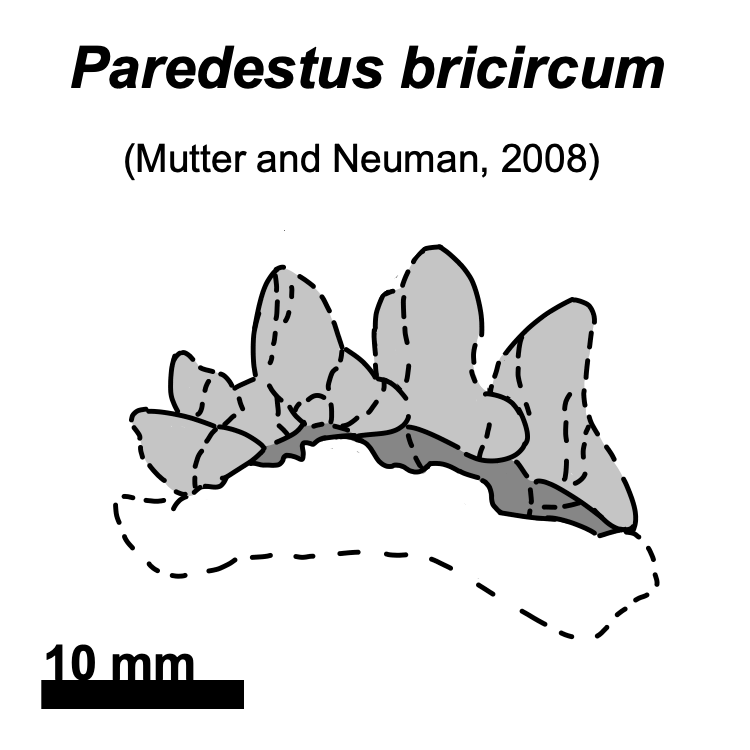
- Illustration of the lower symphyseal tooth whorl of the holotype. Missing or obscured portions of the crowns and root are represented by dashed lines

Scientific classification
- Kingdom: Animalia
- Phylum: Chordata
- Class: Chondrichthyes
- Subclass: Holocephali
- Order: †Eugeneodontiformes
- Clade: †Edestoidea
- Genus: †Paredestus; Mutter and Neuman, 2008
- Species: †P. bricircum

Binomial name
- †Paredestus bricircum Mutter and Neuman, 2008

= Paredestus =

Paredestus Temporal range: Triassic (Olenekian), 251.3–247.2 Ma

Extinct genus of cartilaginous fish

Paredestus (meaning "near Edestus") is a monotypic genus of extinct eugeneodont holocephalan from the Early Triassic of Canada. The type and only species, P. bricircum ('short wheel') represents the last known member of the superfamily Edestoidea and among the last known eugeneodonts. It was named in 2008 based on tooth and jaw material, with the holotype representing the only known specimen.

Paredestus is known from a partial skull preserving part of the lower symphyseal tooth whorl, remains of surrounding pavement teeth and what may represent additional large mesially positioned teeth, as well as dermal denticles and remains of the upper dentition. The tooth crowns of the whorl are described as decreasing in size anteriorly, with the largest of the broad, blade-like crowns sitting towards the back of the mouth. Weathering of the fossil makes it difficult to determine the precise anatomy of the teeth, but their appearance is most similar to that of edestids, which this genus may be a member of. Like other eugeneodontids, it was a marine predator.

== Description and classification ==
Paredestus is classified as a member of the superfamily Edestoidea, although the tooth anatomy of P. bricircum is wholly unique and highly divergent compared to late Paleozoic eugeneodonts. With the exception of a thin rod of preserved cartilage which may have been a visceral arch, the skeleton of P. bricercum is unknown. The upper tooth pavement is preserved, although there is no indication of the upper jaw itself. This structure may have been absent in life as is proposed in Sarcoprion, or it may simply be unpreserved as a result of the genus possessing a soft, uncalcified skeleton, a trait which has been suggested for edestoids more broadly. The single known specimen (designated UALVP 46579) was discovered in a concretion, and originated from the British Columbian Sulphur Mountain Formation.

=== Teeth and dermal denticles ===
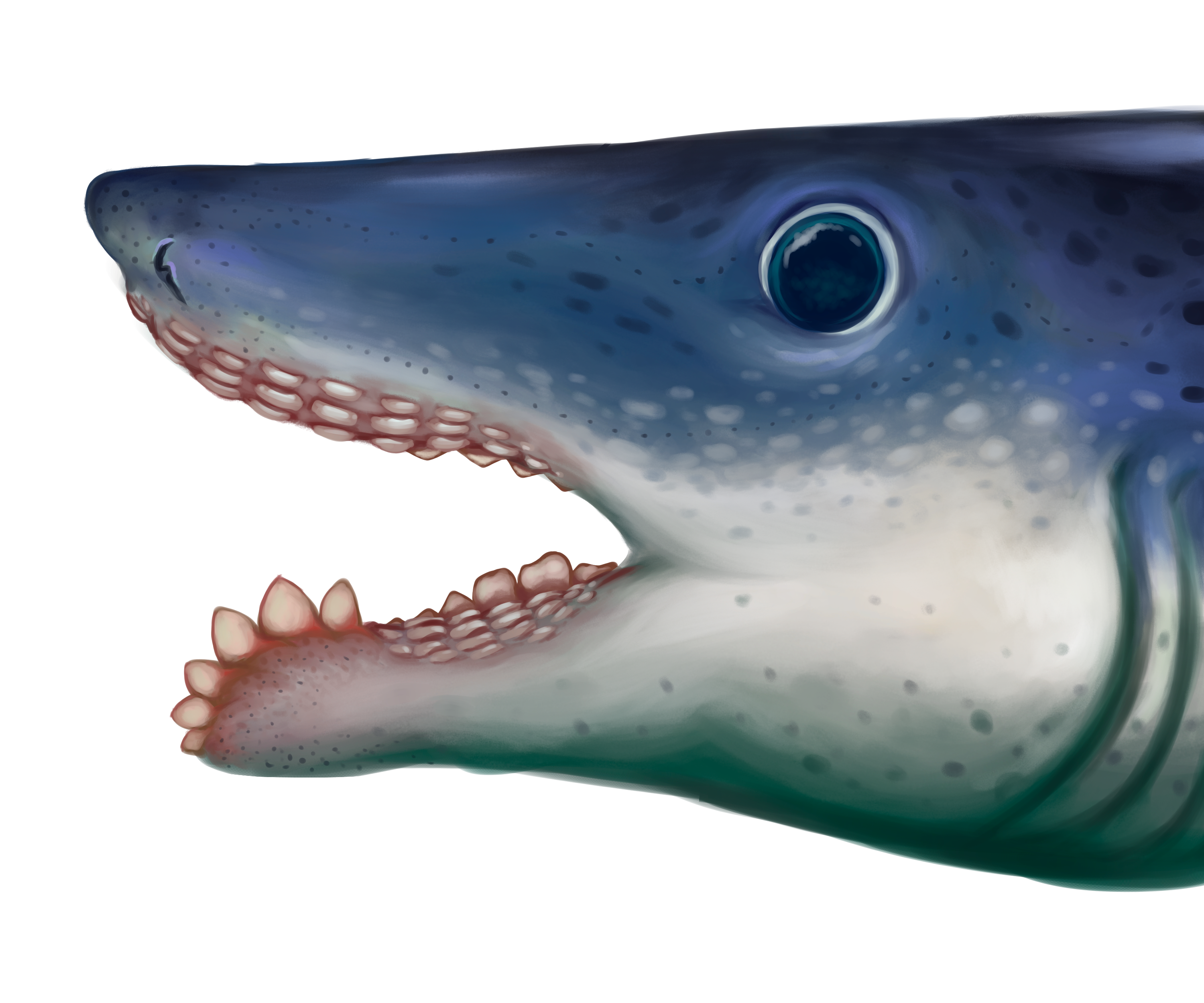
Life restoration of P. bricircum, based on the holotype dentition

The dentition of the P. bricircum holotype is partially articulated. The preserved section of a lower tooth whorl consists of a fragmentary root, about 3 cm (1.2 in) in length, with five tooth crowns of varying sizes protruding from it. The crowns increase greatly in size towards the posterior of the mouth, angle backwards, and may have been serrated, although the authors acknowledge that the edges of the fossilized tooth crowns are weathered. While the condition of the whorl itself is similar to that in other members of Edestoidea, the genus is most unique in possessing rows of large, well developed cutting teeth apparently mesio-laterally positioned in the jaw. Either an unpreserved upper jaw (palatoquadrate) or the chondrocranium supported rows of blunt, rectangular pavement teeth which contacted the whorl during feeding, as well as a single tooth which may be the remains of another upper row of cutting teeth.

An extensive patch of denticle shagreen is preserved in association with the teeth. Other eugeneodonts at the site are observed to be covered in a combination of backwards-facing, single-cusped denticles around the head, multicusped lepidomorial denticles across the body, and pharyngeal denticles preserved in the throats. The precise arrangement in P. bricircum is not known.

=== Classification ===
The reconstructed skull of the possible close relative Edestus heinrichi

While Mutter and Neuman propose Paredestus as a possible member of Edestidae, they acknowledge that such a classification is dubious and regard the genus as Edestoidea incertae sedis. The species is similar to edestids, namely Edestus vorax and Helicampodus, in the general shape of the tooth crowns. However, the large, well developed mesio-lateral teeth are unique to this taxon and suggest a more distant relation to known edestids. The known portion of the symphyseal lower whorl has vague similarities with Permian helicoprionids, although the authors consider the crown morphology too different to establish a confident relation. Sarcoprion edax, from Late Permian fossil deposits in Greenland, also possesses a similar arrangement of mesial and pavement teeth, but the morphology and orientation is highly distinct.

Paredestus is a member of the order Eugeneodontiformes (originally spelled Eugeneodontida) and of the subclass Holocephali. While often referred to in both informal and academic contexts as a shark, and historically having been considered part of Elasmobranchii, eugeneodonts are today thought to only be very distant relatives of sharks and evolutionarily closer to the modern chimaeras.

== Paleobiology and paleoecology ==
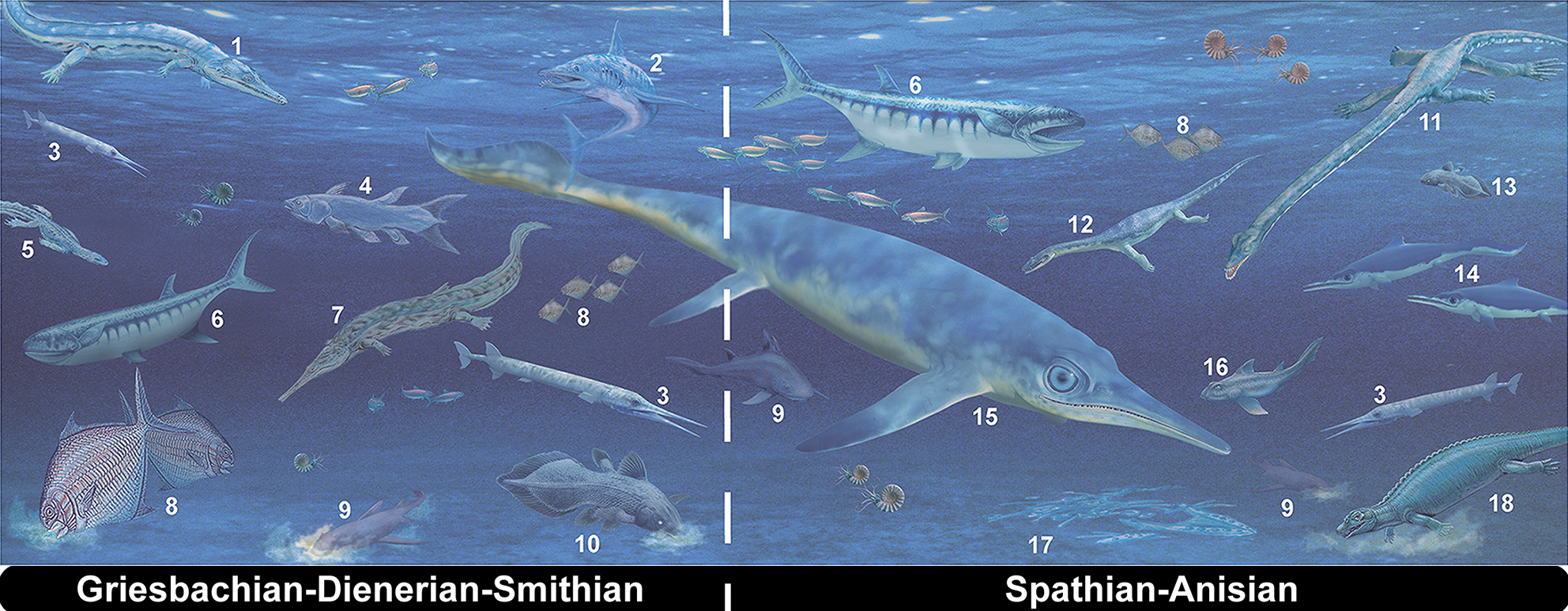
Contemporaneous vertebrate fauna of the Early-Middle Triassic of Canada. The Smithian-Spathian interval is equivalent to the Olenekian

The Wapiti Lake locality of the Sulphur Mountain Formation, where P. bricircum is known, represents a marine depositional environment dating to the Olenekian stage (Smithian-Spathian substages) of the Triassic Period, with sediments laid down between 251.3 and 247.2 million years ago based on conodont and ammonoid index fossils. This interval of the Triassic took place shortly after the extinction at the end of the Permian, and the fauna found at the Wapiti Lake site represent survivors of this event. Eugeneodont material is known from both the Smithian and Spathian substages, although the precise age of the P. bricircum holotype is not known due to it not being discovered in situ.

Along with Paredestus itself, a range of other eugeneodont taxa have been identified from Wapiti Lake, including at least one species of Fadenia and an unnamed rostrum-bearing caseodont previously classified as Caseodus. Hybodonts, coelacanths such as Rebellatrix, and bony fishes such as Helmolepis and Birgeria also likely coexisted with P. bricircum, as did the poorly-known chondrichthyan Listracanthus pectenatus. Other vertebrates known from the Lower Triassic Wapiti Lake deposits include ichthyosaurs and conodonts, while the known invertebrates consist primarily of mollusks, brachiopods and crustaceans. The faunal community of the site is broadly similar to that observed in contemporaneous deposits in Alberta and Greenland, indicating this roughly 1000 km (621 mile) region was environmentally consistent.

Despite representing the last known occurrence of the group, the Sulphur Mountain Formation eugeneodonts remain both relatively large bodied and diverse in spite of the Permian-Triassic extinction, comparably so to members of the group in the late Paleozoic. This is in contrast to other survivors, including other chondrichthyans, which decrease in size and diversity. As with other edestoids, P. bricircum was likely an active, nektonic predator. It is considered plausible that this species' diet was what allowed it to survive the Permian-Triassic boundary, but it is not known what this diet consisted of. With the exception of an Induan record of Sinohelicoprion qomolangama, Paredestus remains the only named Mesozoic edestoid, although an unnamed taxon formerly assigned to the dubious genus Edestodus has also been found at Sulphur Mountain.

== See also ==
List of prehistoric cartilaginous fish genera
