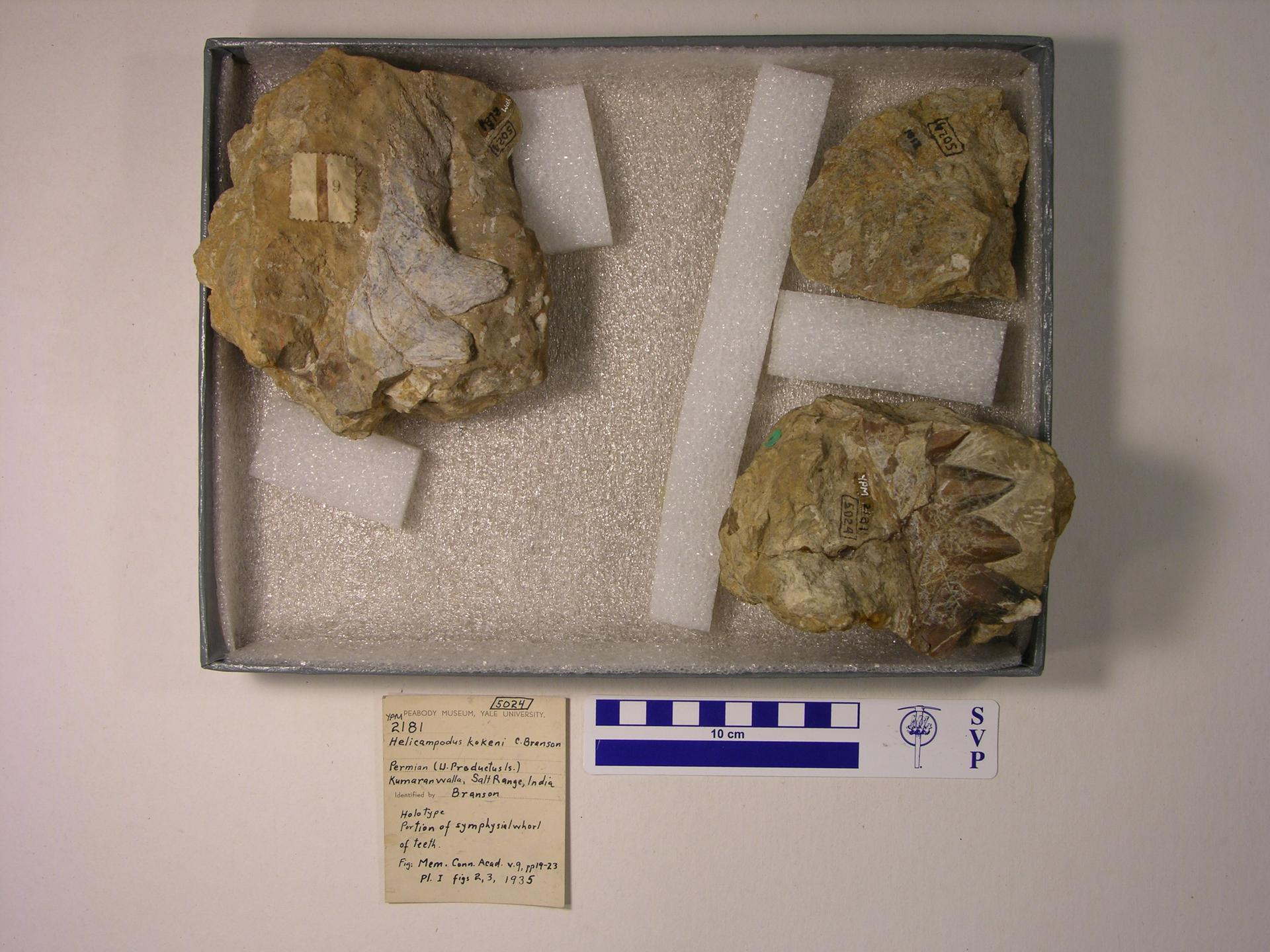
- Holotype specimen of H. kokeni

Scientific classification
- Kingdom: Animalia
- Phylum: Chordata
- Class: Chondrichthyes
- Order: †Eugeneodontiformes
- Family: †Helicampodontidae
- Genus: †Helicampodus; Branson, 1935

Species
- †Helicampodus egloni; †Helicampodus kokeni; †Helicampodus qomolangma?

= Helicampodus =

Helicampodus Temporal range: Late Permian - Early Triassic, 254–251.3 Ma

Extinct genus of cartilaginous fishes

Helicampodus is an extinct genus of shark-like eugeneodont fish that lived during the Late Permian to Early Triassic period. Fossils of Helicampodus have been found in Asia. The largest teeth of Helicampodus kokeni are about 2.7 cm in length, which points to a maximum size of around 2 m based on its relatives. It was earlier placed in the families Helicoprionidae and Edestidae, but has more recently been placed in Helicampodontidae.
