= Toxoprion =

Toxoprion Temporal range: 358–259 Ma Early Carboniferous to Late Permian

Scientific classification
- Kingdom: Animalia
- Phylum: Chordata
- Class: Chondrichthyes
- Subclass: Holocephali
- Order: †Eugeneodontida
- Family: †Helicoprionidae
- Genus: †Toxoprion; Hay, 1909

Type species
- Toxoprion lecontei Hay, 1909

Extinct genus of cartilaginous fishes

Toxoprion (Ancient Greek for "bow saw") is an extinct genus of eugeneodont holocephalans whose fossils are found in marine strata from the Early Carboniferous until the Late Permian near Eureka, Nevada.

== Description ==
Toxoprion was one of the many Carboniferous eugeneodonts which bore a palatoquadrate fused to its skull or reduced in other forms, and had its heavily serrated teeth grow outwards on the symphysis of the lower jaw similar to a rounded saw. Despite its jaw showing similarities to another eugeneodont, Helicoprion, the tooth row of Toxoprion does not coil back on itself, as seen in Helicoprion, but instead forms a downward curved tooth whorl similar to Campyloprion, Lestrodus, and Edestus. As in most members of eugeneodontida, the smaller teeth found near the anterior end of the whorl represent the oldest teeth, which the animal grew as a juvenile and the larger and younger teeth found near the back of the whorl represent teeth grown in adulthood. An interesting distinction of Toxoprion are that its older anterior teeth typically appear more rounded than the younger and sharper teeth near the back of its whorl. This may represent damage from feeding or may signify a change in diet and/or feeding strategy with age.

== Taxonomy ==
The genus acquired its name from the Greek word τόξο (tóxo), from the bow-shaped jaw on which the teeth of the creature were arranged, and πριόνι (prióni), for the number of triangular serrated teeth it had. While originally suggested to be a member of the genus Helicoprion, it was later shown to be a distinct animal. The genus contains one species, T. lecontei.
