= Syntomodus =

Syntomodus Temporal range: Permian Lopingian

Scientific classification
- Kingdom: Animalia
- Phylum: Chordata
- Class: Chondrichthyes
- Subclass: Holocephali
- Order: †Eugeneodontiformes
- Family: †Edestidae
- Genus: †Syntomodus
- Species: †S. abbreviatus

Binomial name
- †Syntomodus abbreviatus Obruchev, 1964

Synonyms
- Syntomotus abbreviatus Ginter et al. 2010

Extinct genus of cartilaginous fish

Syntomodus is an extinct genus of eugeneodont from the Late Permian of Russia. The genus includes a single species, S. abbreviatus, which is known only from a single, poorly preserved set of four teeth. The species may belong to the family Edestidae.

== Discovery ==
The holotype specimen of Syntomodus was discovered in a Lopingian-stage deposit in the Yana River Basin of Sakha Republic, Russia. The taxon was named and described by researcher Dmitry Vladimirovich Obruchev. The holotype (and only specimen) is part of the collection of the Palaeontological Institute in Moscow.

== Description ==
The only known specimen of Syntomodus is incomplete and has been described as poorly preserved. The teeth are triangular and blade-like, and because of their state of preservation it is unclear if they are angled forwards or backwards. In life they were positioned along the midline, or symphysis, of the jaw.

== Classification ==
When first described by Obruchev, Syntomodus was placed in the family Helicoprionidae, within the order Bradyodonti and the subclass Holocephali. Syntomodus is now presumed to instead be a member of the family Edestidae, although because the direction its teeth were angled (a characteristic which distinguishes Edestidae and Helicoprionidae) is unclear, this assignment is tentative. In 1981 publication, researcher Rainer Zangerl proposed that Syntomodus is the most basal edestid if it is included in that family.
