= Arpagodus =

Arpagodus Temporal range: Pennsylvanian

Scientific classification
- Kingdom: Animalia
- Phylum: Chordata
- Class: Chondrichthyes
- Subclass: Holocephali
- Order: †Eugeneodontida
- Family: †Agassizodontidae
- Genus: †Arpagodus; St. John & Worthen, 1875

Extinct genus of cartilaginous fishes

Arpagodus is an extinct genus of eugeneodont fish from the Carboniferous period. It currently contains only the species A. rectangulus. It is known mainly from the Pennsylvanian subperiod, such as the early Pennsylvanian of Russia and the late Pennsylvanian of Raytown Limestone Formation of Kansas, USA.
