= Erikodus =

Erikodus Temporal range: Permian 260–254 Ma

Scientific classification
- Kingdom: Animalia
- Phylum: Chordata
- Class: Chondrichthyes
- Subclass: Holocephali
- Order: †Eugeneodontiformes
- Family: †Caseodontidae
- Genus: †Erikodus; Nielsen, 1952
- Species: †E. groenlandicus

Binomial name
- †Erikodus groenlandicus Nielsen, 1932

Synonyms
- Agassizodus groenlandicus Nielsen, 1932

Extinct genus of cartilaginous fish

Erikodus is an extinct genus of caseodontid eugeneodont from the Late Permian of Greenland. A single species, E. groenlandicus, is known, which was originally classified as a species of Agassizodus. The genus had a row of rounded, overlapping teeth along the midline (or symphysis) of both the upper and lower jaw, as well as rows of flat, plate-like, rectangular crushing teeth elsewhere in the mouth.

== Discovery and naming ==
Remains of the genus are known from the Guadalupian-age Foldiv Creek Formation of East Greenland. The type species, Erikodus groenlandicus, was originally named as a species of Agassizodus in 1932 by Danish paleontologist Egil Nielsen. Teeth referred to the genus Copodus were also described by Nielsen in 1932. In a 1952 publication, Nielsen recognized that the species was distinct from Agassizodus and classified it as a distinct genus, and also recognized that the remains assigned to Copodus were also teeth of the same animal. Nielsen named the genus in honor of Swedish paleontologist Erik Stensiö.

== Description ==
Erikodus is known from teeth, scales, and portions of its cartilaginous skeleton such as the braincase, gills, pectoral girdle and fins, although detailed descriptions have only been published for the teeth. Symphyseal (midline) tooth-whorls were present in both the upper and lower jaws, which were proportionally large and had rounded, unfused, tightly-packed tooth crowns. The anatomy of the lateral teeth which sat further back in the jaws was similar to that of the related genera Agassizodus and Caseodus. Erikodus' teeth were rugose and ornamented, and were composed of tubular dentin (a form common in holocephalan fishes) without an outer covering of enameloid. The palatoquadrates (upper jaws) were fused to the braincase.

== Classification ==
When first named by Nielsen, Erikodus was assigned to the family Edestidae. While some later authors, such as Svend Erik Bendix-Almgreen, have questioned the association between Erikodus and other "edestid" taxa, the genus is now widely considered a member of the order Eugeneodontiformes, which is equivalent in meaning to Edestidae as used by Nielsen. E. groenlandicus is placed in the family Caseodontidae, which are characterized as eugeneodonts with broad, flattened teeth forming their tooth-whorls.
