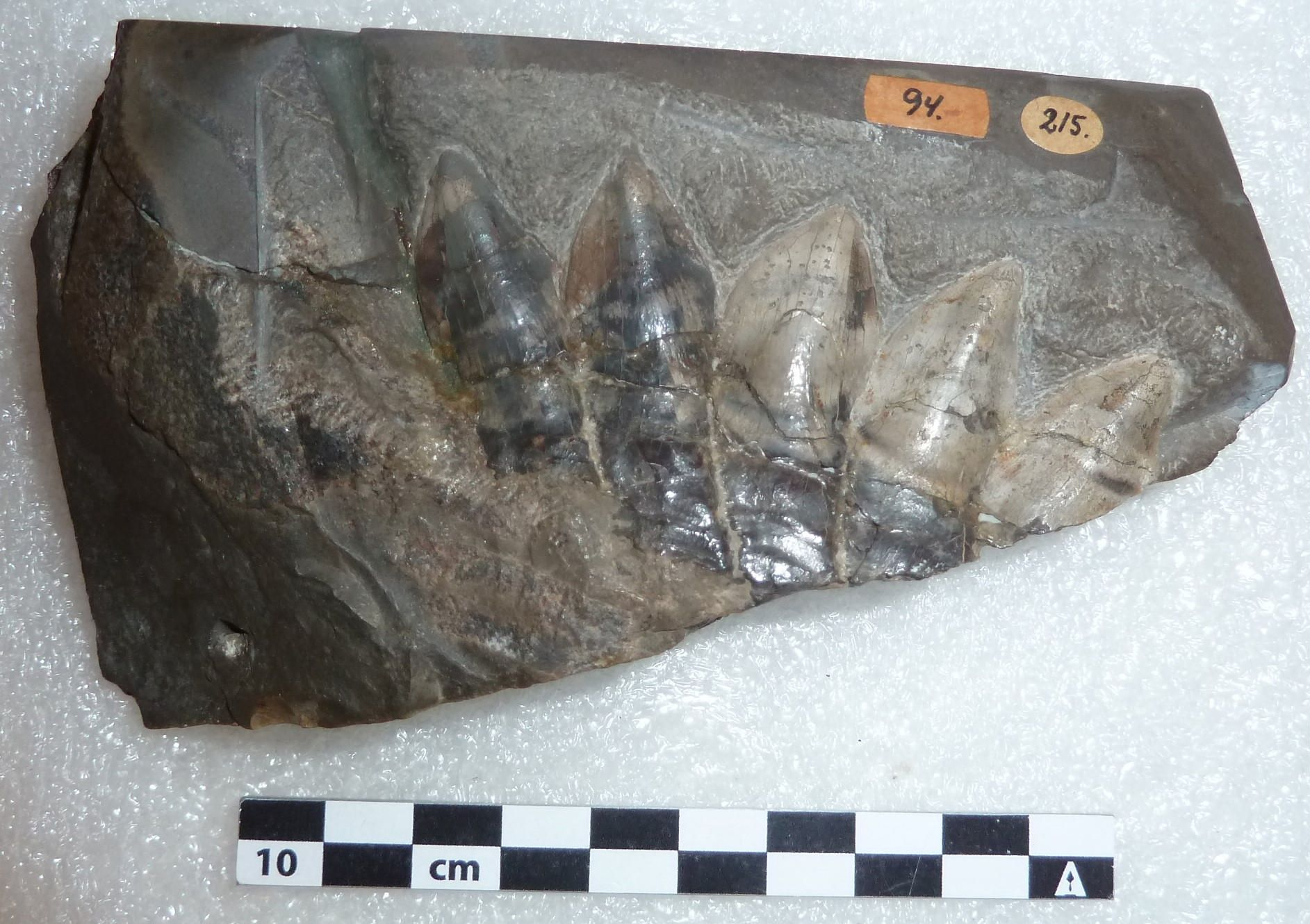
- Paratype specimen of Sarcoprion edax, from the collection of the Natural History Museum of Denmark

Scientific classification
- Kingdom: Animalia
- Phylum: Chordata
- Class: Chondrichthyes
- Subclass: Holocephali
- Order: †Eugeneodontiformes
- Family: †Helicoprionidae
- Genus: †Sarcoprion; Nielsen, 1952

Type species
- Sarcoprion edax Nielsen, 1952

= Sarcoprion =

Sarcoprion Temporal range: Wuchiapingian, 259–254 Ma

Extinct genus of cartilaginous fish

Sarcoprion (from the Ancient Greek, "flesh saw") is an extinct genus of cartilaginous fish from the Late Permian of Greenland. It possessed an arching row of connected teeth, termed a tooth whorl, in its upper and lower jaws, as well as flattened, rectangular teeth elsewhere in the mouth. It is distinguished from other members of its family by the presence of sharp cutting teeth on both the upper and lower jaws. The tooth whorl on the lower jaw bore sharp, compact tooth crowns, while a row of backward facing, triangular teeth was present on the roof of the mouth. The known fossils do not show evidence of a distinct upper jaw, implying it may have been fused to the skull, reduced, or lost entirely. The type and only species in the genus is S. edax. It is a member of order Eugeneodontiformes and the larger subclass Holocephali.

== Research history and naming ==
The first four Sarcoprion edax fossils were first discovered during the 1930s by paleontologist Eigil Nielsen, and originated inside concretions from the Foldvik Creek Formation of East Greenland. These specimens were described by Nielsen in 1952, and the most complete of them was designated as the holotype (name-bearing specimen on which the species is based). Part of the holotype specimen was collected in 1932, and other fragments were collected later in 1937. Nielsen suspected that a larger portion of this specimen was originally preserved, but that it had most likely become broken apart and lost due to erosion. A block of unprepared rock matrix containing the remainder of this specimen's skull has since been identified.

Researcher Leif Tapanila began research on S. edax fossils at the Natural History Museum of Denmark in 2023. As of 2026 the complete holotype skull is being studied via CT scanning.

=== Etymology ===
The genus name is derived from the Greek roots sarcos, meaning "flesh", and prion, meaning "saw". The species name, edax, means "gluttonous".

== Description ==
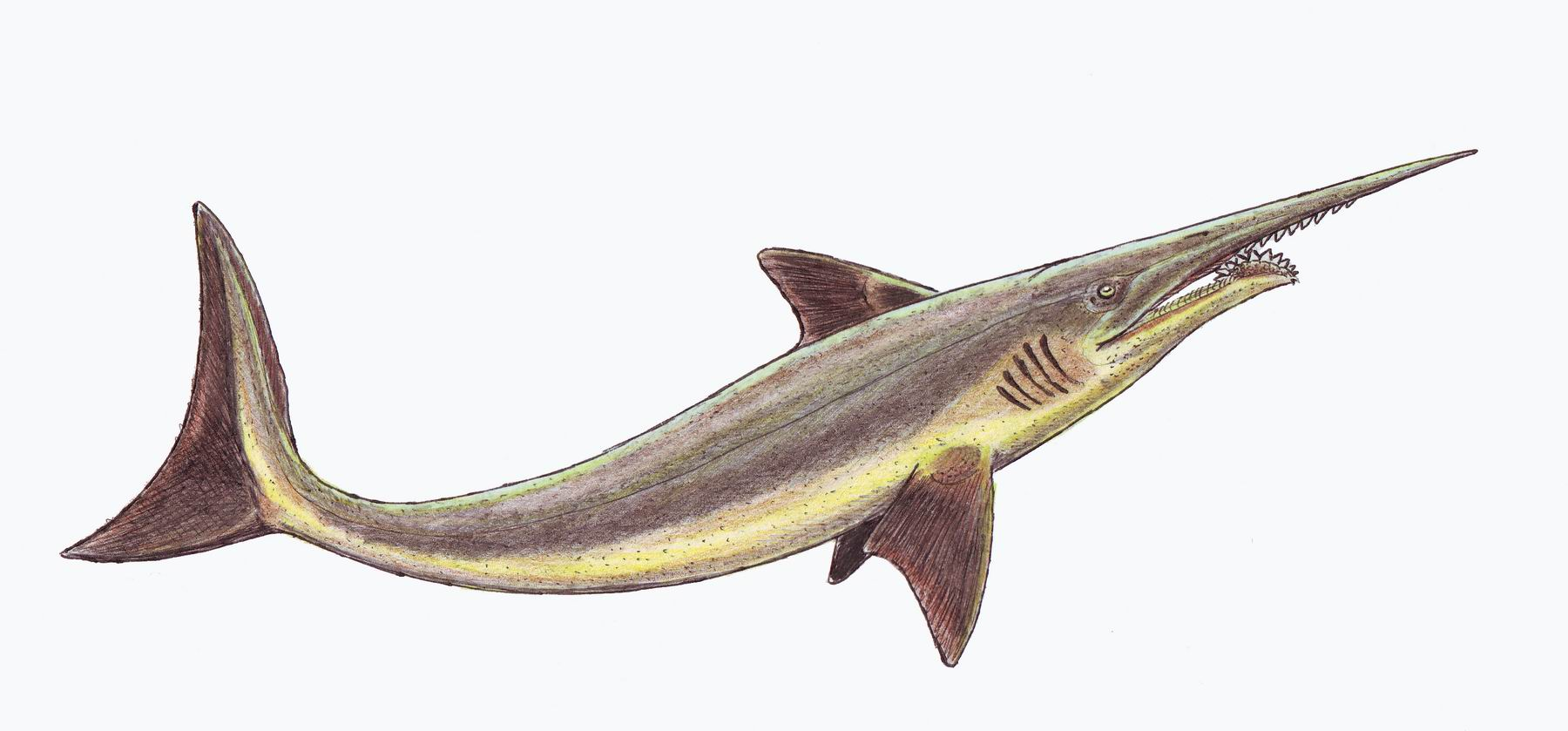
Reconstruction based on the partial skull described by Nielsen (1952)

Sarcoprion had a thin, pointed snout, with two opposing rows of large teeth along the midline of its upper and lower jaws. The rostrum was greatly elongated compared to its relatives with comparable known skull material. The most complete known Sarcoprion specimen consists of a skull and lower jaws which are nearly 90 centimeters (3.0 ft) long, and the total length of the animal was estimated to be up to 6 meters (20 ft) by paleontologist John A. Long.

Nielsen suggested that, based on his reconstruction of the genus' skull and lower jaw, Sarcoprion was likely incapable of closing its mouth. Rows of tile-like, flattened teeth (termed pavement teeth) were present along the lateral surfaces of the mouth in addition to the midline tooth whorls, and Nielsen thought these were likely armor for the snout rather than useful for feeding.

== Classification ==
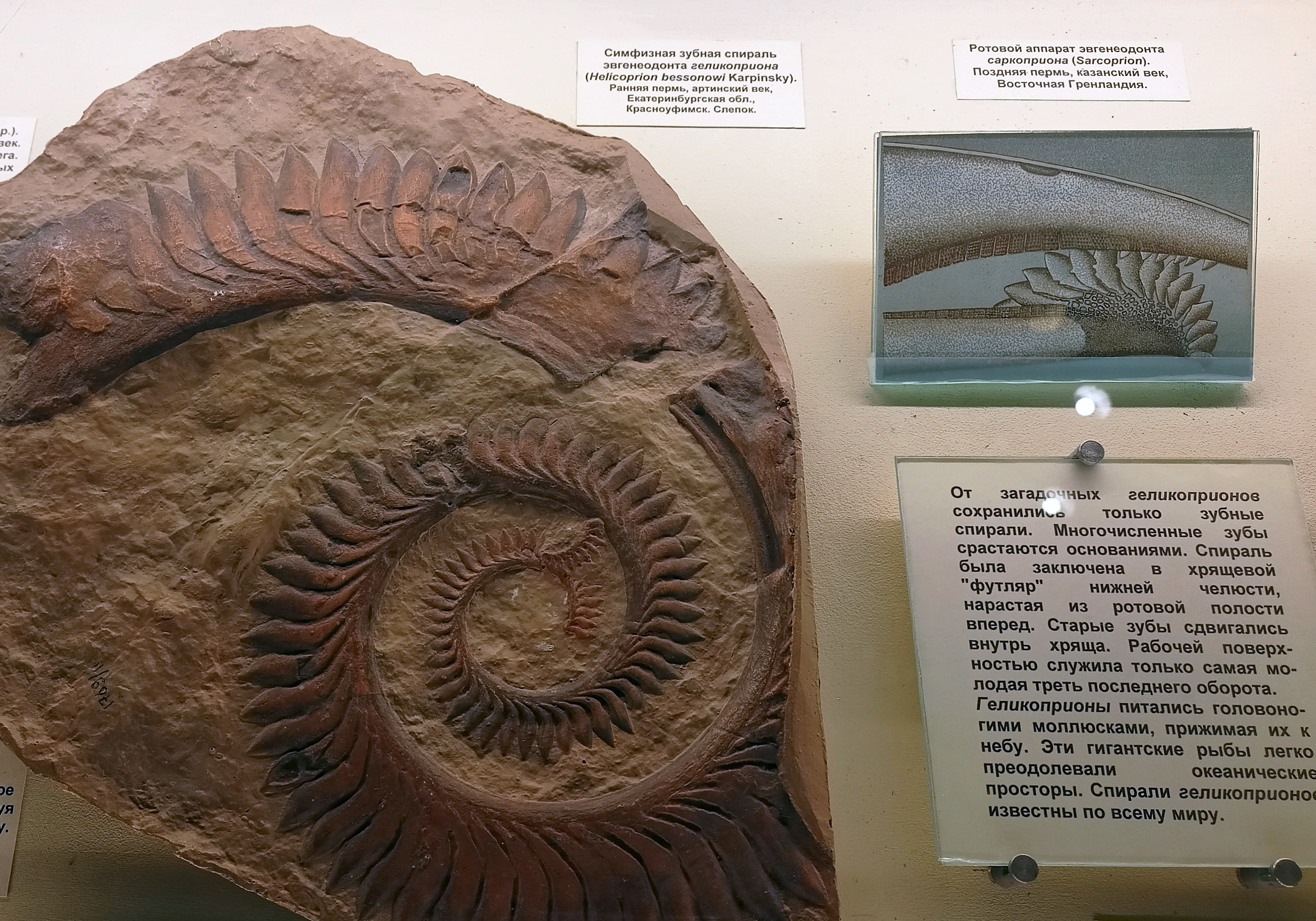
Reconstructed jaw and dentition of Sarcoprion (top right) alongside a whorl of the related Helicoprion bessonowi (left)

Sarcoprion is a member of the order Eugeneodontiformes and the family Helicoprionidae. Earlier research by paleontologist Svend Erik Bendix-Almgreen suggested that the genus may be unrelated to other fish now called eugeneodonts, and instead be part of a group containing only Erikodus and Fadenia. This is no longer supported.

== Paleobiology and paleoecology ==
In life, Sarcoprion was a pelagic predator that likely hunted large prey. The preserved tooth whorls of S. edax show signs of wear, both as a result of contact with prey and from contact with one another. Nielsen, as well as later authors such as Oleg Lebedev and Wayne Itano, have hypothesized that the animal used its whorls like a pair of scissors to cut prey during feeding. In a 2009 paper, Lebedev proposed that features of Sarcoprion's teeth and snout suggest a diet of fish and cephalopods, based on comparisons with living toothed whales such as sperm whales. John Long has speculated that Sarcoprion had a generalist diet that included other cartilaginous fish as well as hard-shelled cephalopods.
