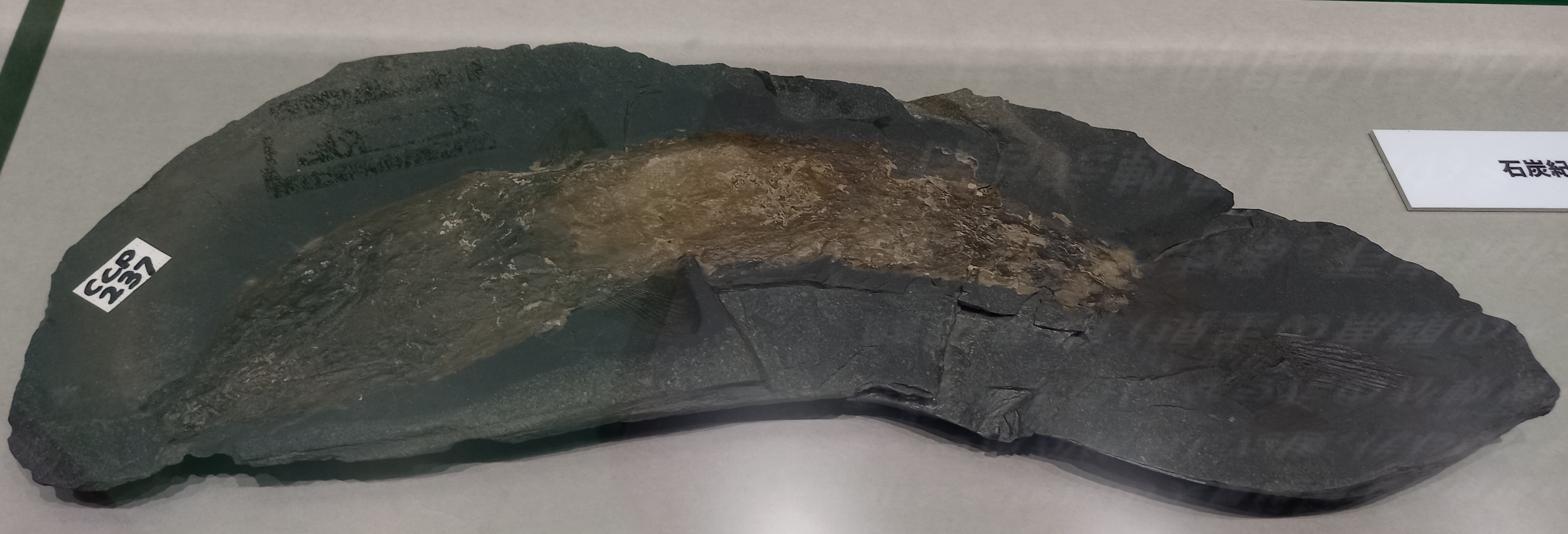
- Body fossil of Romerodus orodontus, a caseodont
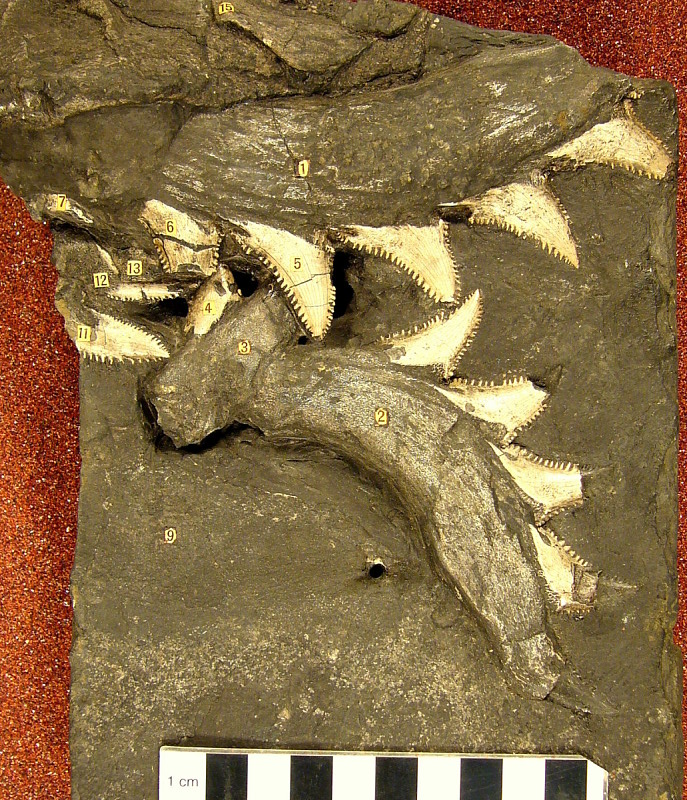
- Jaw cartilage and teeth of Edestus (or Edestodus) minor, an edestoid

Scientific classification
- Kingdom: Animalia
- Phylum: Chordata
- Class: Chondrichthyes
- Subclass: Holocephali
- Order: †Eugeneodontiformes; Zangerl, 1981

Families
- See text

Synonyms
- Eugeneodontida

= Eugeneodontiformes =

Eugeneodontiformes Temporal range: 330.9–247.2 Ma Early Carboniferous (Serpukhovian) to Early Triassic (Olenekian)

Extinct group of cartilaginous fishes

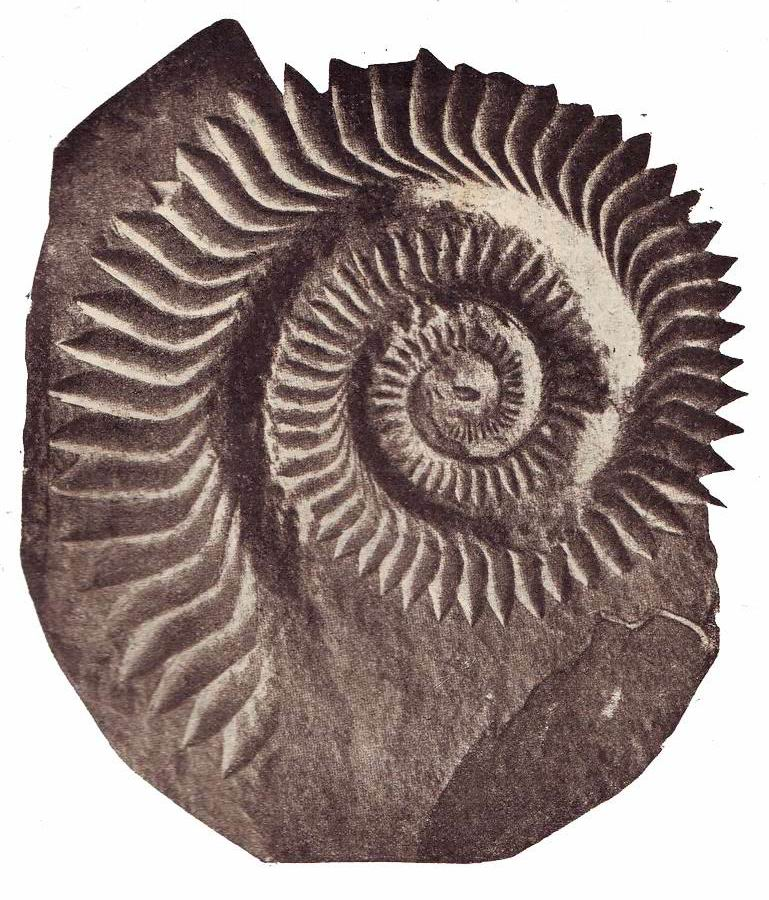
Tooth whorl of Helicoprion bessonowi, which in life was positioned in the lower jaw

Eugeneodontiformes (also called Eugeneodontida) is an extinct and poorly known order of cartilaginous fishes. They possessed "tooth-whorls" on the symphysis of either the lower or both jaws, and pectoral fins supported by long radials. They probably lacked pelvic fins and anal fins. The palatoquadrate was either fused to the skull or reduced in various members of the group. They are now determined to be within the Holocephali; their closest living relatives are chimaeras. The eugeneodonts are named after paleontologist Eugene S. Richardson, Jr. The group first appeared in the fossil record during the late Mississippian (Serpukhovian), and the last eugeneodonts are known from the Early Triassic (Olenekian).

Members of the Eugeneodontiformes are further classified into two superfamilies and either four, five or six different families. The Helicoprionidae (or Agassizodontidae) and Edestidae are assigned to the superfamily Edestoidea, the former containing genera such as Helicoprion and Parahelicoprion, and the latter containing genera such as Edestus. The family Helicampodontidae has been used for genera that do not closely resemble typical members of either of these two groups, and the family Lestrodontidae has been proposed for the genus Lestrodus. The superfamily Eugeneodontoidei (traditionally Caseodontoidea) includes the families Caseodontidae and Eugeneodontidae, which were smaller and less-specialized than the edestoids.

Some members of the superfamily Edestoidea are probably the largest marine animals of their time, though the body length estimates for both genera are somewhat speculative due to both only being known from skulls and teeth. The Late Carboniferous Edestus has been estimated to reach exceed 6.7 metres (22 ft) in length, with some Early Permian Helicoprion suggested to be over 7.6 metres (25 ft) long by some estimates. Eugeneodonts were predatory, with eugeneodontoids likely being generalist feeders and some edestoids being specialized for hunting cephalopods.

== Taxonomy ==
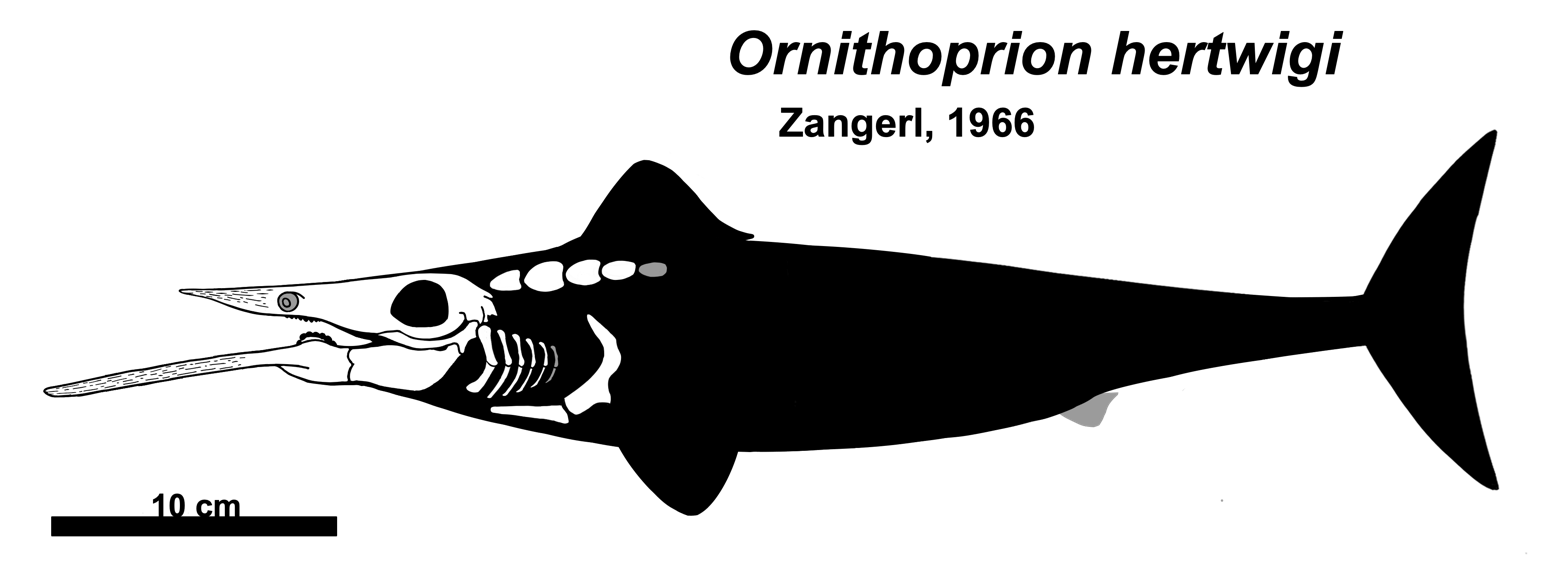
Diagram of Ornithoprion, a specialised member of Caseodontidae

The list below shows taxa included within Eugeneodontiformes.

- Superfamily Eugeneodontoidei
  - Family Caseodontidae
    - Genus Caseodus
    - Genus Erikodus
    - Genus Fadenia
    - Genus Ornithoprion
    - Genus Pirodus
    - Genus Romerodus
  - Family Eugeneodontidae
    - Genus Bobbodus
    - Genus Eugeneodus
    - Genus Gilliodus
  - Family incertae sedis
    - Genus Campodus
    - Genus Chiastodus
    - Genus Tiaraju
- Superfamily Edestoidea
  - Family Edestidae
    - Genus Edestus
    - Genus Edestodus(?)
  - Family Helicampodontidae
    - Genus Helicampodus
    - Genus Hunanohelicoprion
    - Genus Parahelicampodus
    - Genus Sinohelicoprion
  - Family Helicoprionidae
    - Genus Agassizodus
    - Genus Anisopleurodontis(?)
    - Genus Arpagodus
    - Genus Campyloprion
    - Genus Helicoprion
    - Genus Karpinskiprion
    - Genus Parahelicoprion
    - Genus Sarcoprion
    - Genus Toxoprion
  - Family Lestrodontidae
    - Genus Lestrodus
    - Genus Tuyuria
  - Family incertae sedis
    - Genus Paredestus
    - Genus Syntomodus(?)
