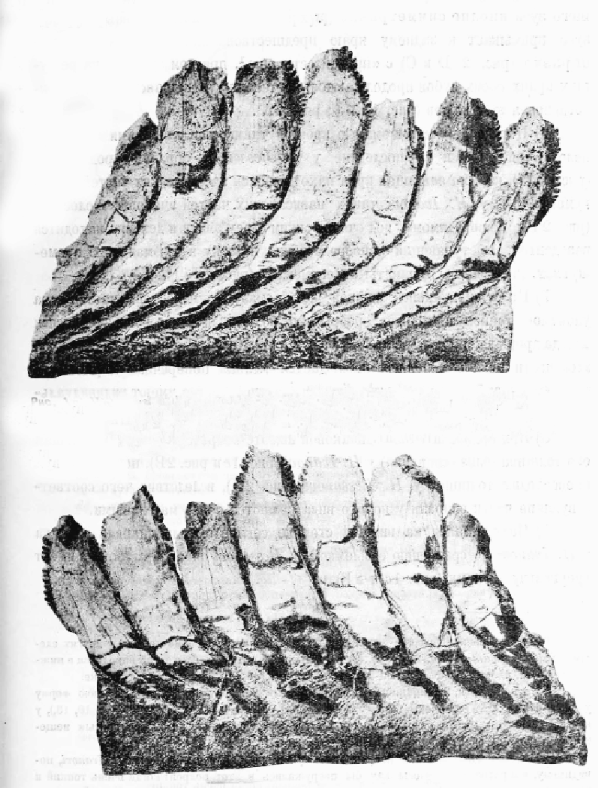
- The holotype specimen of K. ivanovi, PIN 1655/132

Scientific classification
- Kingdom: Animalia
- Phylum: Chordata
- Class: Chondrichthyes
- Order: †Eugeneodontiformes
- Family: †Helicoprionidae
- Genus: †Karpinskiprion; Lebedev & Itano, 2022

Type species
- Helicoprion ivanovi Karpinsky, 1924

= Karpinskiprion =

Karpinskiprion Temporal range: Pennsylvanian, Gzhelian

Extinct genus of cartilaginous fish

Karpinskiprion is an extinct genus of cartilaginous fish from the Late Carboniferous of what is now Russia. It contains one species, Karpinskiprion ivanovi, which was originally described as a species of the genus Helicoprion and later as Campyloprion.

== Discovery and naming ==
Three specimens of Karpinskiprion have been discovered from the Gzhelian-stage Kosherovo Formation of Moscow Oblast, Russia; one of which is the holotype fragment, another is a proportionally larger fragment, another is a more complete pair of fragments. An even more complete specimen was discovered from either the Kurakino Formation or the Parubino Formation of Volograd Oblast, Russia. These sites are approximately the same age as the Kosherovo Formation, and likely also date to the Gzhelian stage. The described material of the genus is in the collection of the Paleontological Institute, Russian Academy of Sciences. Additional fragmentary specimens that may belong to the genus from the late Pennsylvanian are also known; these are in the collection of the Universe History Museum in Dedovsk, Moscow Oblast.

The genus name honors Alexander Karpinsky, who first described the type species in 1924.

== Description ==
Karpinskiprion had a row of serrated teeth arranged in a logarithmic spiral in its lower jaw, termed a tooth whorl. These teeth shared a single connected base (equivalent to the root) and were never shed.

== Classification ==
When first described by Karpinsky, the species was classified in the genus Helicoprion as H. ivanovi. In a 1964 publication, the species was transferred to the genus Campyloprion by author Dmitry Obruchev. The species was then reassigned to its own genus in 2022, after it was determined that the genus Campyloprion was not diagnostic.

Karpinskiprion ivanovi is a member of the order Eugeneodontiformes and the family Helicoprionidae.

== Paleobiology ==
Based on the wear patterns on its teeth, Karpinskiprion is thought to have been a predator of soft-bodied prey. This would include cephalopods and unarmored fish, but because large cephalopods were very rare in the Kosherovo Formation the describers of the genus suggest it primarily ate scaleless fish. Because the shape of the genus' teeth changed over the course of its life, it likely hunted different animals as a juvenile than as an adult.
