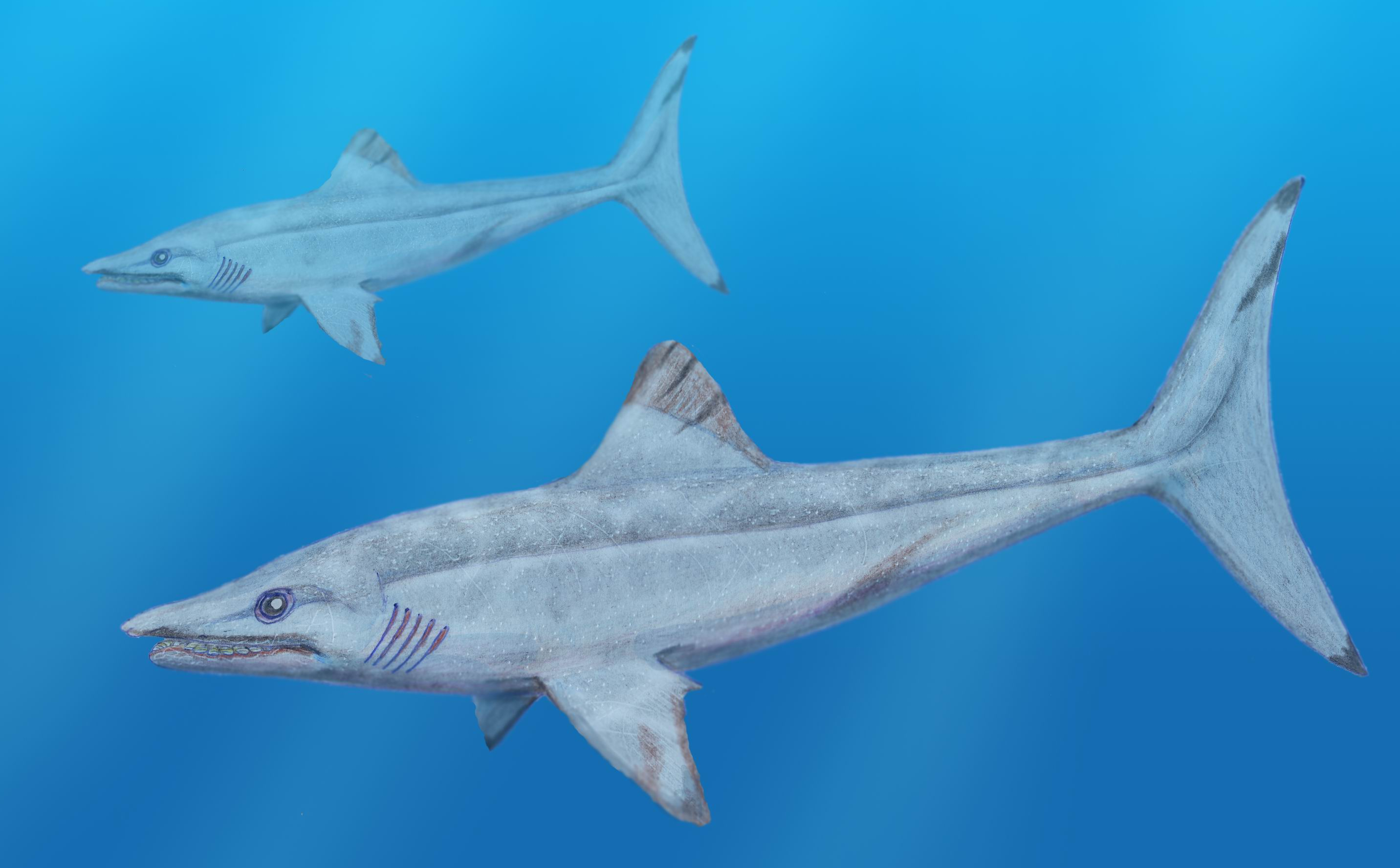
- Life restoration of Caseodus, the type genus
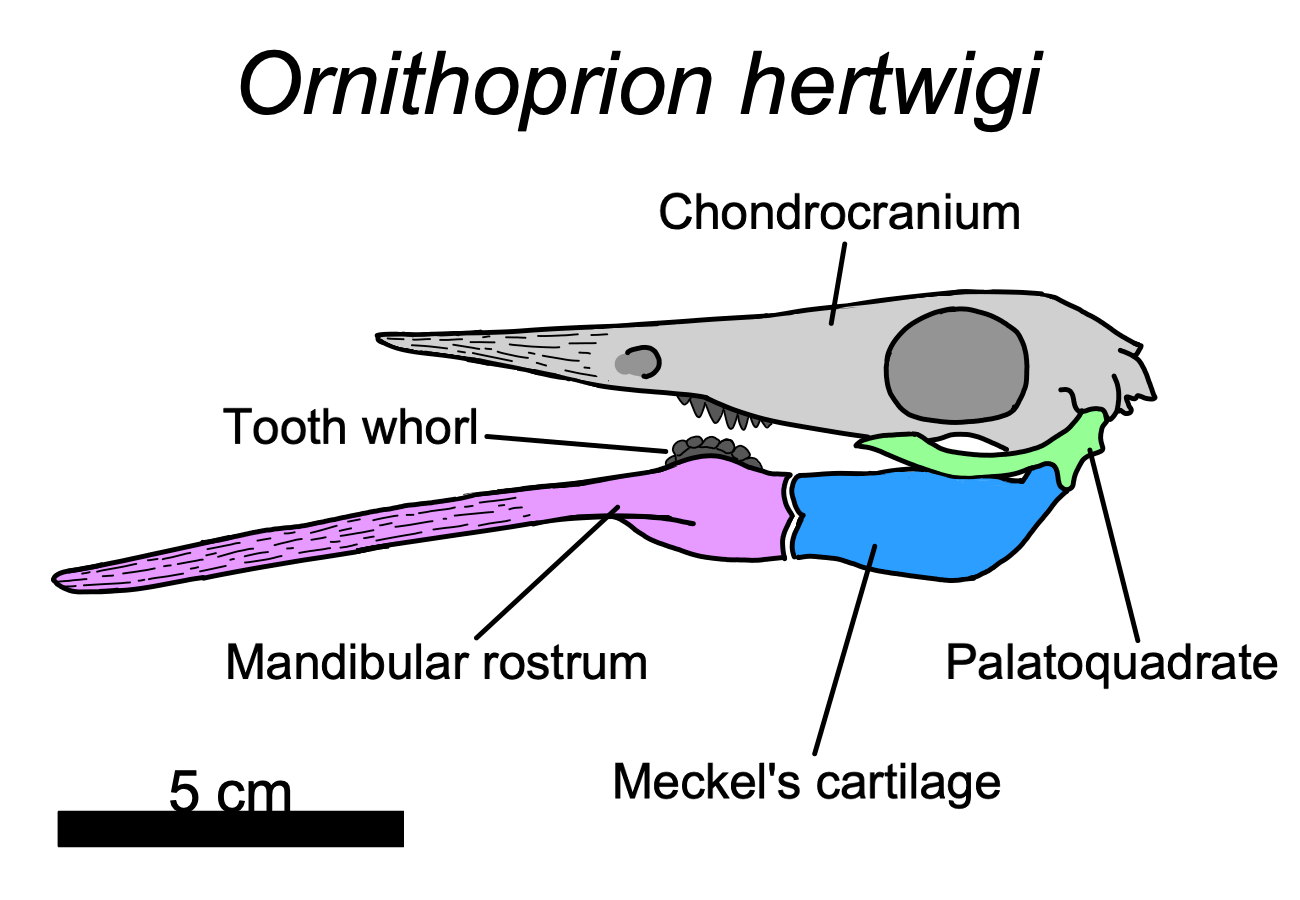
- The skull of Ornithoprion, an aberrant caseodont

Scientific classification
- Kingdom: Animalia
- Phylum: Chordata
- Class: Chondrichthyes
- Order: †Eugeneodontiformes
- Clade: †Caseodontoidea
- Family: †Caseodontidae; Zangerl, 1981

Type genus
- Caseodus Zangerl, 1981

Type species
- Orodus basalis (=Caseodus basalis) Cope, 1894

Genera
- Caseodus; Erikodus; Fadenia; Ornithoprion; Pirodus; Romerodus

= Caseodontidae =

Caseodontidae Temporal range: 315.2–247.2 Ma Early Carboniferous to Early Triassic

Extinct genus of cartilaginous fishes

The Caseodontidae is an extinct family of eugeneodont holocephalans known from the late Paleozoic to earliest Mesozoic of Greenland, Canada and the United States. Members of the group are characterized by a reduced or absent palatoquadrate, elongate upper and mandibular rostra, and bulbous, crushing dentition, including a small symphyseal whorl of teeth on the lower jaw and batteries of teeth fused directly to the neurocranium. Several genera are known from partial or complete body fossils.

Unlike the distantly related helicoprionids, members of this family crossed the Permian-Triassic boundary and persisted into the Olenekian stage of the Early Triassic, after which they became extinct. It is hypothesized that in life caseodonts fed on hard-shelled prey such as brachiopods due to their crushing tooth batteries, and it has been proposed that the elongated rostra on the upper and lower jaws of some genera was an adaptation for prying prey off of the seabed. Well preserved specimens are known from the Carboniferous of Nebraska and Indiana, deposits in East Greenland, and from the Sulphur Mountain Formation of British Columbia, which is the last known appearance of the group.
