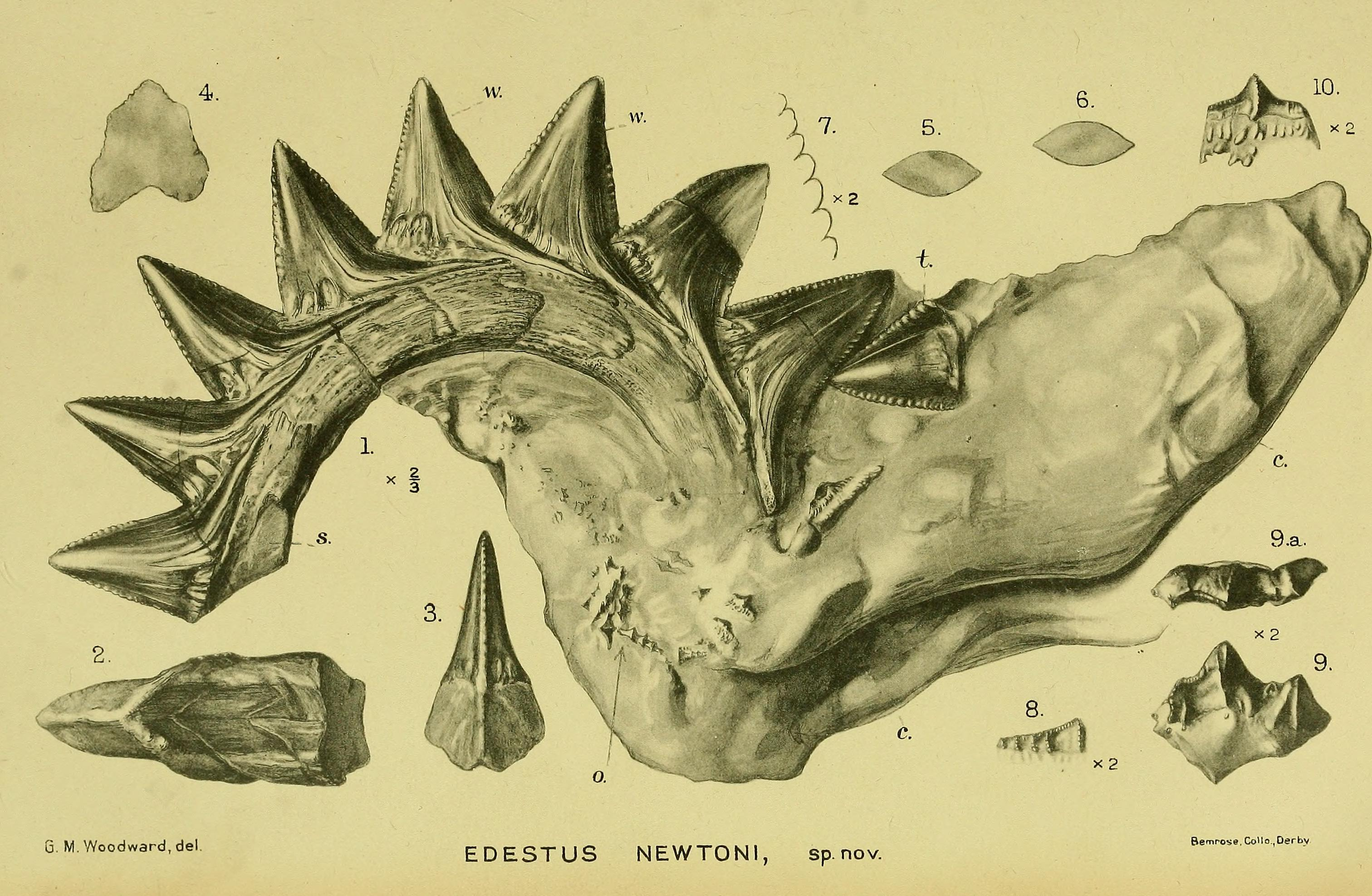
- Tooth whorl of Lestrodus

Scientific classification
- Kingdom: Animalia
- Phylum: Chordata
- Class: Chondrichthyes
- Order: †Eugeneodontiformes
- Family: †Lestrodontidae
- Genus: †Lestrodus; Obruchev, 1953
- Species: †L. newtoni

Binomial name
- †Lestrodus newtoni (Woodward, 1916)

Synonyms
- Edestus newtoni Woodward, 1916

= Lestrodus =

Lestrodus Temporal range: Bashkirian

Extinct genus of cartilaginous fishes

Lestrodus is an extinct genus of eugeneodont that lived during the Late Carboniferous. It contains one valid species, L. newtoni, which is known from a single tooth whorl from the Millstone Grit of England. It was originally named as a species of Edestus, but is now considered a distinct genus based on morphological differences.
