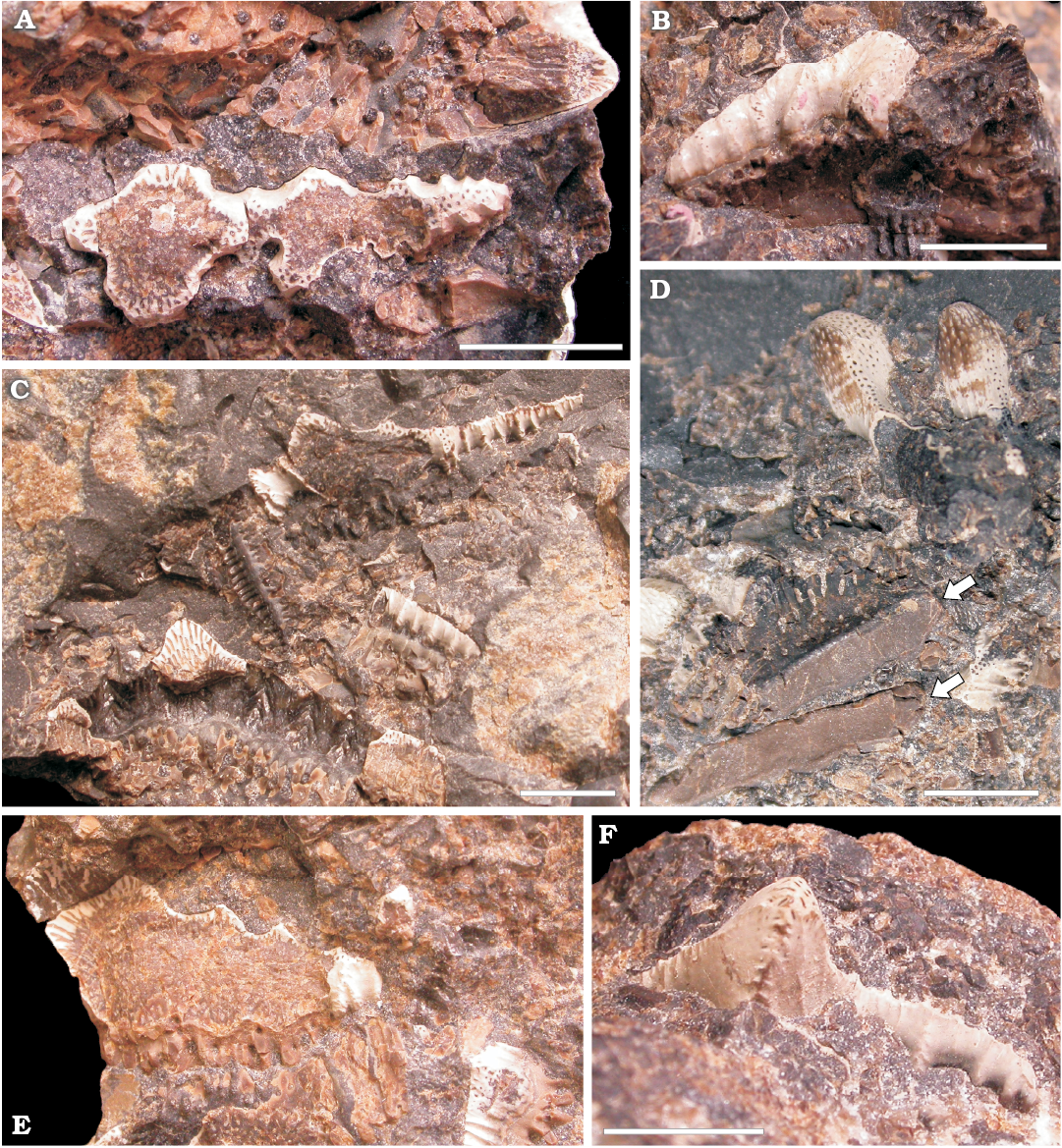
- Teeth of C. agassizianus from Derbyshire, England

Scientific classification
- Kingdom: Animalia
- Phylum: Chordata
- Class: Chondrichthyes
- Subclass: Holocephali
- Order: †Eugeneodontida
- Clade: †Caseodontoidea
- Genus: †Campodus; Koninck, 1844

Species
- C. agassizianus Koninck, 1844; C. corrugatus Newberry and Worthen, 1870; C. scitulus Saint John and Worthen, 1875; C. virginianus Saint John and Worthen, 1875

= Campodus =

Campodus Temporal range: Carboniferous, Visean–Bashkirian

Extinct genus of cartilaginous fishes

Campodus is an extinct genus of eugeneodont holocephalans from the Carboniferous. Likely one of the earliest and most basal caseodontoids, it can be characterized by its broad, ridge-ornamented crushing teeth made of various types of dentine. The type species, C. agassizianus, was originally described in 1844 based on a small number of teeth from the Namurian of Belgium.

Additional fossils have been referred to the genus. These include Belgian specimens referred by Lohest (1884), fossils from Missouri referred by Zangerl (1981), and symphyseal tooth-whorls from Nebraska and Kansas referred by Eastman (1902). The tooth whorls were given their own species, C. variabilis. They shared some similarity to a massive "Agassizodus" jaw apparatus found in Osage, Kansas and described by St. John & Worthen (1875). This has led some authors to the conclusion that Agassizodus and Campodus were synonyms. However, others note that clearly identifiable Campodus teeth have not been found in the same areas from which Agassizodus was originally described. Ginter (2018) concluded that Eastman's "C. variabilis" and St. John & Worthen (1875)'s "Agassizodus" belonged to neither Campodus nor Agassizodus, and instead represented a new unnamed genus. Ginter additionally referred a specimen from Derbyshire, England to Campodus agassizianus.
