= Campyloprion =

Campyloprion Temporal range: Gzhelian, 303.4–298.9 Ma

Scientific classification
- Kingdom: Animalia
- Phylum: Chordata
- Class: Chondrichthyes
- Order: †Eugeneodontiformes
- Family: †Helicoprionidae
- Genus: †Campyloprion; Eastman, 1902

Species
- †C. annectans

Extinct genus of cartilaginous fishes

Campyloprion is a dubious extinct genus of large shark-like eugenodont fish. Only the species Campyloprion annectans from Texas and New Mexico is recognized, and the former species "C." ivanovi from Russia is now assigned to the genus Karpinskiprion. C. annectans lived during the Gzhelian stage of the Carboniferous period, approximately 303.4–298.9 million years ago. There is a small gap in age between the latest Edestus and the first Campyloprion, which suggests that Campyloprion might have evolved to fit into an ecological niche left vacant by the extinction of Edestus. The fact that Campyloprion is older than Helicoprion suggests, but does not prove, that it is a direct ancestor of Helicoprion.

== Description ==
Campyloprion teeth resemble those of Helicoprion, but the tooth whorl has an open spiral shape, more loosely coiled than that of Helicoprion.
