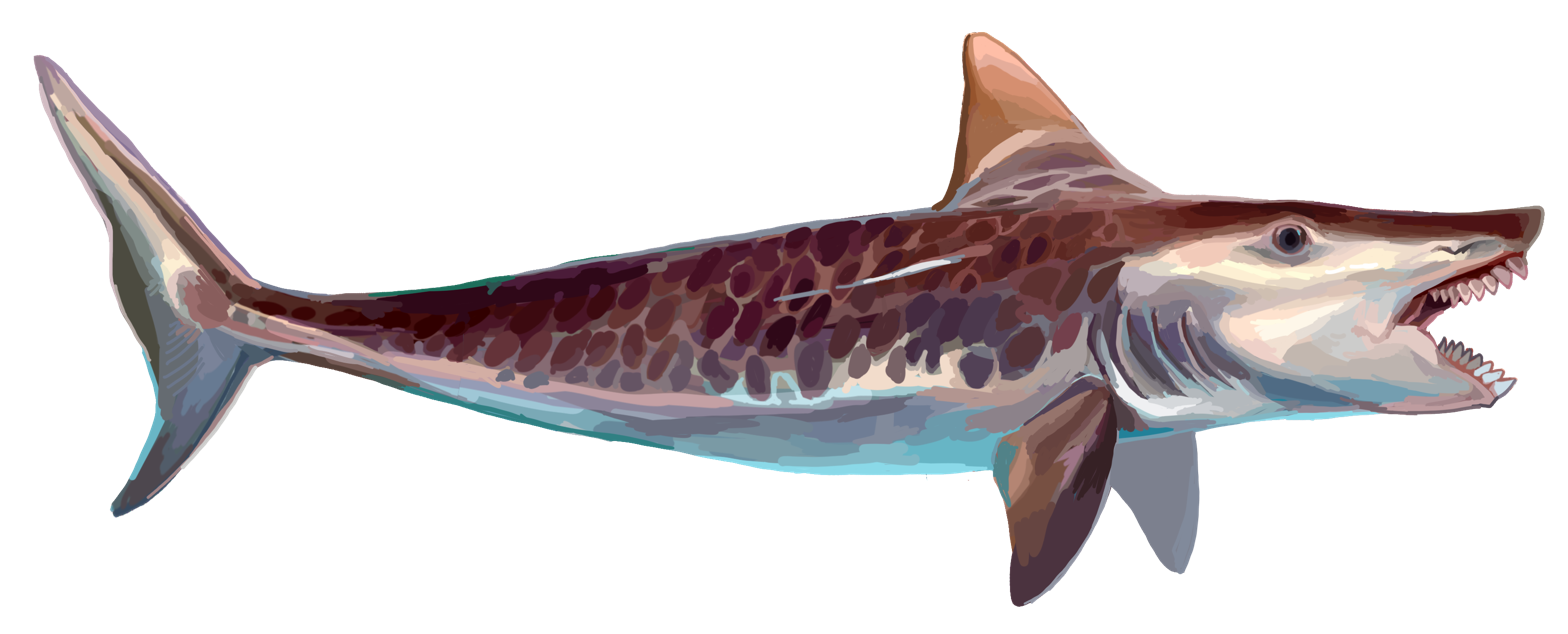
- Artist's reconstruction of Edestus heinrichi

Scientific classification
- Kingdom: Animalia
- Phylum: Chordata
- Class: Chondrichthyes
- Subclass: Holocephali
- Order: †Eugeneodontiformes
- Clade: †Edestoidea
- Family: †Edestidae; Jaekel, 1899

Genera
- †Edestus; †Paredestus?; †Syntomodus

= Edestidae =

Edestidae Temporal range: 358.9–251.2 Ma Early Carboniferous to Early Triassic

Extinct family of cartilaginous fishes

The Edestidae are a poorly known, extinct family of shark-like eugeneodontid holocephalid cartilaginous fish.

Similar to the related family Helicoprionidae, members of this family possessed a unique "tooth-whorl" on the symphysis of the lower jaw and pectoral fins supported by long radials. In addition to having a tooth-whorl on the lower jaw, at least one species of the genus Edestus had a second tooth-whorl in the upper jaw. The palatoquadrate was either fused to the skull or reduced. Edestids, along with the rest of the Eugeneodontida, are placed within the subclass Holocephali. The family disappeared in the Early Triassic.

Restoration of the skull of E. heinrichi
