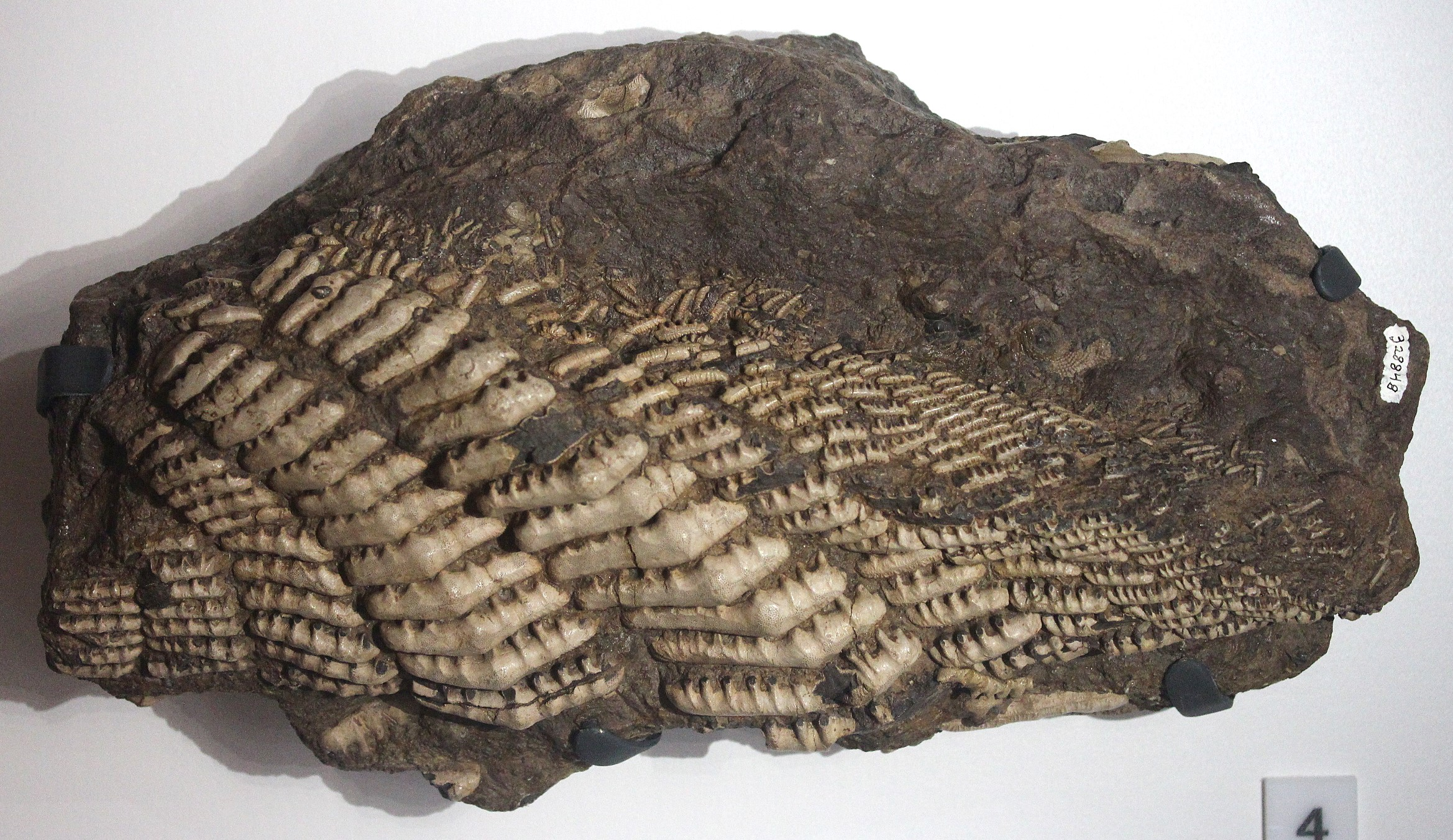
- Fossil tooth whorl

Scientific classification
- Kingdom: Animalia
- Phylum: Chordata
- Class: Chondrichthyes
- Order: †Eugeneodontiformes
- Family: †Helicoprionidae
- Genus: †Agassizodus; St. John and Worthen 1875

Type species
- †Agassizodus variabilis Newberry and Worthen, 1870

= Agassizodus =

Agassizodus Temporal range: Pennsylvanian

Extinct genus of cartilaginous fishes

Agassizodus is an extinct genus of eugeneodont holocephalian fish that lived during the Carboniferous Period. It belongs to the family Helicoprionidae, which is sometimes called Agassizodontidae. Like other members of its family, it possessed a symphyseal tooth whorl, which was likely present at the tip of the lower jaw and associated with lateral crushing tooth plates. The type species, A. variabilis, was originally named Lophodus variabilis until the name "Lophodus" was determined to be preoccupied.

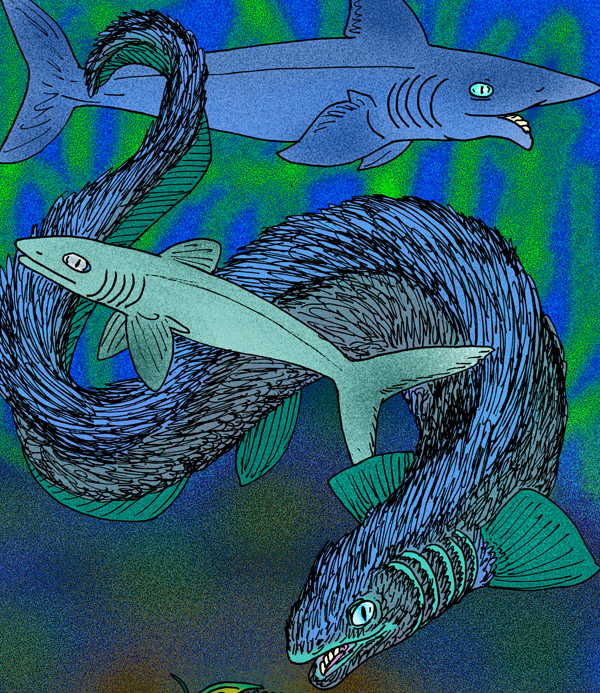
Agassizodus in the upper right, Romerodus, and the center, and Listracanthus behind

A. variabilis was originally based on tooth fragments from the Pennsylvanian of Illinois, but the authors who named the genus (St. John and Worthen, 1875) also referred a massive jaw from Osage County, Kansas. The Osage jaw shared some similarities to tooth-whorls from the area, which were later described by Eastman (1902). Eastman concluded that the tooth whorls and jaw belonged to Campodus, so he renamed Agassizodus variabilis to Campodus variabilis. Other authors disagree, arguing that the Eastman specimens and the Osage jaw represent neither Agassizodus or Campodus, but rather an entirely new genus.
