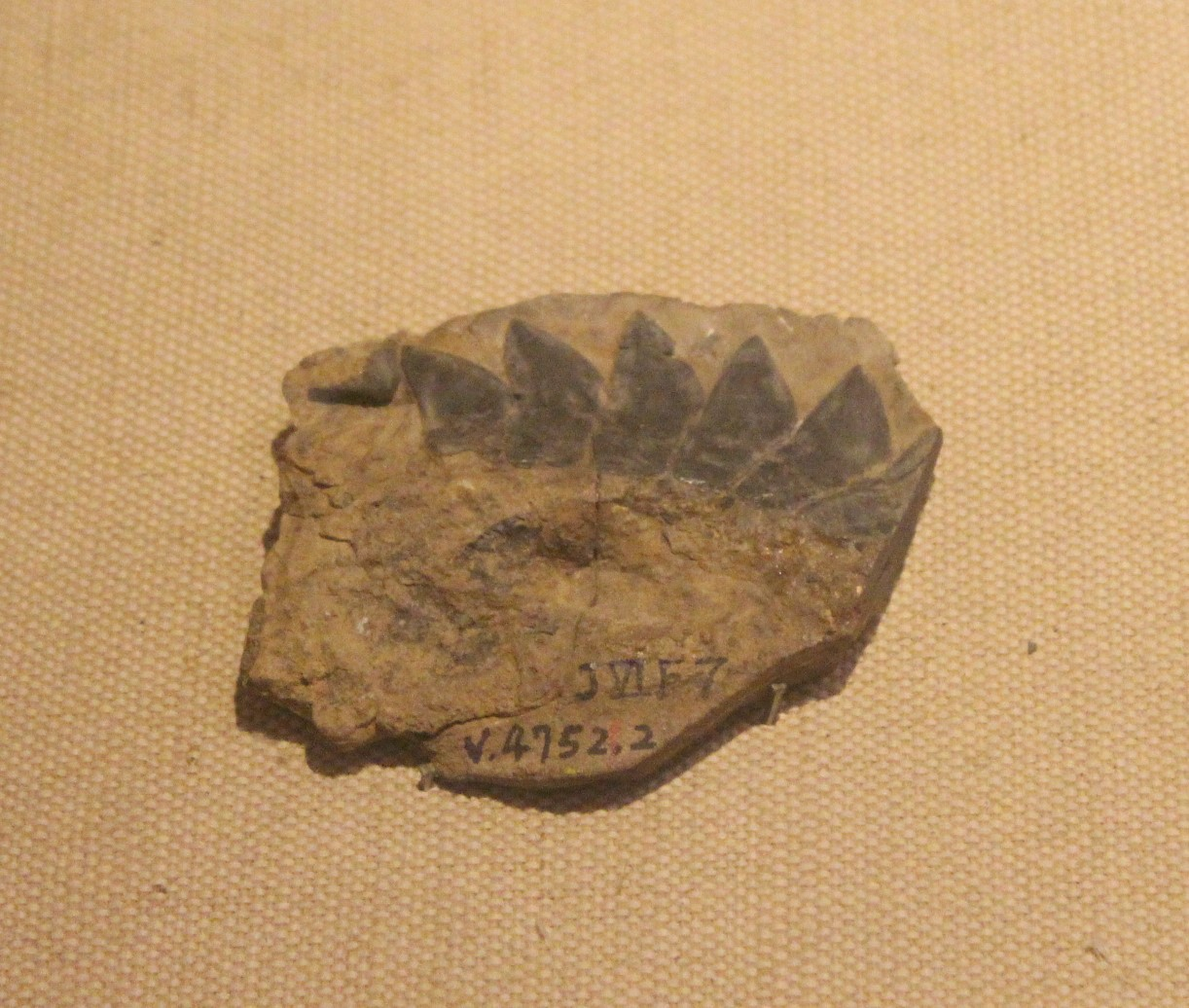
- Tooth whorl (IVPP V4752.2) of S. qomolangma, Paleozoological Museum of China

Scientific classification
- Kingdom: Animalia
- Phylum: Chordata
- Class: Chondrichthyes
- Order: †Eugeneodontiformes
- Family: †Helicampodontidae
- Genus: †Sinohelicoprion; Liu & Chang, 1963

Species
- S. changhsingensis Liu & Chang, 1963 (type); S. macrodontus Lei, 1983; S. qomolangma Zhang, 1974

= Sinohelicoprion =

Sinohelicoprion Temporal range: 254–251 Ma Changhsingian-Induan?

Extinct genus of cartilaginous fishes

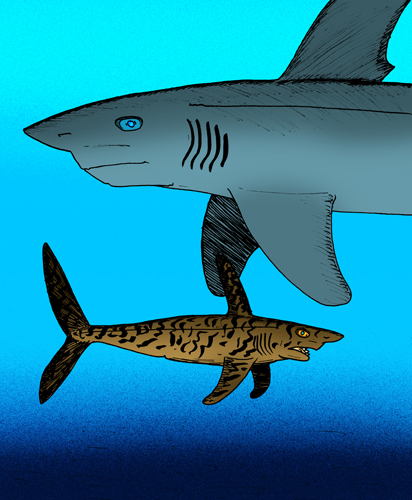
Comparison of S. changhsingensis and Helicoprion sp.

Sinohelicoprion (meaning "Chinese spiral saw" or "Chinese Helicoprion") is an extinct genus of eugeneodontid fish that lived during the late Permian and possibly the Early Triassic, from 254 to 251 million years ago.

It was first named and classified by H. T. Liu and M. N. Chang in 1963.
