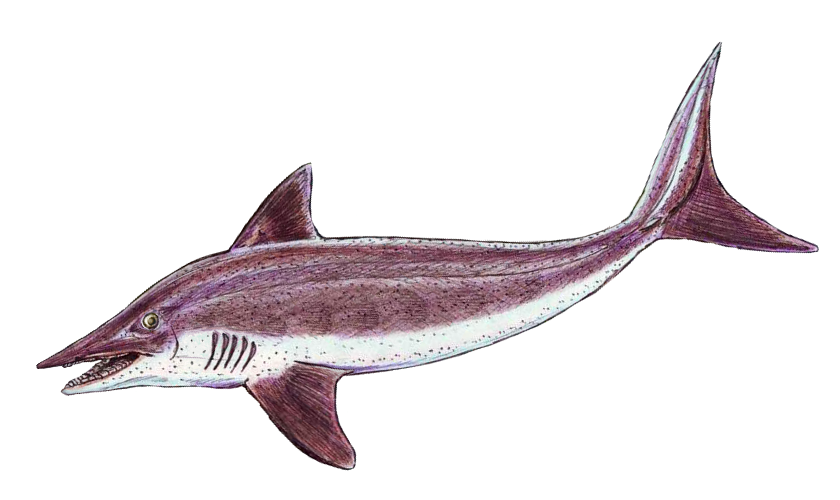
- Fadenia crenulata

Scientific classification
- Kingdom: Animalia
- Phylum: Chordata
- Class: Chondrichthyes
- Order: †Eugeneodontiformes
- Family: †Caseodontidae
- Genus: †Fadenia; Nielsen, 1932

Type species
- †Fadenia crenulata Nielsen, 1932

Other species
- †F. gigas Eaton, 1962; †F. makrothi? Geinitz, 1861; †F. monscana Trautschold, 1874; †F. uroclasmato Mutter & Neuman, 2008

= Fadenia =

Fadenia Temporal range: Carboniferous – Early Triassic, 320–247.2 Ma

Extinct genus of cartilaginous fishes

Fadenia is an extinct genus of eugeneodontid holocephalian chondrichthyan from the Carboniferous Period of Missouri (United States), the Permian period of Greenland, and the Early Triassic epoch of British Columbia, Canada (Sulphur Mountain Formation).

== Discovery and naming ==
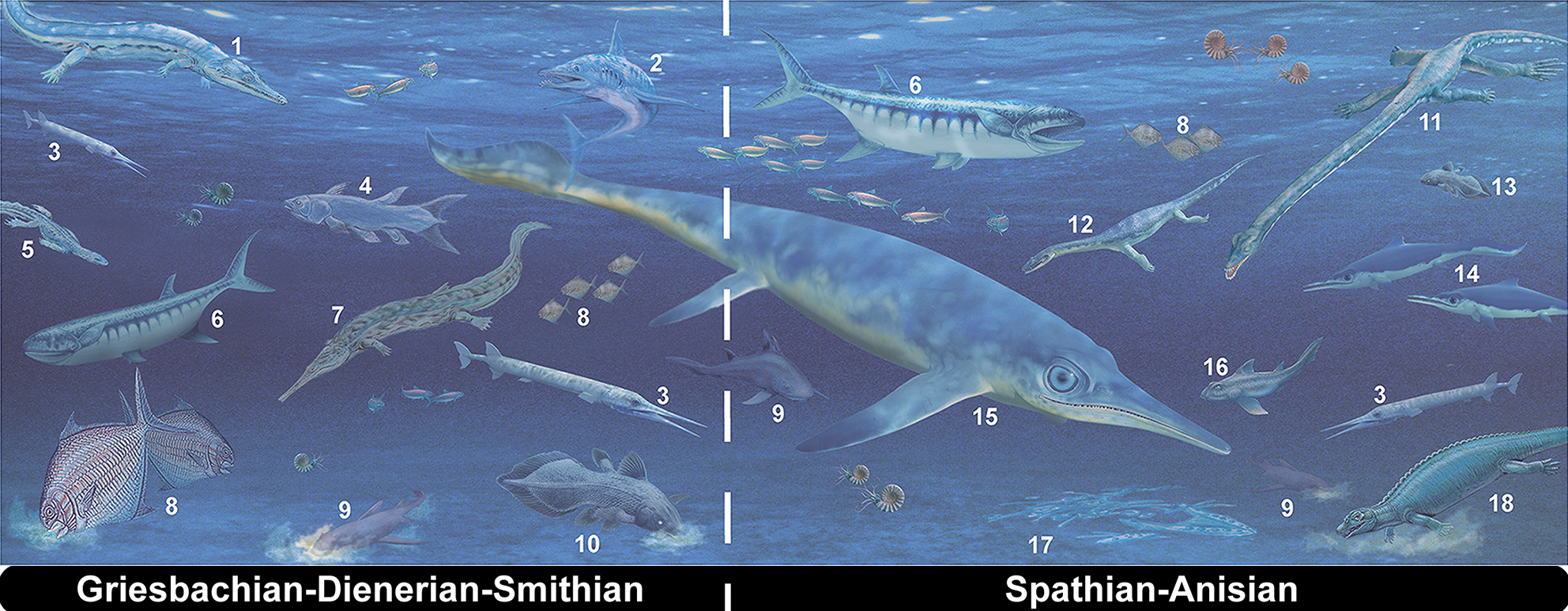
Early Triassic and Middle Triassic marine predators: 2. Fadenia

The first fossils of Fadenia were discovered and described in the periodical Meddelelser om Grønland in 1932 by the Danish vertebrate palaeontologist Eigil Nielsen after studying the Upper Permian beds of Cape Stosch, in the fjord of Godthab Gulf in King Christian X Land, East Greenland. Nielsen had joined at the beginning of the Three-year Expedition to East Greenland led by Danish geologist and explorer Lauge Koch. The manager of the expedition was the botanist Gunnar Seidenfaden, after whose surname the genus was named.

== Classification ==
Fadenia belongs to Eugeneodontida, an extinct order of Chondrichthyes that are characterized by the presence of tooth whorls. Fadenia is one of the few eugeneodont genera that survived the end-Permian mass extinction event, and it was one of the latest-surviving members of this clade. It could reach about 1.5 metres (4.9 ft) in length.
