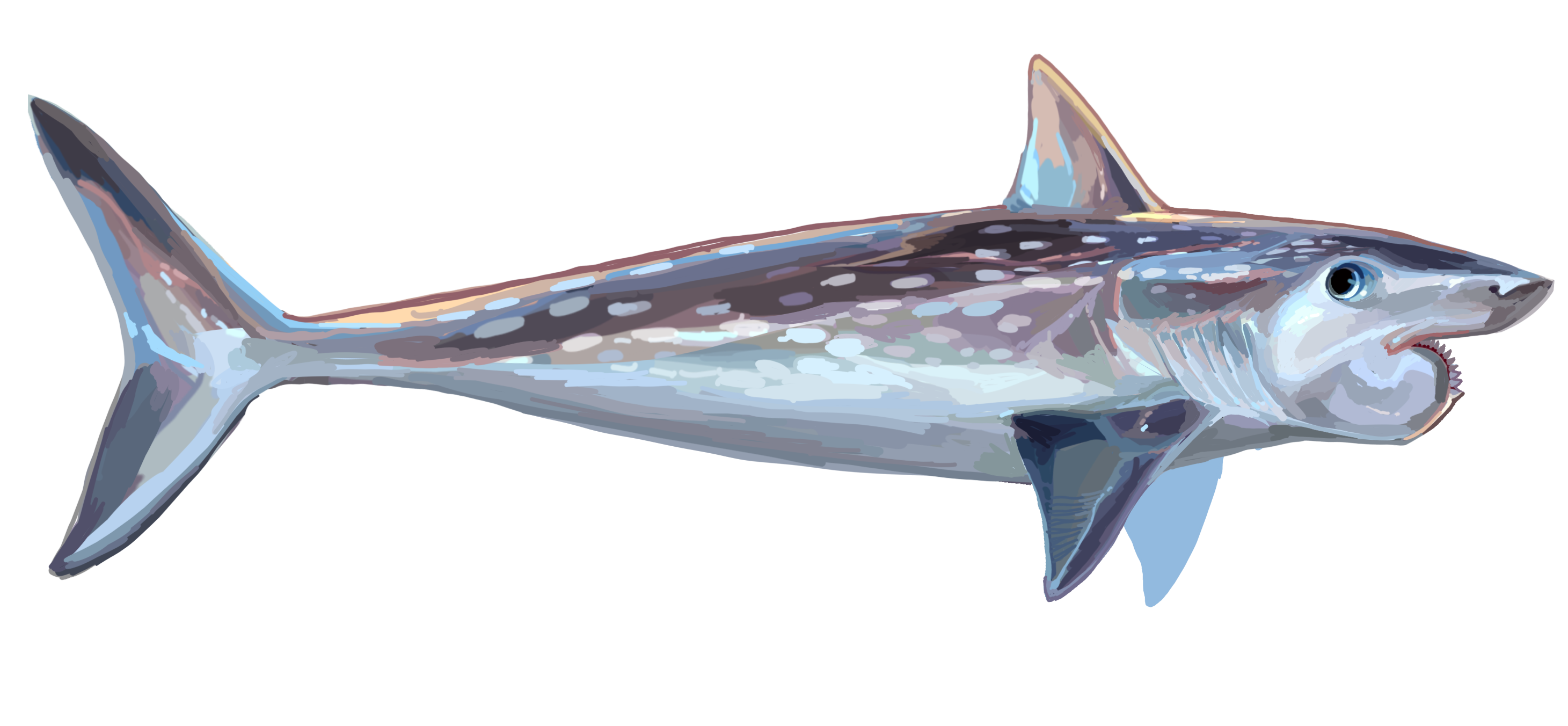
- Helicoprion

Scientific classification
- Kingdom: Animalia
- Phylum: Chordata
- Class: Chondrichthyes
- Subclass: Holocephali
- Order: †Eugeneodontiformes
- Clade: †Edestoidea
- Family: †Helicoprionidae; Karpinsky, 1911

Type genus
- Helicoprion Karpinsky, 1899

Type species
- Helicoprion bessonowi Karpinsky, 1899

Genera
- Agassizodus; Helicoprion; Karpinskiprion; Parahelicoprion; Sarcoprion; Shaktauites; Toxoprion

Synonyms
- Agassizodontidae Zangerl, 1981

= Helicoprionidae =

Helicoprionidae Temporal range: 358–252 Ma Early Carboniferous to Late Permian

Extinct family of cartilaginous fishes

Helicoprionidae (sometimes referred to as Agassizodontidae) is an extinct family of holocephalans within the order Eugeneodontida. Members of the Helicoprionidae possessed a "whorl" of tooth crowns connected by a single root along the midline of the lower jaw. While historically considered elasmobranchs related to sharks and rays, the closest living relatives of the Helicoprionidae and all other eugeneodonts are now thought to be the ratfishes. The anatomy of the tooth-whorls vary between taxa, with some possessing highly specialized, coiling spirals (such as those of the namesake genus Helicoprion), while others such as Sarcoprion and Parahelicoprion possessed shorter whorls.
