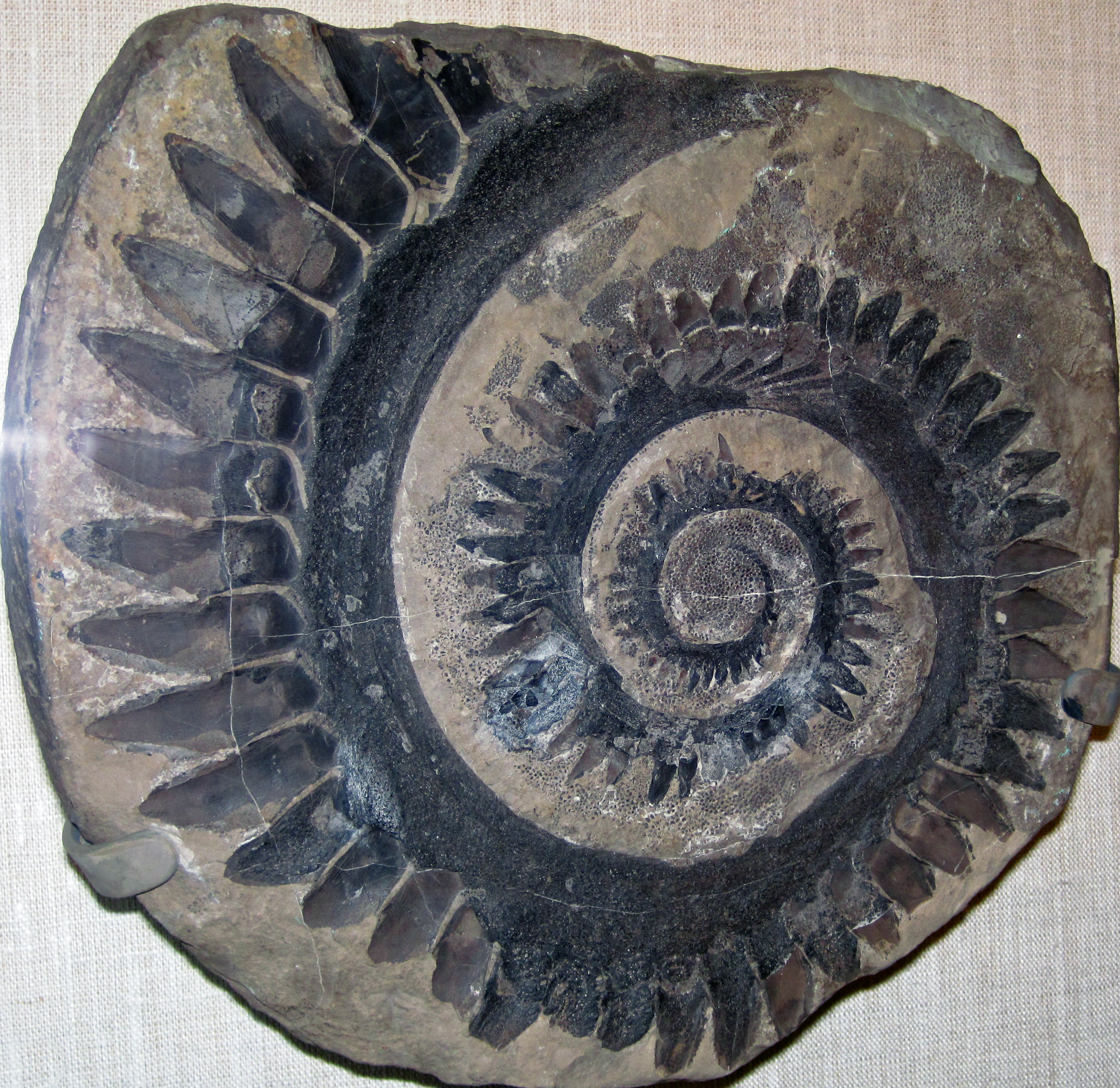
- Tooth-whorl of H. davisii from the Phosphoria Formation of Idaho, Utah Field House of Natural History

Scientific classification
- Kingdom: Animalia
- Phylum: Chordata
- Class: Chondrichthyes
- Subclass: Holocephali
- Order: †Eugeneodontiformes
- Family: †Helicoprionidae
- Genus: †Helicoprion; Karpinsky, 1899

Type species
- Helicoprion bessonowi Karpinsky, 1899

Other species
- H. davisii (Woodward, 1886); H. ergassaminon Bendix-Almgreen, 1966

Synonyms
- List of synonyms: Genus synonyms; Lissoprion Hay, 1907; Parahelicoprion? Karpinsky, 1916 Synonyms of H. bessonowi; H. nevadensis Wheeler, 1939; H. svalis? Siedlecki, 1970 Synonyms of H. davisii; H. ferrieri (Hay, 1907); H. sierrensis Wheeler, 1939; H. jingmenense Chen et al., 2007 Indeterminate species; H. karpinskii Obruchev, 1953; H. mexicanus Müllerried, 1945

= Helicoprion =

Helicoprion Temporal range: Cisuralian to Guadalupian (Artinskian to Roadian), 290–270 Ma

Extinct genus of cartilaginous fish

Helicoprion is an extinct genus of large shark-like cartilaginous fish that lived from the Early to the Middle Permian, about 290-270 million years ago. Helicoprion is a member of the Eugeneodontiformes, an extinct order of cartilaginous fish within the clade Holocephali, a group today represented only by chimaeras. It is also the type genus of the Helicoprionidae, a family of eugeneodonts characterised by distinctive tooth structures called tooth whorls. Helicoprion was first named in 1899 by Alexander Karpinsky on the basis of fossils discovered in Russia and Australia, the generic name meaning "spiral saw". Although numerous species were subsequently assigned to the genus, only H. bessonowi, H. davisii, and H. ergassaminon are recognized following a 2013 revision. The three species are distinguished by the shape and spacing of their tooth crowns.

Helicoprion is mainly known from its fused, spiral-shaped tooth whorls, which account for almost all documented fossils of the taxon. The position and function of these structures was long debated, but studies based on specimens preserving jaw cartilage indicate that they were positioned in the lower jaw and were specialised for grasping and slicing soft-bodied prey such as cephalopods. The whorl may also have aided in shelling or extracting the bodies of nautiloids and ammonoids. Based on the skeletal anatomy of smaller eugeneodonts, Helicoprion is estimated to have reached lengths between 5 and 12 m (16 and 39 ft), with a general external appearance possibly comparable to that of tunas, swordfish, or mackerel sharks. Fossils of Helicoprion are known from marine deposits worldwide, indicating that it was pelagic and had a cosmopolitan distribution. The highest concentrations of these come from Idaho and Russia, which used to be covered by deep inland seas where Helicoprion may have congregated.

== Research history ==
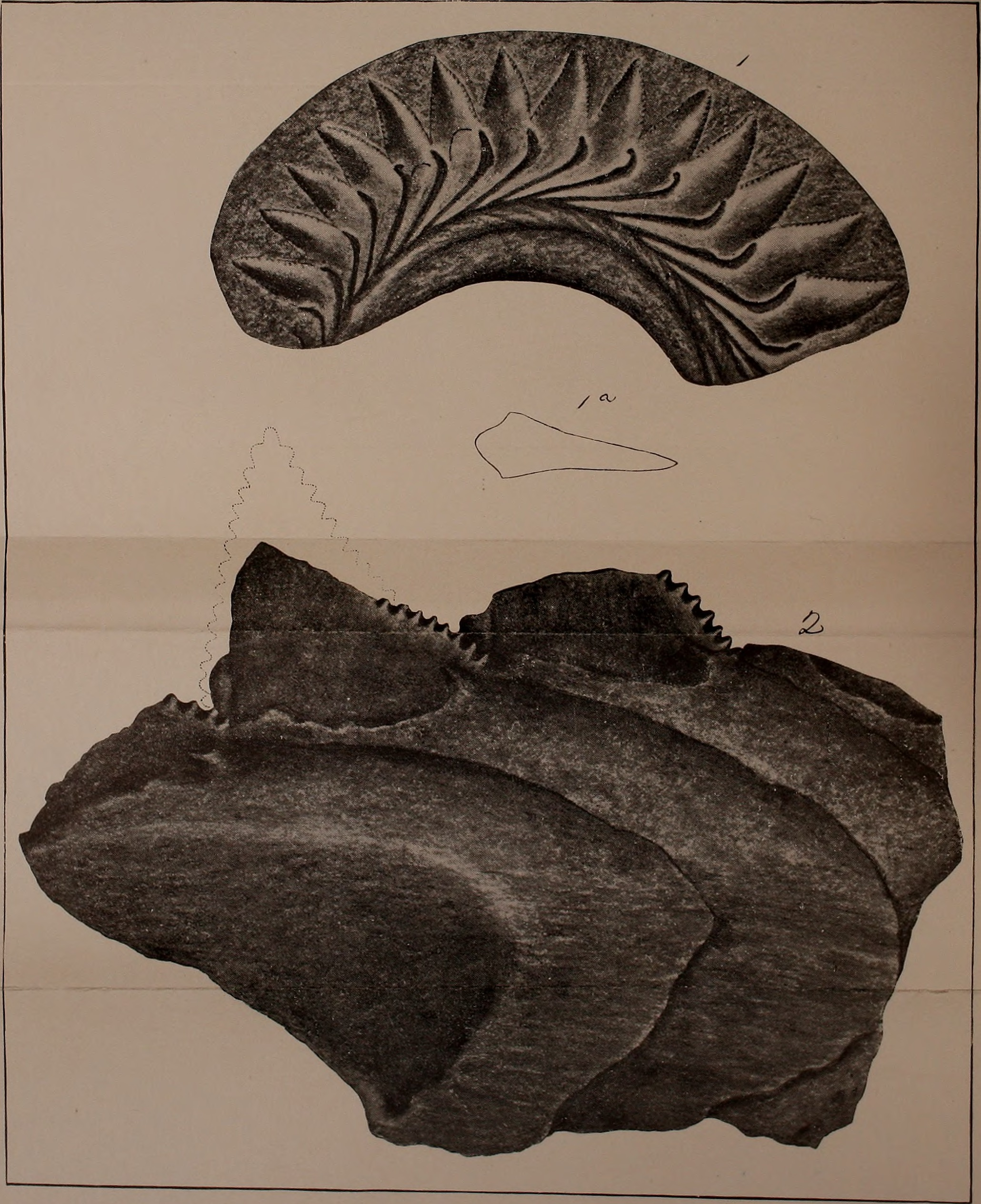
Lithographic figures of various eugeneodont fossils, the holotype of H. davisii (WAMAG 9080) being shown at the top (fig. 1)

The first known specimen of Helicoprion consists of a partial tooth whorl preserving 15 teeth, 14 of which are visible. It was discovered in Western Australia in a tributary of the Gascoyne River by a gold prospector named Mr. Davis, his first name being unknown. Now housed in the Western Australian Museum under the catalogue WAMAG 9080, the fossil was not found in situ, thus its precise stratigraphic origin remains uncertain. In 1884, Irish meteorologist Robert Henry Scott forwarded to British paleontologist Henry Woodward a letter written by a reverend from Fremantle, accompanied by a photograph of the find. Because of its incomplete condition, Woodward identified the fossil as being very similar to those of the cartilaginous fish Edestus, a genus first described by American paleontologist Joseph Leidy in 1855. Wishing to examine the fossil directly, Woodward persuaded Scott to write to his sister, Lady Barker, to obtain the loan of the specimen from the same reverend. After an extended correspondence, Irish geologist Edward Hardman, then on assignment in the Kimberley region, was tasked with bringing the fossil back to England upon his return. In a 1886 publication, Woodward finally described the specimen as representing a new species of Edestus, which he named Edestus davisii in honor of its discoverer.

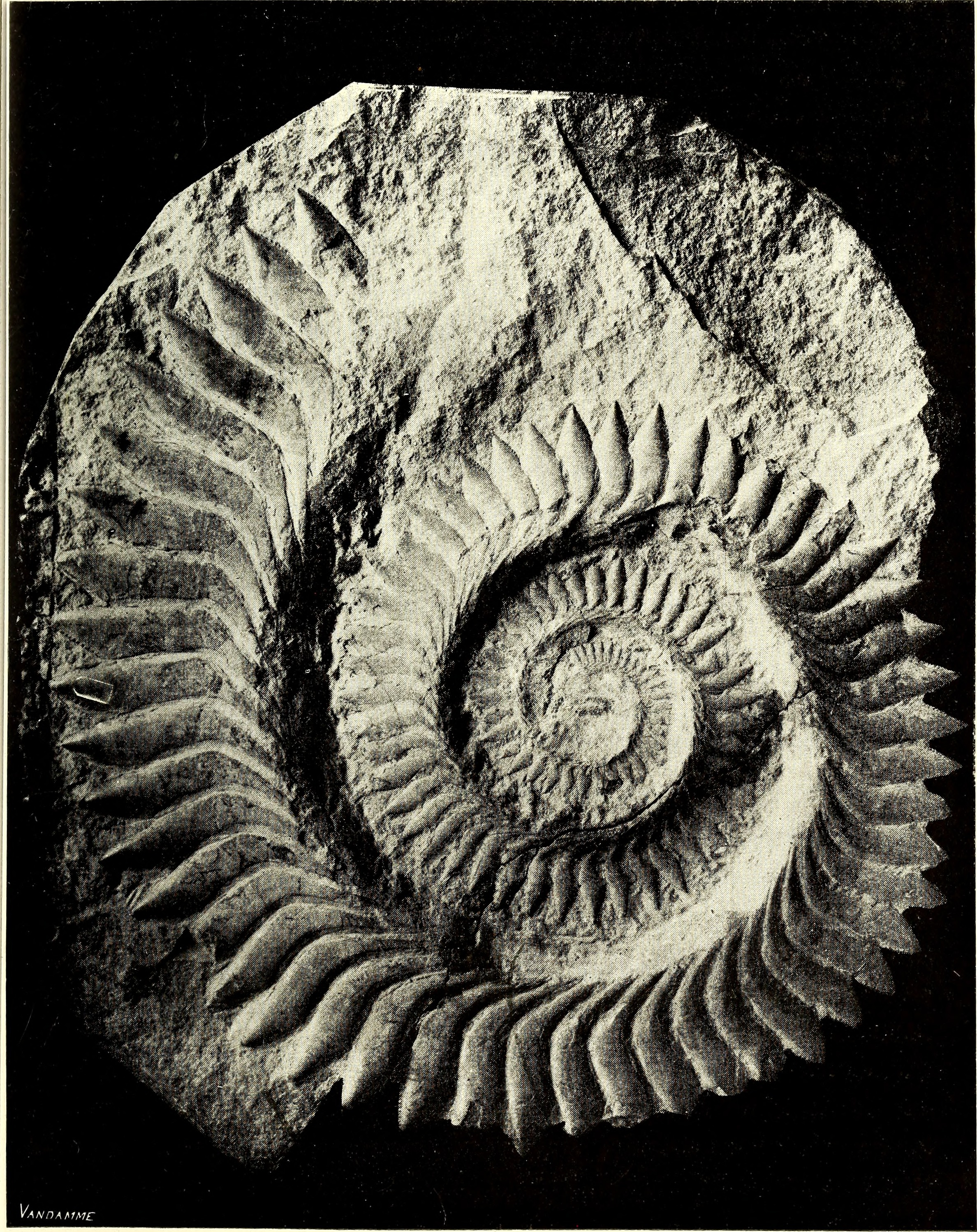
Lectotype tooth whorl of H. bessonowi (TsNIGR 1/1865)

More complete tooth whorls were discovered in the late 19th century by Alexander G. Bessonov of the Russian Academy of Sciences, in a quarry near the town of Krasnoufimsk in Sverdlovsk Oblast. He sent them to geologist Alexander Karpinsky, who first described them in a monograph published in Russian in 1899, followed later that year by a German translation. As the fossils he examined were sufficiently distinct from those of Edestus, Karpinsky assigned them to a new genus, which he named Helicoprion, with H. bessonowi as the type species. The generic name Helicoprion derives from the Ancient Greek ἕλικος (hélikos, "spiral") and πρίων (príōn, "saw"), in reference to the characteristic morphology of the tooth whorls, while the specific epithet bessonowi honors their discoverer. Among the six specimens described by Karpinsky, the most complete of them, later catalogued as TsNIGR 1/1865 in the collections of the Central Research Geological Museum in Saint Petersburg, was designated as the lectotype by Russian paleontologist Dmitry Obruchev in a 1964 publication. This same specimen was stolen in 1998 and was eventually recovered by British paleontologist David J. Ward with the assistance of an anonymous fossil dealer. In his 1899 observations, Karpinsky also noted that the specimen described by Woodward in 1886 showed sufficient similarities with the Krasnoufimsk material to justify its provisional reassignment to Helicoprion, renaming it H. davisii. However, this interpretation was challenged as early as 1902 by American paleontologist Charles R. Eastman, who assigned the species to Campyloprion, a newly erected and closely related taxon. A few years later, in 1909, his colleague Oliver Perry Hay transferred the species once again, this time to Toxoprion, another newly established, related genus. In later publications, Karpinsky reaffirmed the position he had argued in 1899, an interpretation followed by several authors in the subsequent decades. His interpretation was finally confirmed in 1940, when German–American paleontologist Curt Teichert described much more complete fossils of H. davisii, which like the holotype, were also discovered in Western Australia.

Since the genus Helicoprion was established by Karpinsky in 1899, numerous additional species have been described from fossils found across the world, although most originate from North America. In a morphometric revision published in 2013, American paleontologists Leif Tapanila and Jesse Pruitt reassessed all of these historical species assignments. Their analysis showed that, among the roughly 10 named species, only three possess features distinctive enough to be considered valid: H. bessonowi, H. davisii, and H. ergassaminon, with the remaining taxa regarded as either synonymous or doubtful. H. ergassaminon was first described in 1966 by Danish ichthyologist Svend Erik Bendix-Almgreen in a monograph devoted to several Helicoprion fossils housed in the paleontological collections of various universities in Idaho, USA. As with the generic name, the specific epithet derives from the Ancient Greek ἐργασάμενον (ergasamenon (Note: The spelling of this specific epithet varies within Bendix-Almgreen’s original publication, which alternates between ergassaminon and ergasaminon. However, the former spelling appears to be preferred in more recent works.)), meaning "the one who has done work", in reference to the distinctive wear marks observed on the holotype. This latter, nicknamed "Idaho 5" and discovered in a now-abandoned mine near Fort Hall, was reported by Bendix-Almgreen to be stored at the University of Idaho in Moscow, Idaho. However, later searches failed to locate the specimen at that institution, and the fossil was subsequently considered lost. The holotype was finally rediscovered in 2017 during the recataloguing of the fossil collections at the Natural History Museum of Denmark, before being transferred in 2023 to the Idaho State University in Pocatello, where it is now held.

=== Synonymous or doubtful species ===
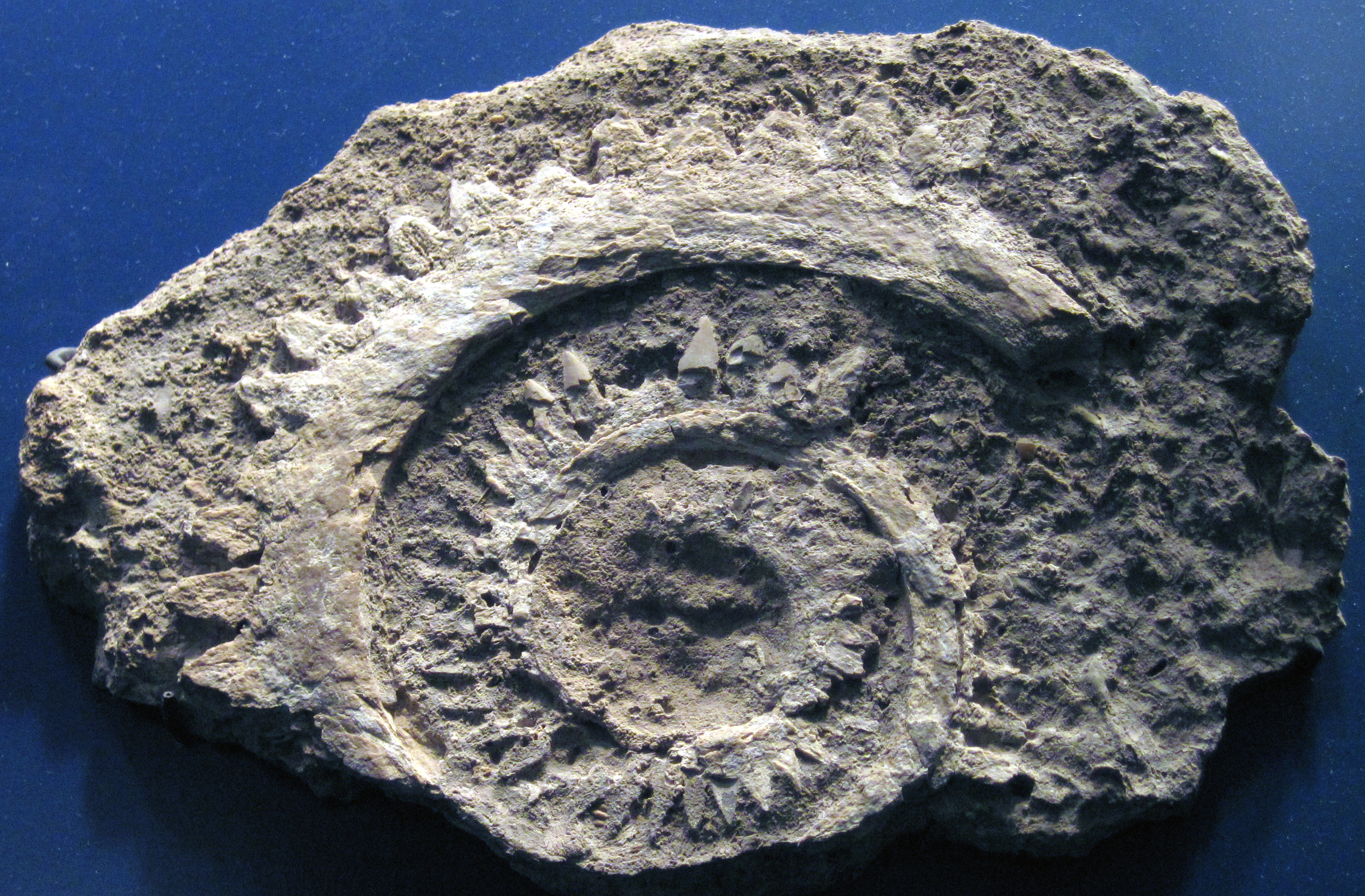
Tooth whorl from Texas formerly attributed to H. ferrieri, a taxon now regarded as a junior synonym of H. davisii

In his 1907 and 1909 works, Hay erected a new genus and species of eugeneodont, Lissoprion ferrieri, which he described from three fossil specimens originating from phosphate deposits along the Idaho–Wyoming border. The holotype consists only of a short series of three teeth, but one of the additional specimens illustrated in 1909 shows at least two tooth rows, leading Karpinsky to reclassify the taxon as H. ferrieri in 1911, while noting its resemblance to H. davisii. For nearly a century, this species was distinguished on the basis of tooth angle and height. However, in their 2013 revision, Tapanila and Pruitt demonstrated that these traits vary naturally within a single Helicoprion species, so regarded H. ferrieri as a junior synonym of H. davisii. In 1939, American geologist Harry E. Wheeler named two additional Helicoprion species, H. sierrensis and H. nevadensis, based on type specimens from California and Nevada, respectively. Wheeler distinguished H. sierrensis by the degree of variation in the shaft of the tooth whorl, whereas H. nevadensis was characterized, in his view, by the expansion pattern of the whorl and tooth height. In their 2013 revision, Tapanila and Pruitt demonstrated that the characters attributed to H. sierrensis fall within the natural range of variation seen in H. davisii, while those of H. nevadensis correspond to the growth stage of H. bessonowi. The two species named by Wheeler were thus synonymized with H. davisii and H. bessonowi.

In 1945, geologist Federico K. G. Müllerried described the species H. mexicanus on the basis of a poorly preserved partial tooth whorl bearing 10 teeth, discovered in the Mexican state of Coahuila. The author distinguished the taxon by the ornamentation of its teeth. Although the holotype of this species has since been reported lost, Tapanila and Pruitt noted that its anatomy closely resembles that of the largest known Helicoprion specimen. Nevertheless, neither specimen can be assigned to any of the three recognised species due to their incomplete preservation. Consequently, in the absence of more complete material attributable to the taxon, H. mexicanus is regarded as a nomen dubium. In 1953, Obruchev illustrated in his monograph a poorly preserved fossil specimen preserving the impression and root of two teeth, discovered in the Ural Mountains of Russia. Contrary to ICZN requirements, though, the author provided no diagnosis establishing the distinctiveness of the taxon. As the specimen is also considered lost, Tapanila and Pruitt classified this species as a nomen nudum. In 1970, Polish geologist Stanisław Siedlecki named the species H. svalis on the basis of isolated teeth and fragmentary tooth whorls recovered from the Norwegian archipelago of Svalbard. From the type specimen, he distinguished the taxon by the relative narrowness of the teeth, which appeared not to contact one another. Tapanila and Pruitt interpreted these observations as an artefact of the holotype’s partial preservation, since only the central portions of its teeth are preserved. The authors of the 2013 revision considered H. svalis to be strongly similar to H. bessonowi, but could not formally synonymise the two due to the incompleteness of the fossil material, so regarded it as a doubtful taxon.

In 2007, palaeontologist Xiao Hong Chen and colleagues described the species H. jingmenense from an almost complete tooth whorl discovered during road construction in Hubei Province, China. Although the authors noted close similarities to H. bessonowi and H. ferrieri, they distinguished their species from the former by having fewer than 39 teeth per volution, and from the latter by possessing broader cutting edges and a shorter compound root. In their 2013 revision, though, Tapanila and Pruitt pointed out that the specimen is partially obscured by its surrounding matrix, which likely led to an underestimation of tooth height. Taking this into account, along with intraspecific variation, they regarded H. jingmenense as a junior synonym of H. davisii.

=== Formerly assigned species ===
In 1903, shortly after establishing Campyloprion with C. annectans as its type species, Eastman apparently concluded that this taxon was sufficiently similar to Helicoprion to be reassigned as a distinct lineage within that genus. Despite this, he apparently retained the name Campyloprion by designating C. lecontei, previously placed in Edestus, as a replacement type species. This interpretation was criticised by Hay in his 1907 and 1909 works: according to him, if C. annectans were indeed to be transferred to Helicoprion, then the genus name Campyloprion should be synonymised, and the two remaining species formerly placed in that genus —C. lecontei and C. davisii— should receive a new generic name in accordance with nomenclatural rules. In his 1909 publication, Hay kept Helicoprion and Campyloprion separate, but nevertheless reassigned C. lecontei and C. davisii to the newly erected genus Toxoprion, with the former designated as its type species. While C. davisii has since been reassigned to Helicoprion, American paleontologists Wayne M. Itano and Spencer G. Lucas argued in 2018 that T. lecontei may not represent a distinct genus, suggesting that it may actually belong to Campyloprion. Nevertheless, the authors retained Toxoprion as a nominal genus pending further information.

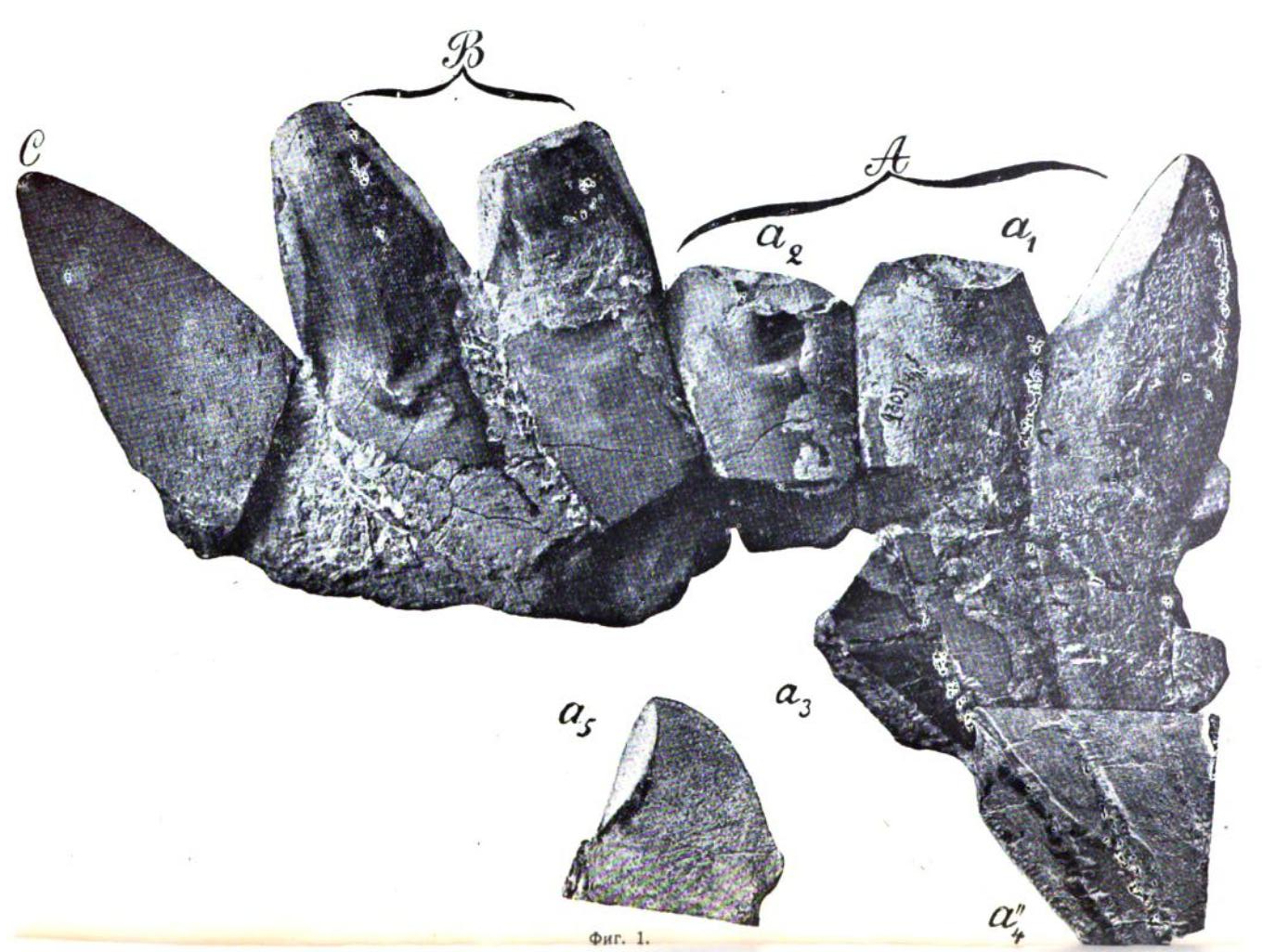
Partial tooth whorl of Parahelicoprion clerci, which was originally assigned to Helicoprion

In 1916, Karpinsky erected the species H. clerci on the basis of fragmentary remains of a large tooth whorl discovered near Krasnoufimsk, the same locality that yielded the original fossils of H. bessonowi. In his description, however, he noted that the taxon might be sufficiently distinct to warrant its own genus. He formalised this proposal in 1924 by transferring the species to the genus Parahelicoprion, a name he had already used informally in several earlier publications. In 1986, the Bolivian geologist Dagmar Merino-Rodo and the French paleontologist Philippe Janvier described a second species, P. mariosuarezi, based on fossils unearthed near La Paz, Bolivia. In the same publication, however, the authors were the first to question the taxonomic status of the genus, noting the likely absence of clearly defined autapomorphies. This cast doubt on the monophyly of Parahelicoprion and complicated the assignment of additional species. In 2018 and 2023, Russian palaeontologists Sergey V. Naugolnykh and Dmitry V. Naumkin proposed that Parahelicoprion may, in fact, represent a junior synonym of Helicoprion, suggesting that the genus may have been named on the basis of fossils belonging to exceptionally large and old individuals of the latter. Other authors have continued to consider the genus to be distinct from Helicoprion.

In 1922, Karpinsky erected another species of Helicoprion, H. ivanovi, based on fossils discovered at a locality near Moscow. In 1964, Obruchev reassigned this species to the related genus Campyloprion on account of anatomical similarities shared with C. annectans, an interpretation followed in subsequent studies. However, in 2022, Russian palaeontologist Oleg Lebedev and colleagues once again reclassified the species into its own genus, which they named Karpinskiprion.

== Description ==
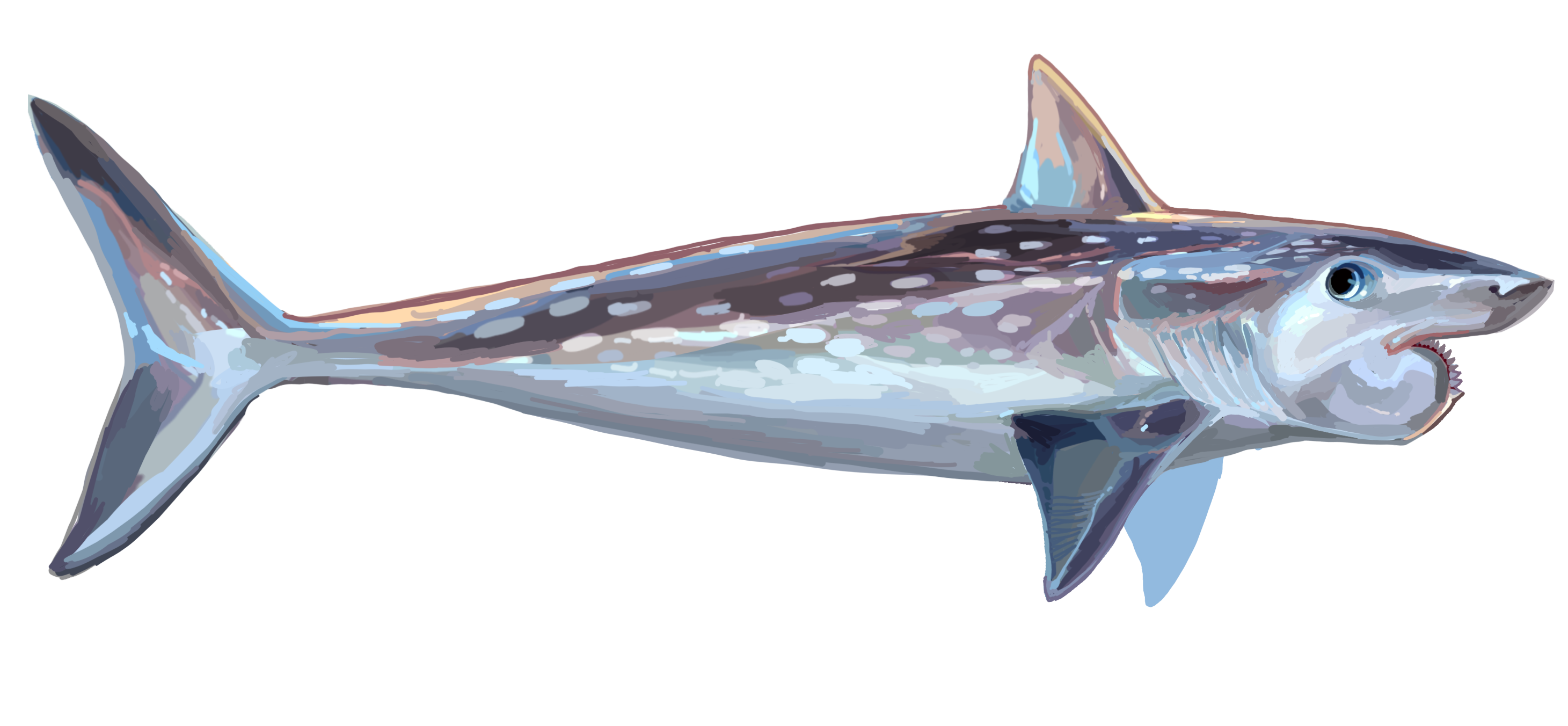
Life restoration of H. davisii.

Like other chondrichthyan fish, Helicoprion had a skeleton made of cartilage. Around the jaws, this cartilage was mineralized, but the rest of the skeleton was likely completely unmineralized and quickly disintegrated once it began to decay. The exact in-life appearance of Helicoprion is unknown, but the body shape has been estimated from postcranial remains known from other members of its order, such as the Pennsylvanian to Triassic-age caseodontid eugeneodonts Caseodus, Fadenia, and Romerodus. Eugeneodonts are characterized by a fusiform (streamlined, torpedo-shaped) body plan, with triangular pectoral fins. They have a single large and triangular dorsal fin without a fin spine, and a tall, forked caudal fin, which externally appears to be homocercal (with two equally sized lobes). This general body plan is shared by active, open-water predatory fish such as tuna, swordfish, and lamnid sharks. Eugeneodonts also lack pelvic and anal fins, and the genus Romerodus had broad keels along the side of the body up to the caudal fin. Fadenia and the smaller Ornithoprion had at least five well-developed gill slits, possibly with a vestigial sixth gill. No evidence has been found of the specialized gill basket and fleshy operculum present in living chimaeroids.

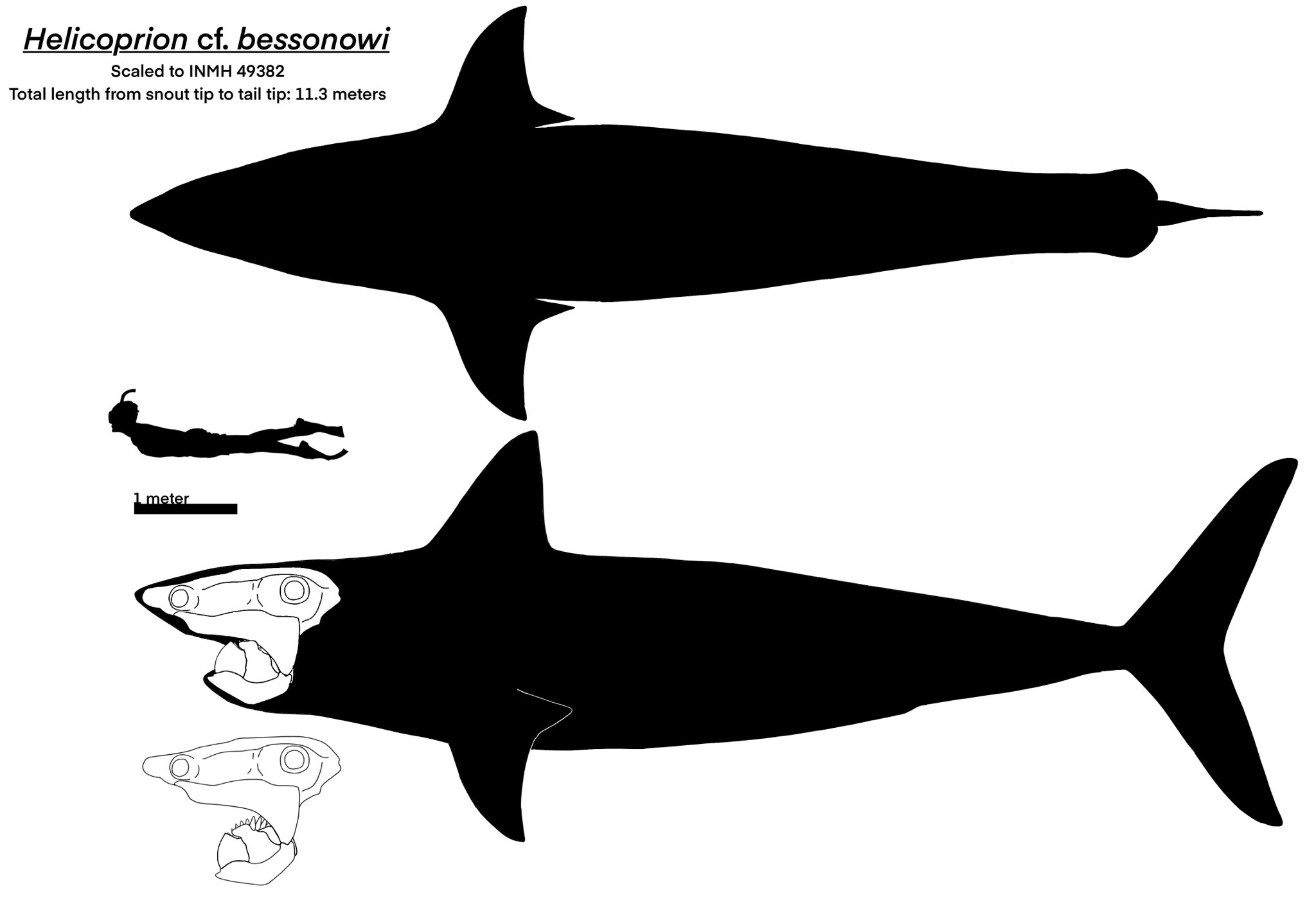
Estimated size of exceptionally large Helicoprion, with a speculative skull shape and body outline

Based on the proportional size of caseodontoid tooth whorls, Lebedev suggested in 2009 that Helicoprion individuals with tooth whorls 35–40 cm (14–16 in) in diameter could reach 5–8 m (16–26 ft) in total length, comparable to the size of modern basking sharks. The largest known Helicoprion tooth whorl, specimen IMNH 49382, reached 56 cm (22 in) in diameter and 14 cm (5.5 in) in crown height, and would have belonged to an individual 7 m (23 ft) or more in length. Tapanila has suggested a total length of 9.7–12 m (32–39 ft) for the largest Helicoprion individuals.

=== Tooth whorl ===
Diagram of the teeth within the spiral

Almost all Helicoprion specimens are known solely from "tooth whorls", which consist of dozens of enameloid-covered teeth embedded within a single logarithmic spiral-shaped root. The youngest and first teeth at the center of the spiral, referred to as the "juvenile tooth arch", are hooked, but all other teeth are generally triangular in shape, laterally compressed, and typically serrated. Tooth size increases away from the center of the spiral, with the largest teeth possibly exceeding 10 cm (3.9 in) in height. The lower parts of the teeth form projections below the crown of the previous tooth. The lowest portion of the root below the enameloid tooth projections is referred to as the "shaft", and lies on jaw cartilage that covers the previous revolutions of the whorl. In a complete tooth whorl, the outermost part of the spiral terminates with an extended section of shaft that lacks the middle and upper portions of the tooth crown.

The three species of Helicoprion differ only in the anatomy of their tooth whorls. Each species is differentiated by features of the upper, middle, and lower sections of the tooth crowns, which are apparent only after the 85th tooth of the spiral. H. davisii can be differentiated from other Helicoprion species by tall, widely spaced tooth crowns with forward-curved tooth tips. H. bessonowi had comparatively short, closely spaced tooth crowns, backward-curved teeth, a narrow shaft, and widely angled tooth bases. H. ergassaminon is roughly intermediate in anatomy between H. bessonowi and H. davisii, with tall but closely spaced crowns and tooth bases angled similarly to H. davisii.

=== Jaws ===
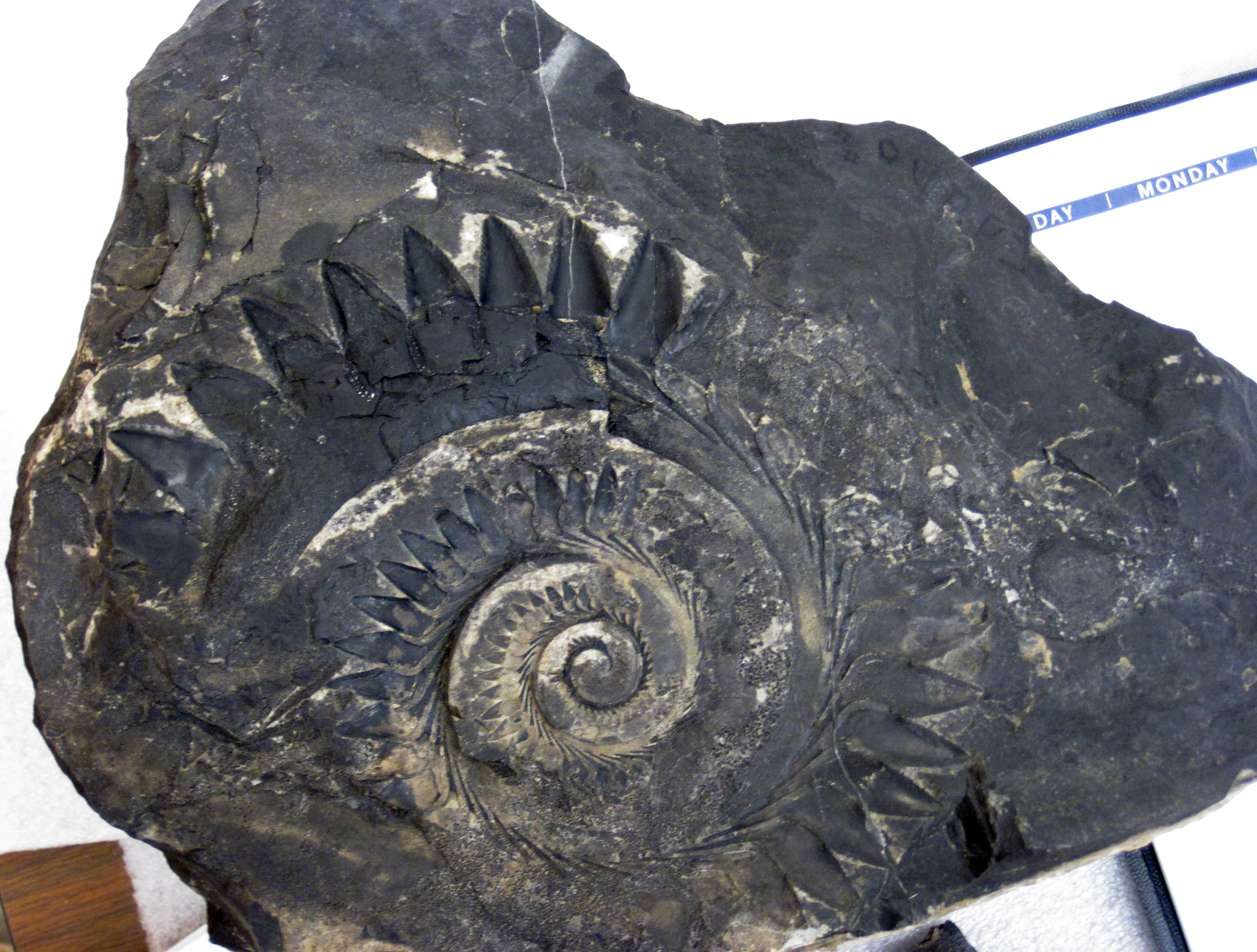
"Idaho 4" (IMNH 37899), a tooth whorl of H. davisii from the Phosphoria Formation being notable for preserving the articulated jaw cartilages

Helicoprion fossils preserving more than tooth whorls are rare. The best-preserved specimen is an H. davisii numbered as IMNH 37899 (nicknamed "Idaho 4"), discovered in 1950 in a mine near Montpelier, Idaho, and initially described as an H. ferrieri by Bendix-Almgreen in his 1966 monograph. Preserving cartilaginous elements, the specimen later became the subject of a detailed study in 2013 by Tapanila and colleagues, who used CT scans to closely examine its anatomy. CT scanning revealed a nearly complete set of upper and lower jaws, still in articulation and preserved in three dimensions. Alongside the tooth whorl, the specimen preserves the palatoquadrates (forming the upper jaw), Meckel's cartilages (forming the lower jaw), and a robust block of cartilage bracing the tooth whorl, which has been identified as labial cartilage. All of these structures are mineralized and covered in prismatic, calcified cartilage, as in modern cartilaginous fish. The specimen does not preserve a chondrocranium, the cartilaginous structure that would have housed the brain and sensory organs. The jaws are extensively laterally compressed (narrow) compared to living chondrichthyans, though this may at least partially be an artifact of compression after death.

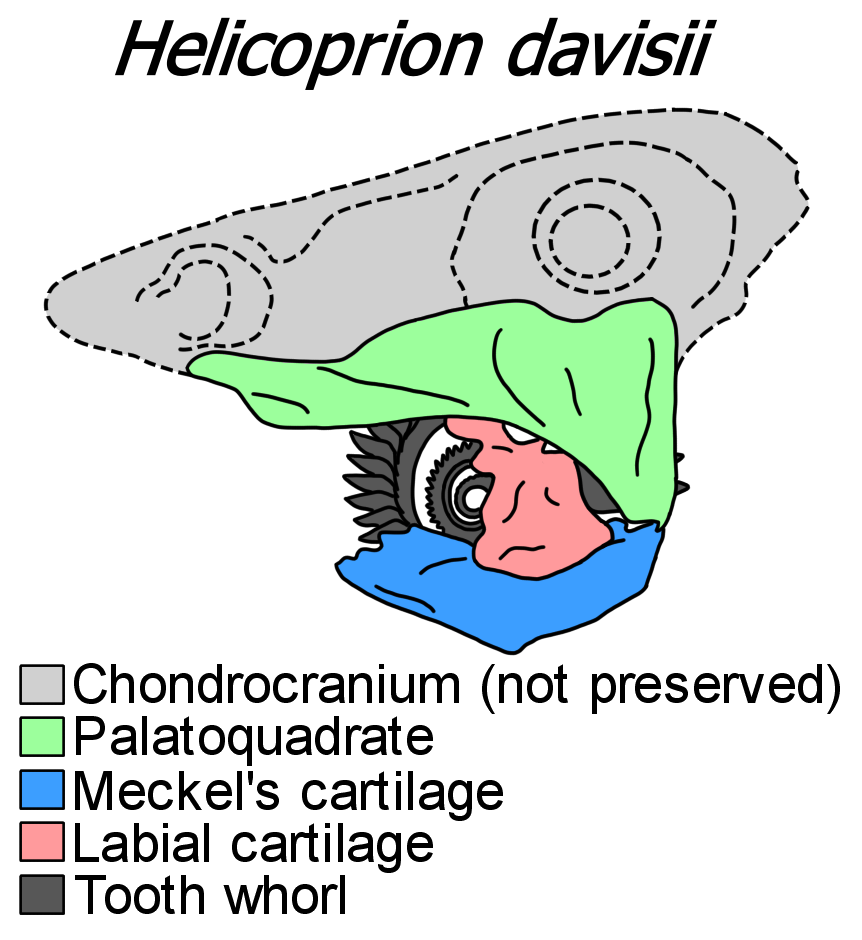
Skull restoration of H. davisii based after "Idaho 4"

Helicoprion had an autodiastylic jaw suspension, meaning that the inner edge of the palatoquadrate was firmly attached (but not fused) to the chondrocranium at two separate points. These two attachment points are the dome-shaped ethmoid process at the front of the palatoquadrate, and the flange-like basal process at its upper rear corner. Autodiastylic jaws are common in early holocephalans, though in modern animals, they can only be found in embryonic chimaeriforms. Another well-preserved specimen of H. davisii, USNM 22577+494391 (nicknamed the "Sweetwood specimen"), has demonstrated that the inner surface of the palatoquadrate was covered with numerous small (~2 mm wide) teeth. The palatoquadrate teeth were low and rounded, forming a "pavement" that scraped against the tooth whorl. When seen from behind, the palatoquadrate forms a paired jaw joint with the Meckel's cartilage. No evidence is seen for articulation between the jaws and the hyomandibula, which helps to suspend the jaws of modern sharks.

The Meckel's cartilage of Helicoprion has an additional projection right before the joint with the palatoquadrate. This extra process, unique to Helicoprion, likely served to limit jaw closure to prevent the whorl from puncturing the skull. Another unique characteristic of Helicoprion is that the preserved labial cartilage forms a synchondrosis (fused joint) with the upper surface of Meckel's cartilage. This joint is facilitated by a long facet on the upper edge of Meckel's cartilage. The labial cartilage provides lateral support for the tooth whorl, widening near the root of each revolution. By wedging into the palatoquadrate while the mouth is closed, the upper edge of the labial cartilage helps to spread out the forces used to limit the extent of the jaw closure. The rear portion of the labial cartilage has a cup-like form, protecting the developing root of the last and youngest revolution of the tooth-whorl.

=== Scales ===
Tooth-like chondrichthyan scales, specifically known as odontodes, have been found associated with H. bessonowi remains in Kazakhstan. They are broadly similar to scales of other eugeneodonts such as Sarcoprion and Ornithoprion. The scales have a cap-shaped base with a concave lower surface. The crowns are conical and covered with serrated, longitudinal ridges. The scales may be monodontode (with one crown per base) or polyodontode (with multiple crowns extending from a single base). Compared to other eugeneodonts, the scales of Helicoprion are more strongly pointed.

== Classification ==
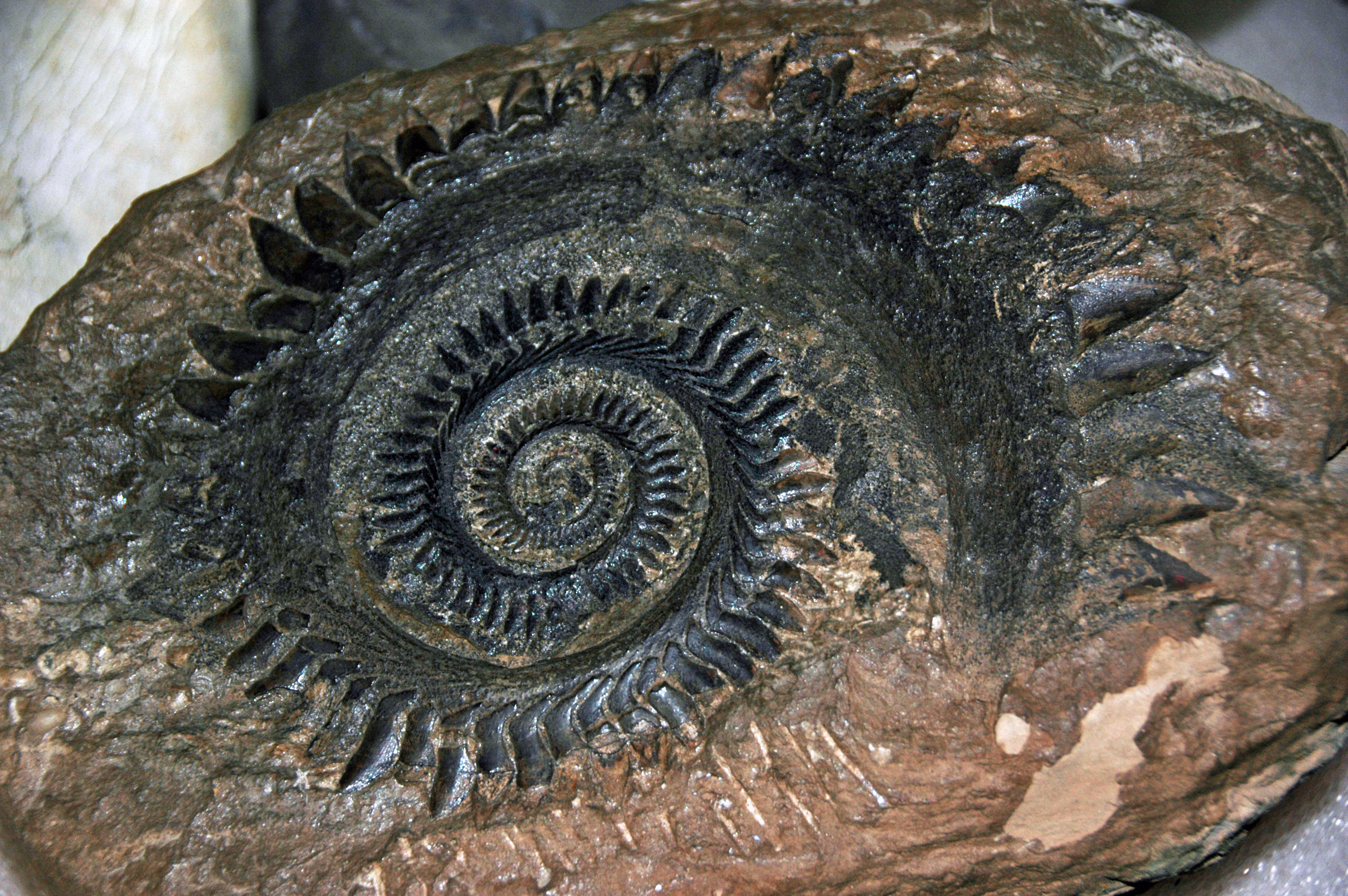
Tooth whorl of H. ergassaminon on display at the Idaho Museum of Natural History in Pocatello

Skull data from IMNH 37899 reveal several characteristics, such as an autodiastylic (two-jointed) jaw suspension with a nonsuspensory hyomandibula, which confirm the placement of Helicoprion within the chondrichthyan subclass Holocephali (or the more broadly defined Euchondrocephali). Holocephalans are primarily an extinct group, and the only extant representatives of the group are the specialized, deep-sea Chimaeriformes (also called ratfish). The relationship between Helicoprion and living chimaeras is very distant, but had been previously suspected based on details of its tooth anatomy.

Helicoprion can be characterized as a member of Eugeneodontiformes, an order of holocephalans that lived from the Devonian to Triassic periods and are defined by their tooth whorls along the midline of the jaw and autodiastylic skulls. Within the Eugeneodontiformes, Helicoprion is placed within the Edestoidea, a group of eugeneodonts with particularly tall and angled symphyseal teeth. Members of the Edestoidea are divided into two families based on the style of the dentition. One family, the Edestidae, has relatively short tooth blades with roots that incline backwards. The other family is the Helicoprionidae, of which Helicoprion is the type genus. Members of this family are distinguished by their large, strongly arched tooth whorls supported by cartilage, which do not replace teeth, but instead add new ones continuously at the apex of the spiral, with tooth bases inclined forward. This family was often referred to as the Agassizodontidae in older literature, but the name Helicoprionidae has priority under nomenclatural rules, having been established 70 years earlier. Helicoprion is unique among members of its family in possessing a closed (complete) spiral whorl, which revolves around itself multiple times, while the tooth whorls of other genera form an incomplete, open spiral. As most eugeneodonts are based on fragmentary tooth remains, relationships within the group remain unclear. A cladogram illustrating the group's possible relations, drawn from Rainer Zangerl's 1981 volume of the Handbook of Paleoichthyology, is provided below.

- Eugeneodontida (=Eugeneodontiformes)
  - Caseodontoidea (=Eugeneodontoidei)
    - Caseodontidae
      - - - Fadenia
          - Erikodus
        - Ornithoprion
      - - Caseodus
        - Romerodus
    - Eugeneodontidae
      - Bobbodus
      - - Eugeneodus
        - Gilliodus
  - Edestoidea
    - - Agassizodontidae (=Helicoprionidae)
        - - - Campyloprion
            - Parahelicoprion
          - Helicoprion
        - - Agassizodus
          - - Toxoprion
            - Sarcoprion
    - Edestidae
      - - Syntomodus
        - - Lestrodus
          - Edestus
        - - Helicampodus
          - Parahelicampodus

== Paleobiology ==
=== Whorl function ===
Cross-section of the jaw of Helicoprion: Interior revolutions of the whorl not shown

Due to the narrow nature of Helicoprion's jaws, suction feeding is unlikely to have been effective, and Helicoprion is thought to have been a bite feeder. Biomechanical modelling in a 2015 paper by American biologist Jason B. Ramsay and colleagues suggests that the teeth in the whorl had distinct functions depending on where they were in the spiral. The foremost teeth served to snag and pull prey further into the mouth, while the middle teeth speared, and the hind teeth punctured and brought prey further into the throat. The prey would be squeezed between the whorl and the palatoquadrates during feeding. The labial cartilage served to provide support for the whorl. The unusual, saw-like tooth whorl and the lack of wear on the teeth of Helicoprion implies a diet of soft-bodied prey, as hard-shelled prey would simply slip out of the mouth.

Jaw motion of Helicoprion after Ramsay et al. (2015)

Helicoprion may have started with a wide gape during prey capture, followed by smaller jaw opening and closing cycles to further transport prey into the mouth as is done by modern bite-feeding sharks. While modern sharks shake their heads from side to side to facilitate sawing and cutting their prey, the teeth of Helicoprion would likely further cut the prey during the jaw opening, due to the arc-like path of the front teeth. Helicoprion likely used a series of rapid, forceful jaw closures to initially capture and push prey deeper into the mouth, followed by repeated opening and closing of the jaw to saw through prey.

Ramsay and colleagues further suggested that the whorl could have served as an effective mechanism for shelling hard-shelled cephalopods such as ammonoids and nautiloids, which were abundant in Early Permian oceans. If a hard-shelled cephalopod were to be bitten head-on, the whorl could have served to pull the soft body out of the shell and into the mouth. As the jaw closed, the palatoquadrates and tooth whorl combined to form a three-point system, equivalent to the set-up of an inverted three-point flexural test. This system was effective at trapping and holding soft parts to increase cutting efficiency and provide leverage against shelled prey. At the three points of contact, the estimated bite force ranges between 1,192 and 2,391 newtons (268 and 538 lb_{f}), with estimated bite stresses ranging from 397 to 797 million N/m^{2} (57,600 to 115,600 psi) during prey contact. Due to its high bite force, Helicoprion may have also been able to eat vertebrates, in addition to cephalopods.

=== Historical whorl reconstructions ===
==== Initial reconstructions ====
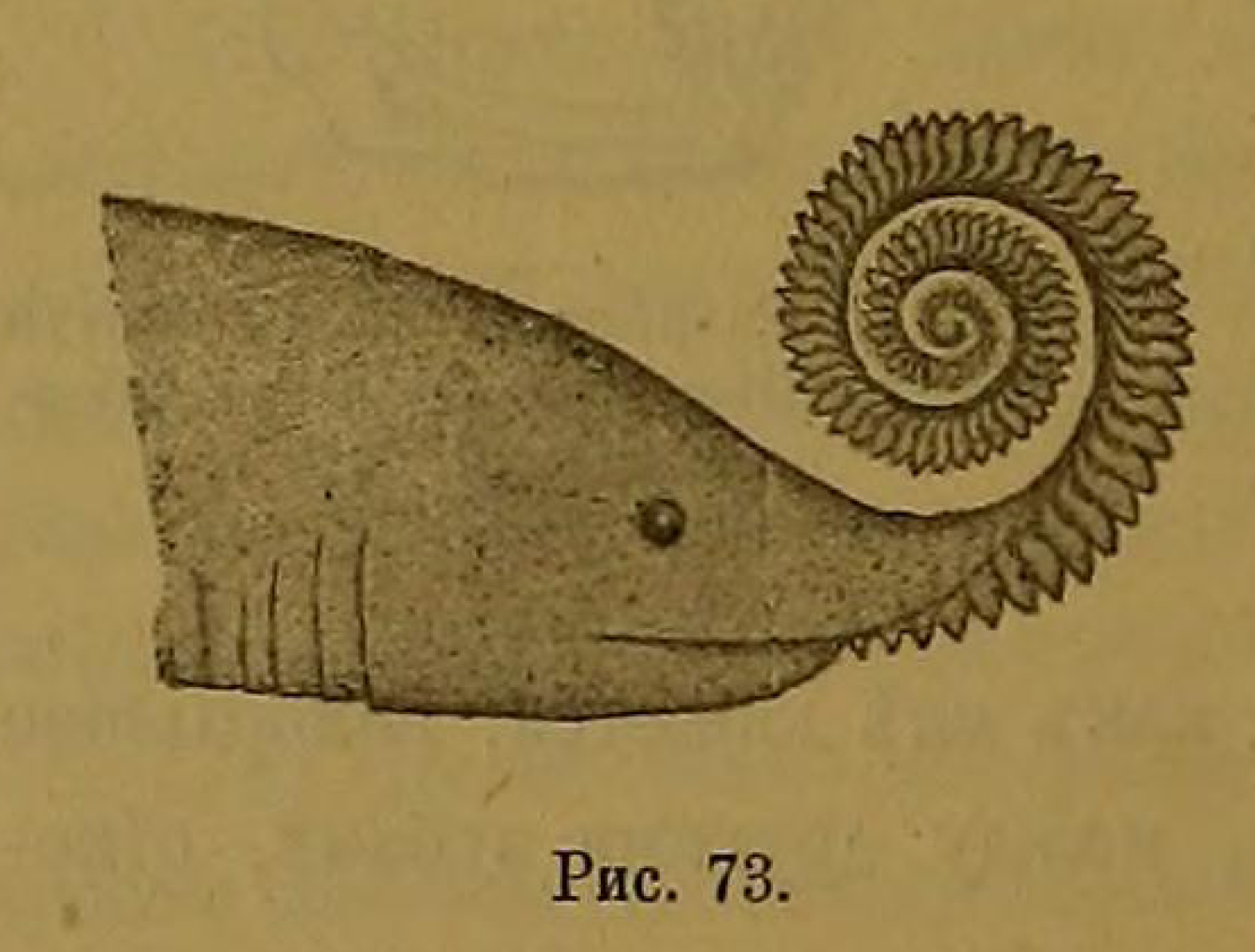
Karpinsky's 1899 first hypothesis of the placement of the tooth whorl on H. bessonowi.

Hypotheses for the placement and identity of Helicoprion's tooth whorls were controversial since it was first discovered. In his original 1886 description of H. davisii, then assigned to Edestus, Woodward discussed the various interpretations that had been proposed regarding the nature of the fossils placed in that genus. Leidy, who had originally described Edestus in 1855, argued that the fossils represented the jaws of chondrichthyan fishes. The British paleontologist William Davies agreed this view and compared the material specifically to the jaws of Janassa bituminosa, another Permian holocephalan belonging to the likewise extinct petalodonts. In contrast, the American paleontologist John Strong Newberry suggested that these jaw-like structures were defensive spines of a stingray-like fish. Woodward ultimately adopted the hypothesis proposed by the American paleontologist Edward Drinker Cope, who interpreted the fossils as pectoral fin spines belonging to fishes comparable to Pelecopterus (now known as Protosphyraena, then sometimes placed within Ptychodus). When Karpinsky erected the genus Helicoprion in 1899, he emphasized that the peculiar nature of the tooth whorl made it difficult to draw precise conclusions about its function. He cautiously suggested that it may have curled forward from the upper jaw for defensive or offensive purposes, an idea supported by comparison with the upper dental blades of Edestus, which by 1899 had been re-evaluated as structures belonging to the jaw.

Debates over the identity of Helicoprion's tooth whorl continued in the years following Karpinsky's monograph. In 1900, the publication was reviewed by Eastman, who appreciated the paper as a whole, but derided the sketch of the supposed life position of the whorl. Though Eastman admitted that the teeth of the whorl were very similar to those of other chondrichthyans, he still supported the idea that the whorl may have been a defensive structure embedded into the body of the animal, rather than the mouth. Shortly after his initial monograph, Karpinsky published a new argument suggesting that the whorl represented a curved, plate-covered tail resembling that of seahorses. This proposal was immediately criticized by several researchers. The Belgian paleontologist Ernest Van Den Broeck emphasized the fragility of the structure and argued that it would be better protected if it were a paired oral apparatus located within the animal's cheeks. The British paleoichthyologist Arthur Smith Woodward expanded on this idea and proposed that each whorl represented a dental battery belonging to a large shark. The Belgian paleontologist Gustave Simoens illustrated Karpinsky’s various hypotheses and, drawing on histological data, asserted with certainty that the whorls were tooth-bearing structures located within the mouth. In 1911, Karpinsky depicted the whorls as components of the dorsal fins. Reconstructions similar to those proposed by Karpinsky in 1899 continued to appear in Russian publications and textbooks as late as 2001.

==== Later reconstructions ====
Tiere der Urwelt trading card featuring Helicoprion with the whorl in the lower jaw, alongside Xenacanthus

By the mid-20th century, the tooth whorl was generally accepted to be positioned in the lower jaw. Though this general position was suspected almost immediately in the aftermath of Karpinsky's monograph, it was not illustrated as such until the mid-1900s. Around that time, an artist known only as "F. John" depicted Helicoprion within a set of "Tiere der Urwelt" trading cards. His reconstruction presented the tooth whorl as an external structure curling down from the lower jaw of the animal. Similar downward-curling reconstructions have also been created by modern paleontologists and artists such as the australian John A. Long and the americans Todd Marshall and Karen Carr. The utility of the tooth whorl in this type of reconstruction was inferred based on sawfish, which incapacitate prey using lateral blows of their denticle-covered snouts.

In his 1966 publication, Bendix-Almgreen reinterpreted the tooth whorl of Helicoprion as a symphyseal structure wedged between the meckelian cartilages, which were separated by a gap at the front. A pair of cartilage loops, the symphyseal crista, seems to develop as a paired extension of the jaw symphysis where the meckelian cartilages meet at the back of the jaw. Each loop arches up before curling back inwards, tracing over the root of the tooth whorl. The largest and youngest teeth form at the symphysis near the back of the jaw. Over time, they are carried along the symphyseal crista, spiraling forwards, then downwards and inwards. The series of teeth accumulates into a spiraling structure, which is housed within the cavity defined by the symphyseal crista. The lateral and lower edges of the tooth whorl would have been obscured by skin during life. According to Bendix-Almgreen, the most likely use of the tooth whorl was as a tool for tearing and cutting prey against the upper jaw.

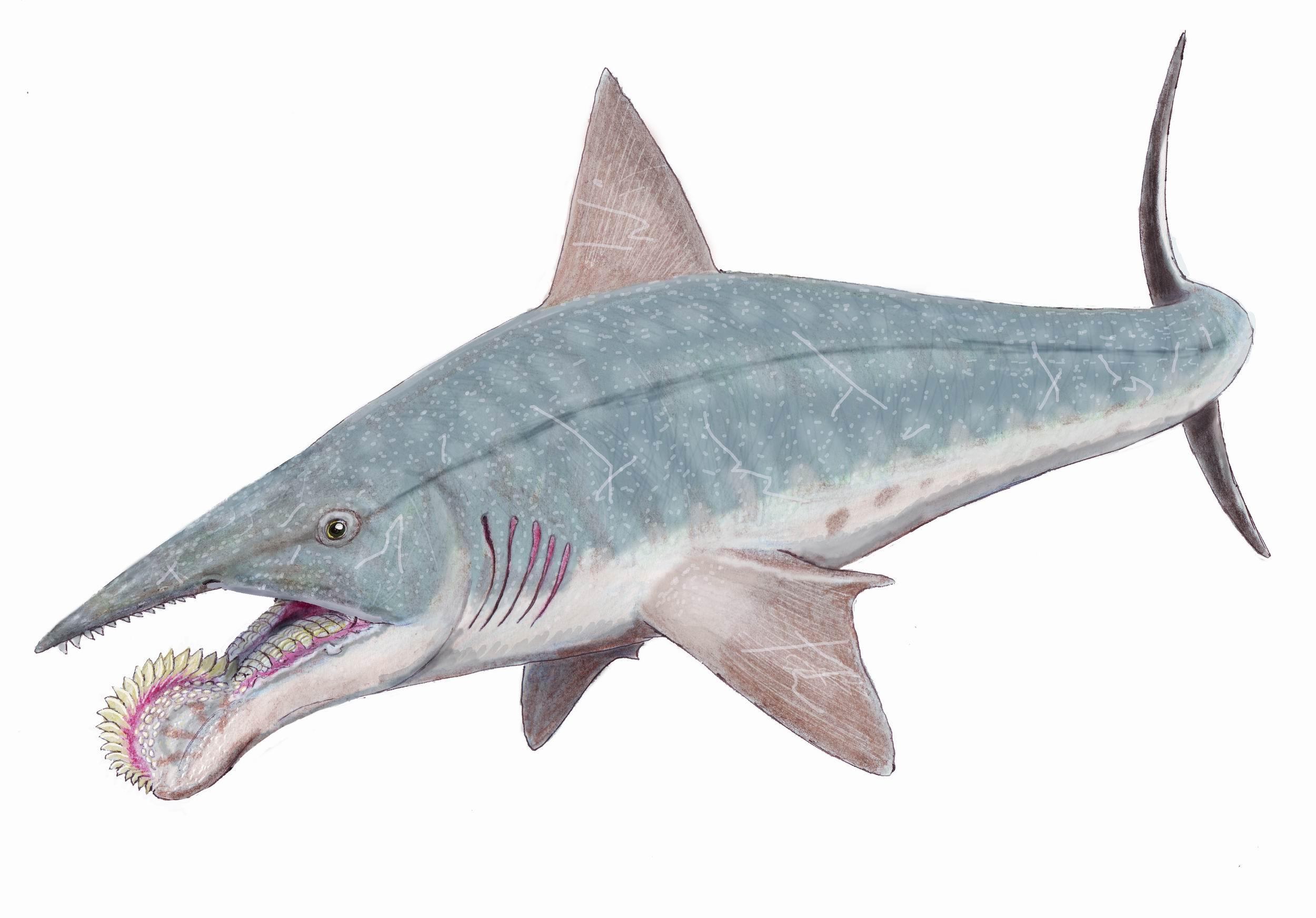
Outdated illustration of an H. bessonowi based on the hypothesis of a prognathous lower jaw proposed by Janvier in 1996

In a 1994 book, the American authors Brad Matsen and Ray Troll described and illustrated a reconstruction based on observations given by Bendix-Almgreen. They proposed that the animal had no teeth in the upper jaw, except for crushing teeth for the whorl to cut against. The authors envisioned the living animal with a very long and narrow skull, forming an elongated snout reminiscent of that of the modern-day goblin shark. In a 1996 textbook, Janvier presented a similar reconstruction, albeit with sharp teeth at the front of the upper jaw and rows of low crushing teeth in the back of the jaw.

In 2008, American paleoartist Mary Parrish created a new reconstruction for the renovated Ocean Hall at the Smithsonian Museum of Natural History. Designed under the guidance of American researchers Robert W. Purdy, Victor Springer, and Matthew Carrano, Parrish's reconstruction places the whorl deeper within the throat. This hypothesis was justified by the argument that the teeth supposedly had no wear marks, and the assumption that the whorl would have created a drag-inducing bulge on the chin of the animal if located in a symphyseal position. They envisioned the tooth whorl as a structure derived from throat denticles and designed to assist swallowing. This would hypothetically negate the disadvantages the tooth whorl would produce if positioned further forward in the jaw. This reconstruction was criticized for the overly intricate and potentially ineffective design of such a structure, if solely used to assist swallowing.

In 2009, Lebedev provided further support for a reconstruction similar to those proposed by Bendix-Almgreen (1966). An H. bessonowi tooth whorl found in Kazakhstan preserved radial scratch marks; the whorl was also found near several wide, tuberculated teeth similar to those of the eugeneodont Campodus. Lebedev's reconstruction presented a cartilage-protected tooth whorl in a symphysial position at the front of the long lower jaw. When the mouth was closed, the tooth whorl would fit into a deep longitudinal pocket on the upper jaw. Both the pocket in the upper jaw and the edges of the lower jaw would have been lined with dense rows of Campodus-like teeth. This was similar to the situation reported in related helicoprionids such as Sarcoprion and Agassizodus. As for Helicoprion's ecology, it was compared to modern cetaceans such as Physeter (the sperm whale), Kogia (dwarf and pygmy sperm whales), Grampus (Risso's dolphin), and Ziphius (Cuvier's beaked whale). These fish-and squid-eating mammals (ichthyoteuthophage) have reduced dentition, often restricted to the tip of the lower jaw. Lebedev's reconstruction approximates modern views on Helicoprion's anatomy, though the hypothetical long jaw has been superseded by CT data since 2013.

== Paleoecology ==
Although the precise stratigraphic level of some specimens remains unknown, the genus Helicoprion is recorded over a span of roughly 20 million years during the Permian, from the Artinskian stage of the Cisuralian to the Roadian of the Guadalupian, i.e. approximately between 290 and 270 million years ago. More than half of the fossils assigned to the genus belong to H. davisii, primarily recovered from the Phosphoria Formation in Idaho. Approximately 25% represent H. bessonowi, known from the Divya Formation in the Ural Mountains of Russia. Other specimens come from more geographically dispersed deposits worldwide, including additional U.S. states as well as Australia, Canada, China, Kazakhstan, Japan, Laos, Mexico, and Norway. The wide geographic distribution of Helicoprion suggests it was a pelagic animal which may only have migrated into shallower waters periodically. During the Artinskian the Phosphoria Formation represented a deep inland sea with an anoxic, muddy bottom. Based on the large number of Helicoprion specimens discovered in the formation, the Phosphoria Sea may have been either a nursery habitat for breeding Helicoprion, or potentially a hunting ground. Helicoprion is believed to have been the apex predator of its environment. The genus' diet likely consisted primarily of cephalopods such as belemnoids, nautiloids and ammonoids, and it also may have hunted cartilaginous and unarmored bony fish as well. Naugolnykh has suggested that, in addition to nektonic cephalopods, Helicoprion fed on benthic invertebrates such as annelid worms caght on the seabed.

== Extinction ==
The disappearance of Helicoprion is not associated with a larger extinction event, and has been suggested to have been a background extinction. Because of its highly specialized feeding mechanism and large size, Helicoprion would have been particularly vulnerable to environmental or ecological changes, although the exact reason the genus died out is unknown.
