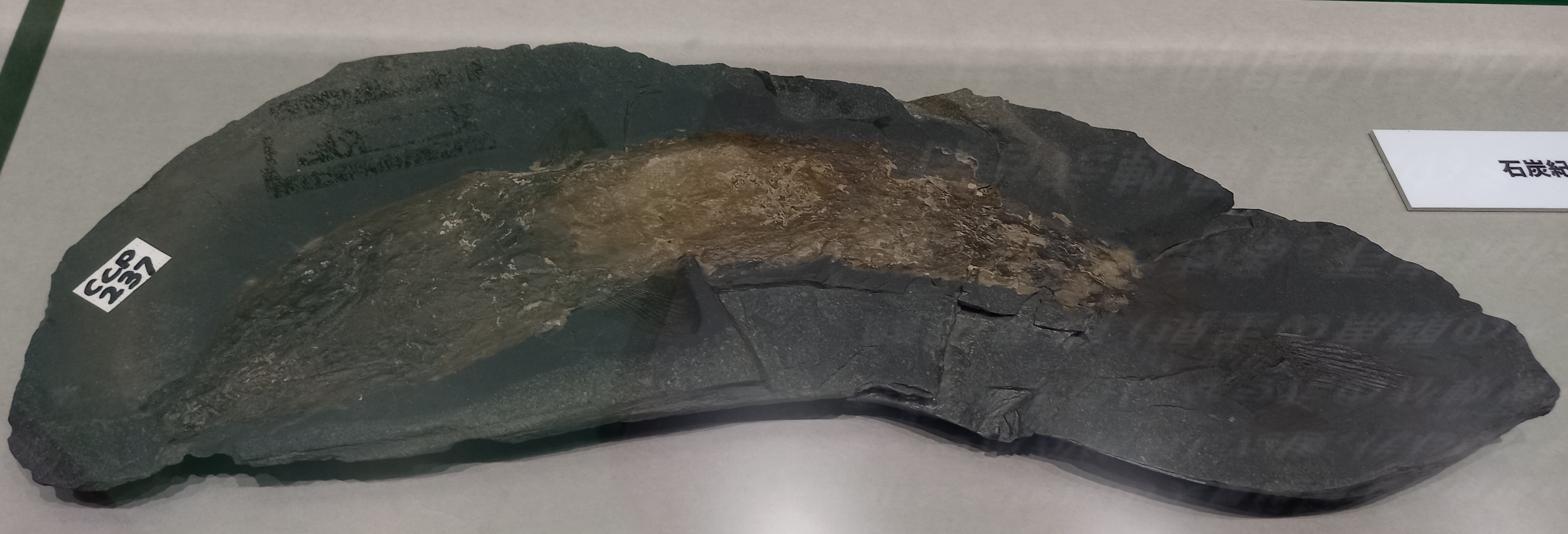
- Body fossil of Romerodus orodontus displayed at the Nagoya City Science Museum

Scientific classification
- Kingdom: Animalia
- Phylum: Chordata
- Class: Chondrichthyes
- Subclass: Holocephali
- Order: †Eugeneodontiformes
- Family: †Caseodontidae
- Genus: †Romerodus; Zangerl, 1981

Type species
- Romerodus orodontus Zangerl, 1981

= Romerodus =

Romerodus Temporal range: Pennsylvanian Moscovian–Kasimovian Possible Early Permian record

Extinct genus of cartilaginous fish

Romerodus is an extinct genus of cartilaginous fish in the family Caseodontidae. It is known from the Carboniferous and possibly Permian periods of North America, and the only named species, R. orodontus, was discovered in organic shale deposits in the U.S. state of Nebraska. While it and the rest of its family were historically considered elasmobranchs related to sharks and rays, they are now regarded as holocephalans, a diverse subclass which is today only represented by chimaeras. It is one of few members of its order, the Eugeneodontiformes, that is known from multiple complete, well preserved body fossils, and is thus an important taxon for understanding the anatomy and ecology of less well preserved eugeneodonts. The genus name honors paleontologist Alfred Romer.

The body of R. orodontus was similar to that of other caseodontids. It possessed a slender, streamlined profile, a strongly keeled crescent-shaped caudal fin, and proportionally very small dorsal and pectoral fins. Unlike modern sharks and rays, there is no indication Romerodus possessed pelvic fins or claspers. Its teeth were smoother and less ornamented than those of other caseodonts, and were positioned in tightly packed rows. It inhabited deep-water marine environments, and like its relatives shows adaptations associated with life as a pelagic carnivore. Unlike its larger relatives, however, the largest known Romerodus were approximately 50 cm (20 in) in total length.

== Discovery and naming ==
Romerodus orodontus was named and described in 1981 by paleontologist Rainer Zangerl based on multiple crushed (but otherwise well-preserved) body fossils. R. orodontus lived between 307 and 304 million years ago, during the latest Moscovian to Kasimovian stages (described by Zangerl as the equivalent Westphalian D substage) of the Pennsylvanian subperiod. All described specimens originated from the Hansen Quarry, which is located in Sarpy County, Nebraska. The strata which produced these Romerodus fossils are part of the Stark Shale Member of the Dennis Formation and Wea Shale Member of the Cherryville Shale Formation, and are described as fissile, black, and organic.

The incomplete but articulated specimen FMNH PF 8522 from the Stark Shale is designated as the holotype of the genus and species, and consists of the front half of the animal preserved in ventral (bottom) view. Alongside the incomplete holotype, eight assigned paratype specimens were included in the initial description, from which the complete anatomy can be observed. The holotype and paratypes are housed at the Field Museum of Natural History, with additional known specimens now being part of private collections. The genus name honors the influential vertebrate paleontologist Alfred Romer.

Isolated teeth referred to as "cf. Romerodus sp." have been identified from the Early Permian Phosphoria Formation, in exposed limestone deposits in what are now Grand Teton and Yellowstone national parks. The condition of fossils recovered from these localities is poor due to extensive weathering, and they have not been described in detail.

== Description ==
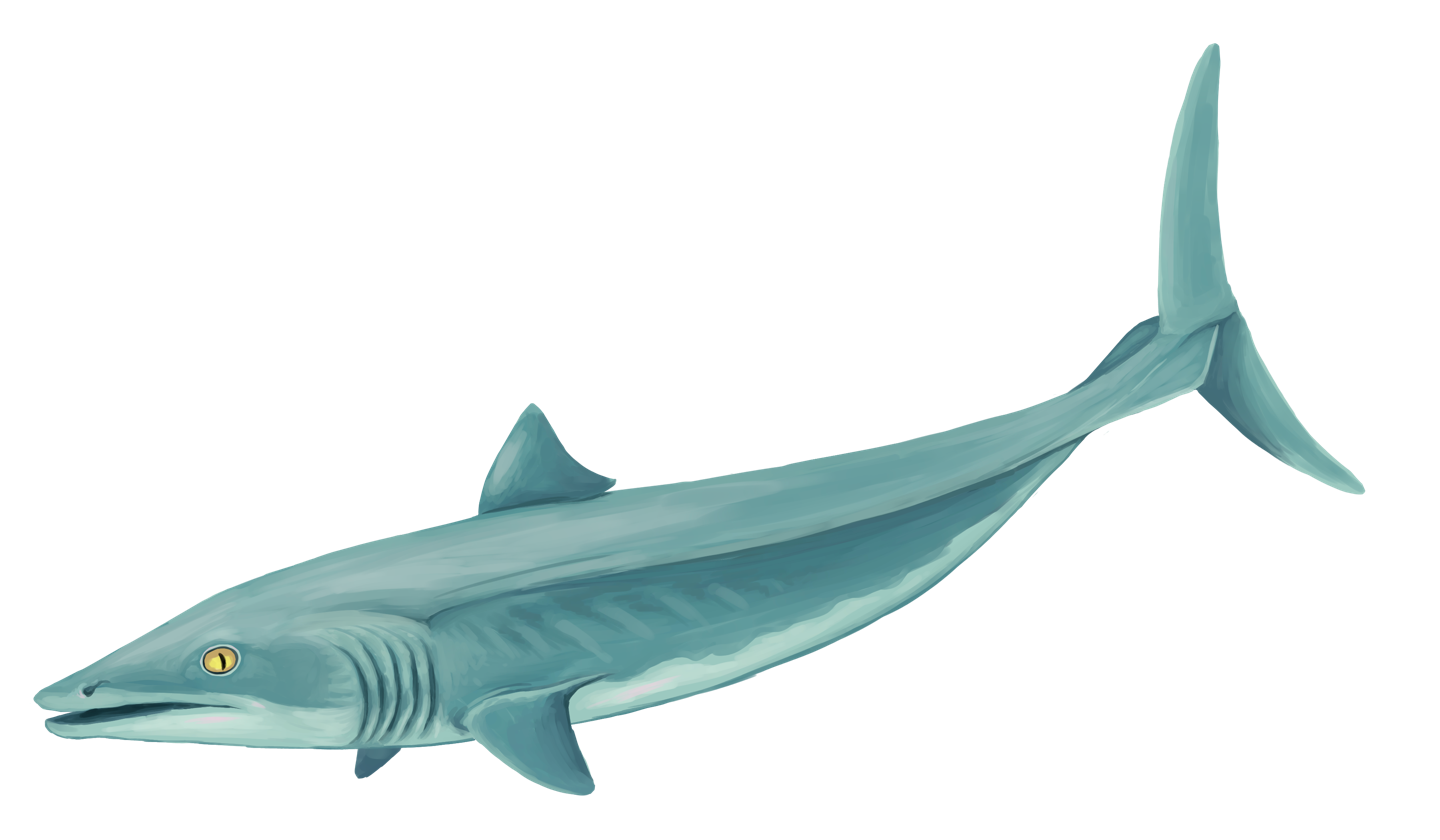
Life reconstruction of Romerodus

Examples of articulated specimens assigned to Romerodus are preserved in both ventral (underside) and lateral (profile) views. The phosphatized remains consist of the animal's full body outline and skin, along with detailed preservation of the calcified cartilage of the lower jaws and pectoral region, and the delicate pterygiophores and ceratotrichia which supported the pectoral fins. The maximum total length of R. orodontus is stated to be approximately 50 cm (20 in) in its description, although a specimen of indeterminate species in the collection of René Kindlimann has been measured at 56 cm (22 in) in length.

=== Body and fins ===
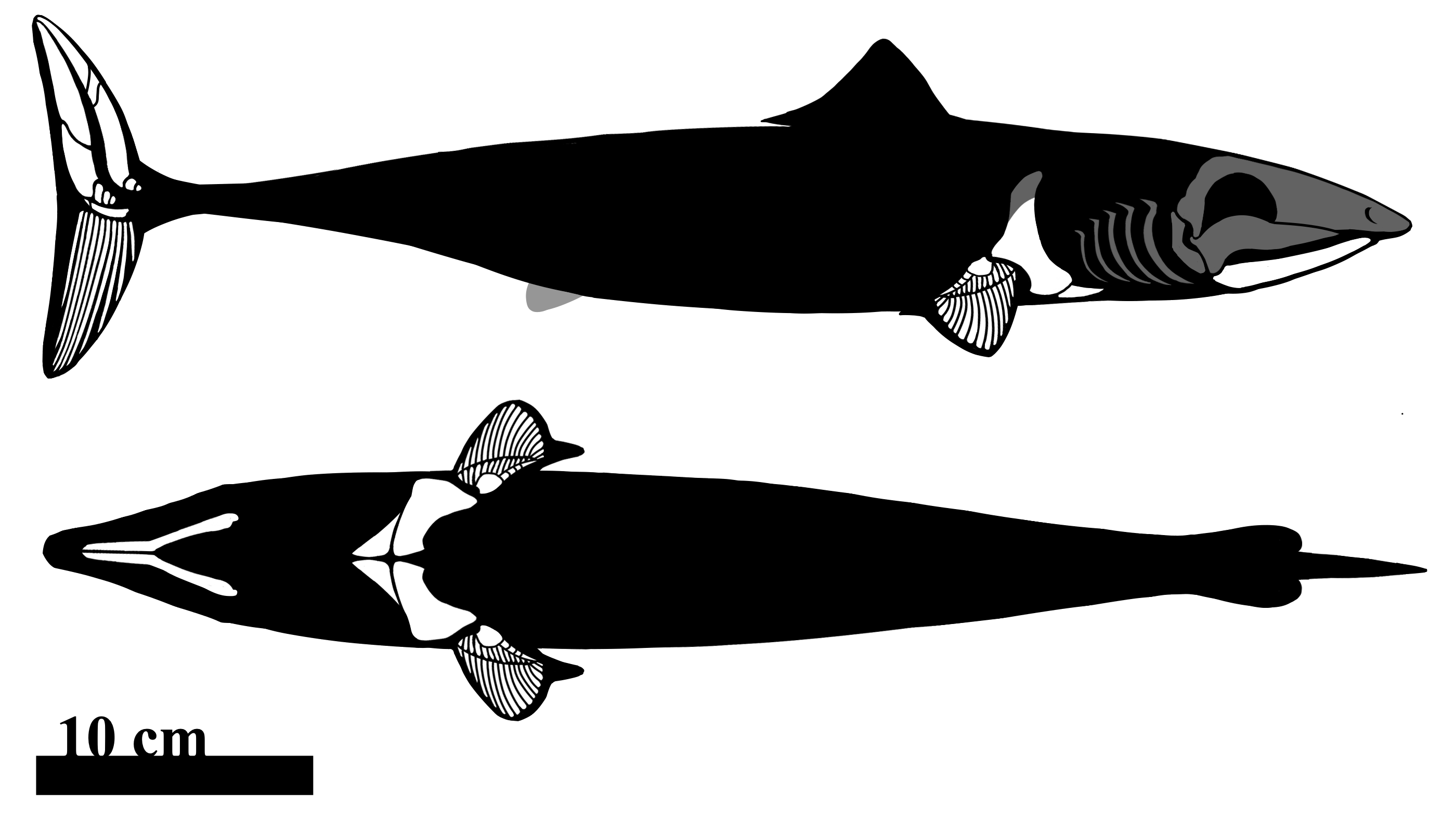
Skeletal reconstruction of R. orodontus, with well described material in white and preserved but poorly defined material in gray. The body outline as shown represents the extent of phosphatized skin

The appearance of Romerodus was typical of a caseodontid. Many elements of Romerodus' cartilaginous skeleton were calcified, with the exceptions of the vertebral centra and the radials of the dorsal fin. The pectoral fins were proportionally very small. As in its closest relatives, the chevrons and neural arches of the caudal (tail) fin's upper lobe were broad and greatly fused. This condition is in contrast with eugeneodontids such as Eugeneodus and is most similar to that seen in Fadenia. The scapulocoracoids (pectoral girdle) were well-developed but unfused, similar to those of many other Paleozoic chondrichthyans. Below the pectoral girdles were paired cartilages of unknown function, which may have been homologous to the unpaired sternum-like structure observed in the related Ornithoprion and Fadenia.

The appearance of Romerodus was typical of a caseodontid. According to Zangerl's 1981 description, the profile was fusiform, with a forked, homocercal caudal fin and greatly enlarged keels at the base of the tail (termed the caudal peduncle). No specimens show any indication of pelvic fins, a pelvic girdle, or claspers, suggesting that these structures were either greatly reduced or absent in life. Neither a second dorsal fin nor fin spine has been identified, as in other eugeneodonts. The single dorsal fin was supported by a plate of fused basal cartilage and was positioned above the pectoral girdle. The pectoral fins were proportionally very small.

=== Teeth ===
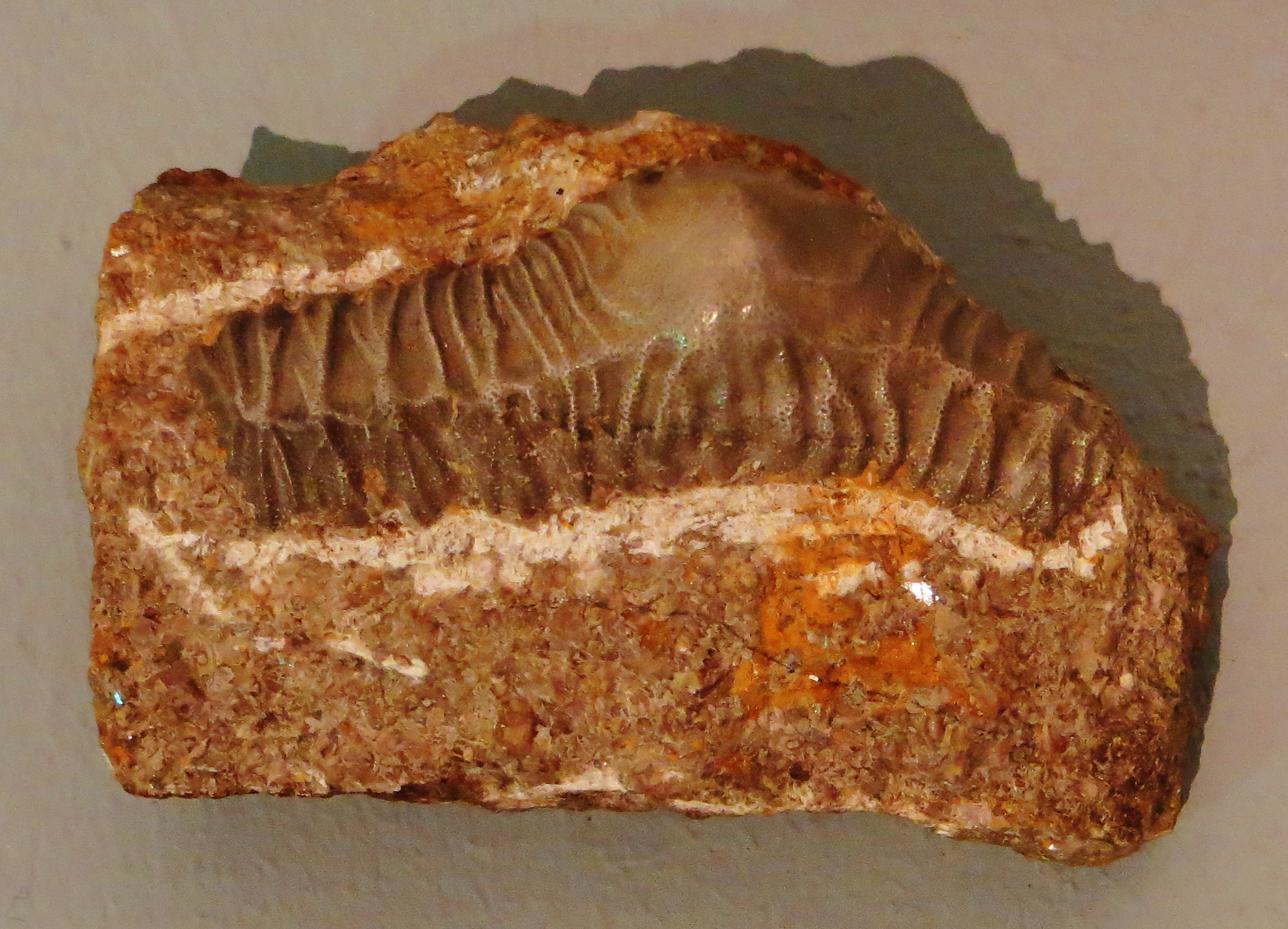
The teeth of Romerodus were extremely similar to those of the orodontids, such as Orodus ramosus (pictured)

Michal Ginter and coauthors described information on the dentition of Romerodus as "sparse". As in other eugeneodonts, the teeth of R. orodontus formed a pavement-like dentition (broad, flattened, and overlapping), although its roots uniquely lacked deep crenulations and its crowns lacked the "buttress-like" ridges seen in the pavement teeth of many other caseodonts. In Eugeneodontiformes and Orodontiformes the pavement teeth were typically arranged in tightly packed lateral rows along the upper and lower jaws, and Zangerl characterized the tooth morphology seen in Romerodus orodontus as indistinguishable from that of members of the family Orodontidae. Romerodus bore a whorl of teeth along the midline, or symphysis, of the lower jaw. The whorl-bearing portion of the jaw in R. orodontus was roughly 25% of the length of the skull, making it proportionally shorter than in other measured caseodonts in which it ranged from 28–40% of the skull's length.

== Classification ==
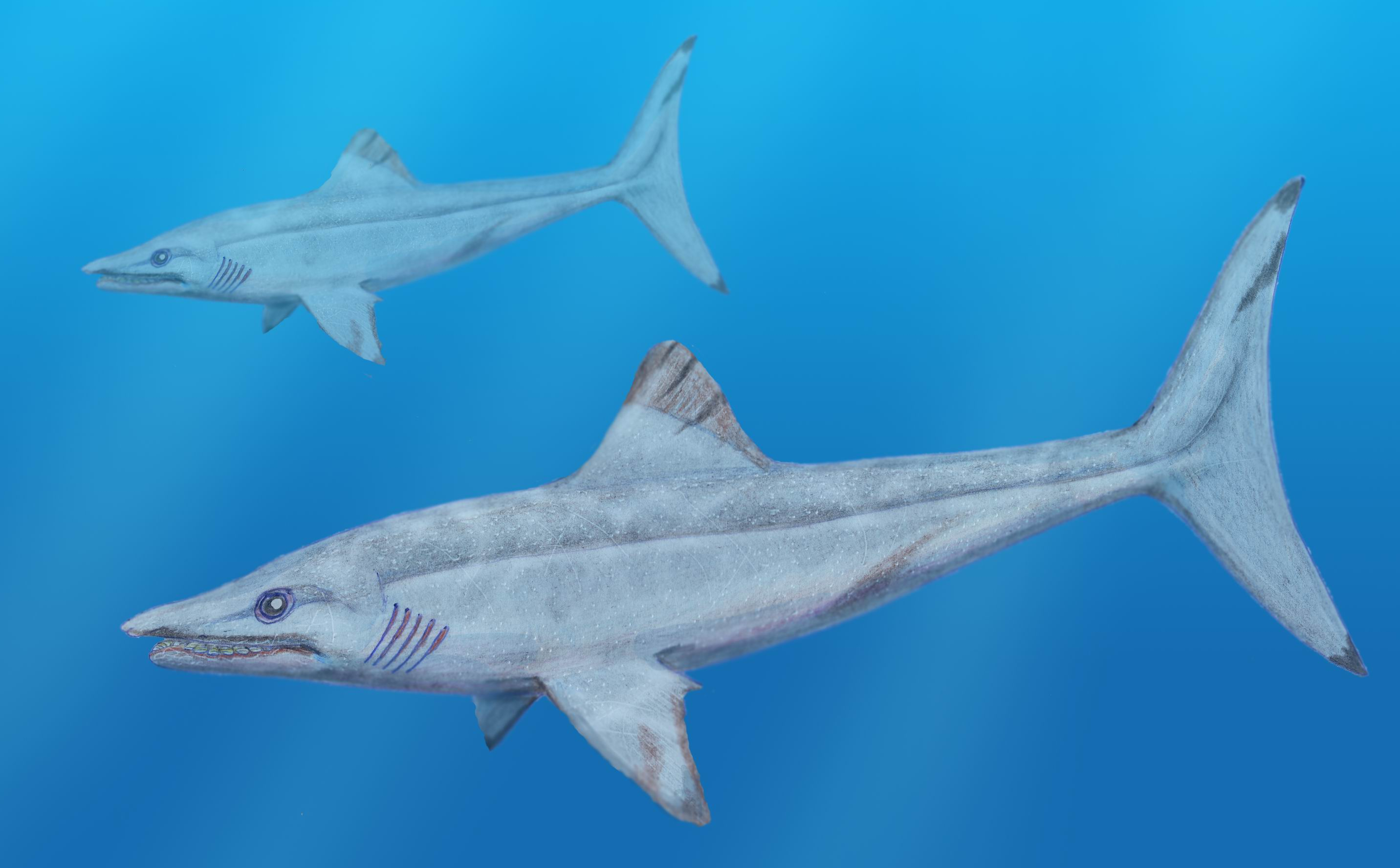
The morphologically similar caseodont Caseodus (pictured) has been considered the closest relative of Romerodus

When initially described, Romerodus was assigned to the subclass Elasmobranchii, a group of cartilaginous fish which includes true sharks and their relatives and which Zangerl believed included the eugeneodonts as well. Subsequent findings, however, strongly suggest that the order Eugeneodontiformes, to which Romerodus belongs, are a lineage of holocephalan fish distantly related to living chimaeras. This classification is based on the suspension of the jaw in eugeneodonts (termed autodiastylic) which is distinctive of early holocephalans. The histology of the teeth, which in some genera are composed of trabecular dentin (a distinctive form of dentin found in holocephalans) has also supported a relation with this group. Despite their evolutionary proximity to chimaeras, eugeneodonts converged on a similar body and tooth morphology to sharks due to shared ecology.

The Eugeneodontifomes is subdivided into the Edestoidea and Eugeneodontoidei superfamilies based on differences in the structure of the symphyseal tooth whorl, with Romerodus representing a member of the latter and, more specifically, a member of the family Caseodontidae. Zangerl's morphological analysis of the group, published in 1981, indicates that R. orodontus is most closely related to the genus Caseodus. The postcranial anatomy of the caseodonts has been described as extremely conserved and is thought to have varied little between genera, although features in their skulls and teeth indicate they were an ecologically diverse group. The phylogeny of the Eugeneodontiformes (termed by Zangerl as the Eugeneodontida) as presented in Zangerl (1981) is provided below.

- - Eugeneodontida (=Eugeneodontiformes)
    - Caseodontoidea
      - Caseodontidae
        - - - Fadenia
            - Erikodus
          - Ornithoprion
        - - Caseodus
          - Romerodus
      - Eugeneodontidae
        - Bobbodus
        - - Eugeneodus
          - Gilliodus
    - Edestoidea
      - - Agassizodontidae (=Helicoprionidae)
          - - - Campyloprion
              - Parahelicoprion
            - Helicoprion
          - - Agassizodus
            - - Toxoprion
              - Sarcoprion
      - Edestidae
        - - Syntomodus
          - - Lestrodus
            - Edestus
        - - Helicampodus
          - Parahelicampodus

== Paleoecology ==
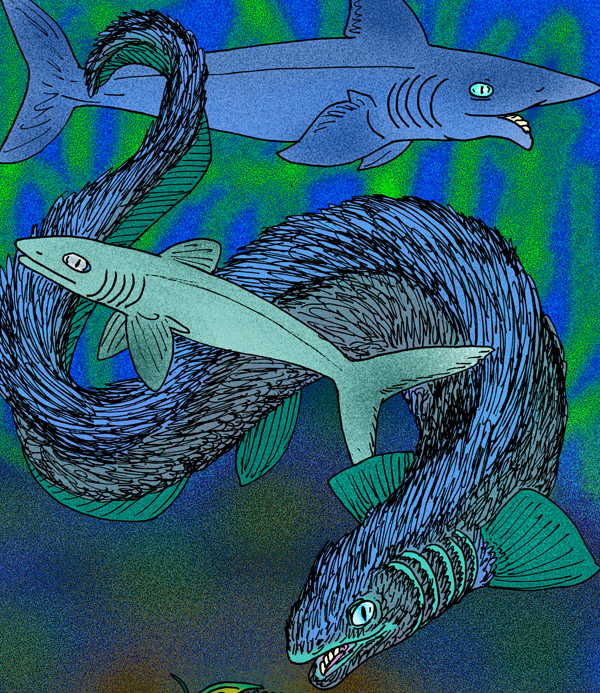
Romerodus (center) alongside Agassizodus (top) and Listracanthus (bottom), all of which inhabited the Midcontinent Sea during the late Pennsylvanian

The Stark Shale, where the type specimen of R. orodontus originated, is believed to have been a marine depositional environment. During the Late Carboniferous, Nebraska was part of the Late Pennsylvanian Midcontinent Sea; a deep, inland sea which was rich in phosphates and organic material. The Stark Shale has been interpreted as a deep-water, offshore habitat with a cold, anoxic (lacking oxygen) bottom created by a strong thermocline (temperature gradient) and halocline (salinity gradient). Upwellings would have caused nutrient-rich conditions in the upper water column, encouraging the growth of algae and other plankton which, as they died, would be deposited on the oxygen-poor seafloor to form shale. The Wea Shale is also considered to represent an offshore marine environment with comparable preservational conditions, although it was likely deposited in shallower waters. In black shales such as the Stark and Wea, benthic fauna is rare. Fossils of benthic animals have been proposed to have originated from more habitable environments or to represent individuals which became detached from floating debris. It is hypothesized that most of the species preserved at the site were pelagic and lived high in the water column. The pelagic animals then sank to the anoxic seabed after death, where they were preserved in exceptional detail due to the lack of decomposers and scavengers. The conditions observed in these mid-continent shales are associated with warmer interglacial periods during the late Paleozoic ice age.

The Stark and Wea shales preserve a variety of other fishes in addition to Romerodus, including some of the most complete cartilaginous fish specimens known from the Paleozoic. These include Cobelodus,Heslerodus, Listracanthus, several species of well-preserved iniopterygian, and other eugeneodonts such as Gilliodus, Agassizodus, and indeterminate genera known only from a pectoral fin or isolated tooth whorls.Conodonts and paleoniscoid fishes are also known,with the conodont variety providing further evidence of a deep, stratified water column with multiple faunal communities at varying levels. The known invertebrate fossils of the Stark and Wea shales include jellyfish, brachiopods, crinoids, bryozoans, and multiple species of tyrannophontid. It has been proposed that the tyrannophontid crustaceans, which are found only in isolated regions, may have been part of a poorly known benthic fauna which was adapted to oxygen-poor deep waters, or alternatively originated from die-offs in a shallower ecosystem nearby. Multiple species of small, ink-producing coleoids are known from the Stark Shale, as well as several kinds of ammonoid.

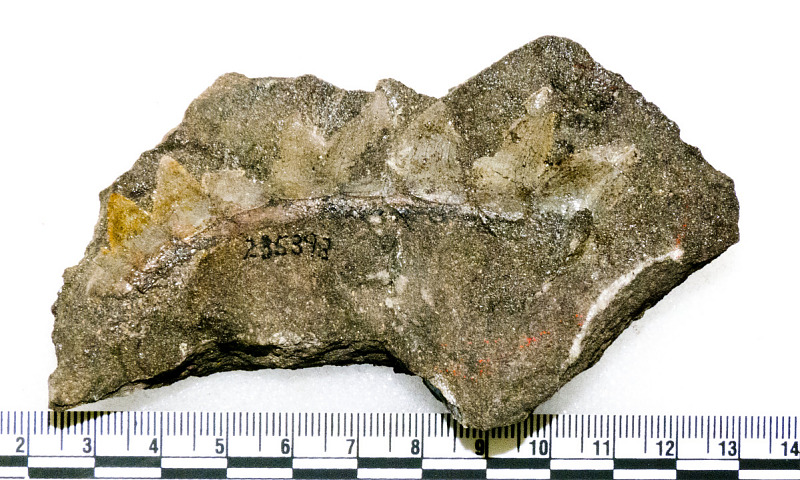
Tooth-whorl of Sinohelicoprion, collected from the Phosphoria Formation of Grand Teton National Park

The Permian Phosphoria Formation, in which Romerodus may occur, also preserves a diverse assemblage of chondrichthyans. Fossils discovered at the Yellowstone and Grand Teton exposures are often heavily weathered, however, making precise identification of taxa difficult. The deposits which yield Romerodus-like fish are limestones preserving large numbers of unassociated teeth, bones, and fin spines from different species collected together, which may represent mass-death assemblages. Among the genera confidently identified at these sites are Glikmanius, Deltodus, and a rare North American occurrence of the otherwise Asian genus Sinohelicoprion. The site has also yielded examples of platysomids, cochliodonts, petalodonts and orodonts, although many of these have not been identified confidently to the genus level.

== Paleobiology and significance ==
=== Diet and proposed lifestyle ===
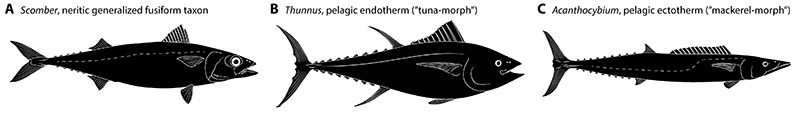
General trends associated with a pelagic lifestyle among fishes, as proposed in Engelmann (2024). Eugeneodontiformes were cited as an example of a lineage which shows pelagic adaptations

In life Romerodus was, as has been proposed for all eugeneodonts, an active, nektonic carnivore, and it is assumed to have been a very powerful swimmer. Russell Engelmann, in a 2024 paper, proposed that aspects of eugeneodont anatomy such as the greatly reduced or absent pelvic fins, forked caudal fin, and streamlined body are adaptations associated with a pelagic lifestyle among other living and extinct fishes.

=== Use in reconstructing Helicoprion ===
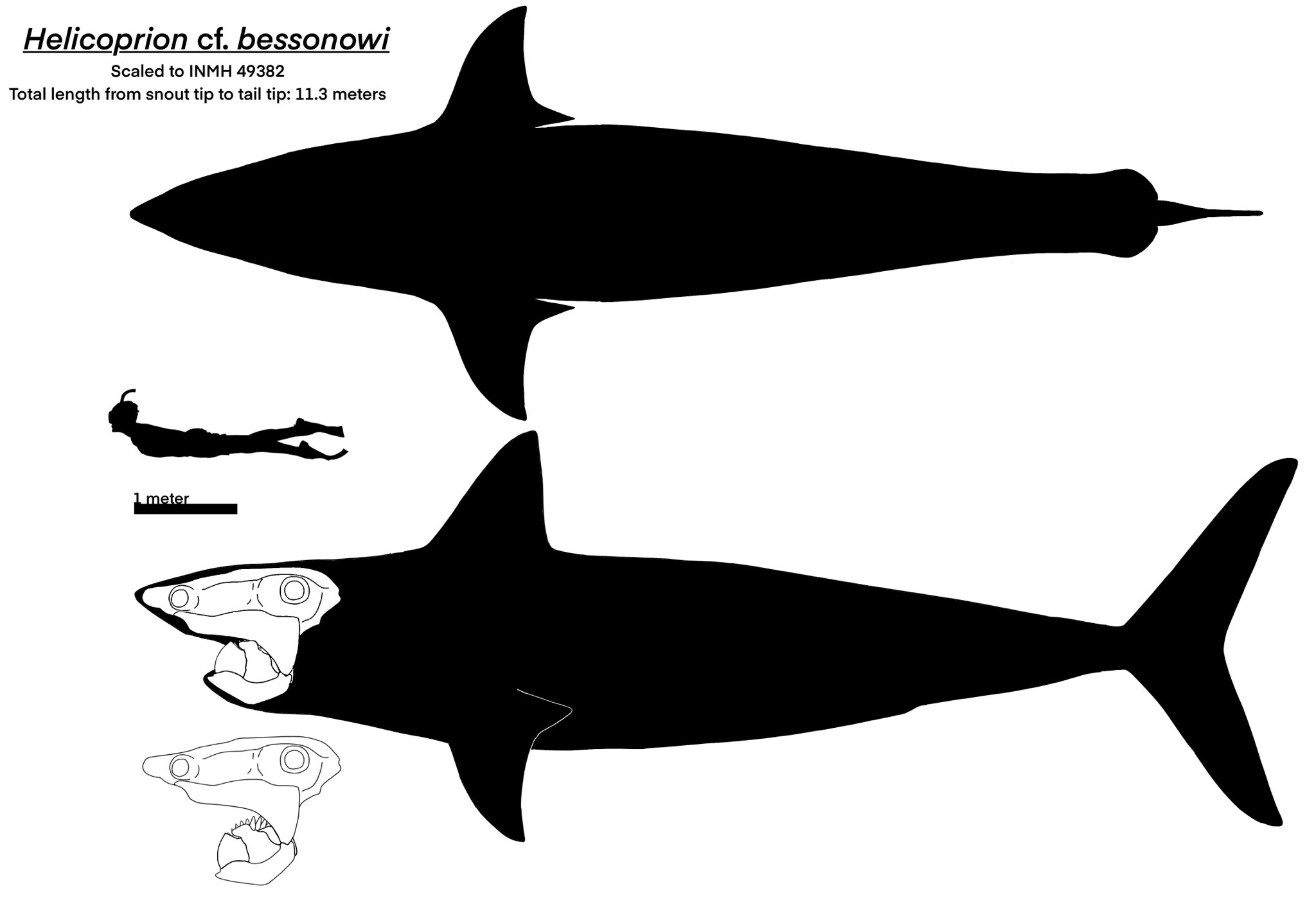
Reconstruction of a very large Helicoprion, based partially on the postcranial anatomy of R. orodontus

Thanks to its well preserved body fossils, Romerodus has been used to approximate the size, proportions, and anatomy of the distantly related genus Helicoprion. Postcranial remains of edestoids, the superfamily to which Helicoprion belongs, are entirely unknown, leaving caseodonts as the closest analogues to bracket their anatomy. Directly scaling the cranial and postcranial proportions of Romerodus and its close relatives indicates the largest known Helicoprion individuals may have been between 7 to 11 m (23 to 36 ft) in length, although such estimates rely on the notion that both fish were close in ecology and phylogenetic position. Due to its short jaws and proportionally large tooth whorl, however, Helicoprion may have been more anatomically different from caseodonts than previously assumed, and a subsequent publication has suggested lengths around 7 m (23 ft) are likely the most reasonable. The Idaho Museum of Natural History displayed murals and a life-sized replica of Helicoprion davidsii, which featured body proportions and anatomy based on caseodonts such as Romerodus.

== See also ==
- List of prehistoric cartilaginous fish genera
