= Eugeneodontidae =

Eugeneodontidae Temporal range: Moscovian-Wuchiapingian Possible Famennian records and a doubtful Frasnian record, see text

Scientific classification
- Kingdom: Animalia
- Phylum: Chordata
- Class: Chondrichthyes
- Subclass: Holocephali
- Order: †Eugeneodontiformes
- Family: †Eugeneodontidae; Zangerl, 1981

Type genus
- Eugeneodus Zangerl, 1981

Type species
- Eugeneodus richardsoni Zangerl, 1981

Genera
- Bobbodus; Eugeneodus; Gilliodus

Extinct family of cartilaginous fishes

The Eugeneodontidae is an extinct family of cartilaginous fish known from the Carboniferous, Permian, and potentially Devonian periods of the United States, Iran, and possibly Belgium, Poland and Russia. The eugeneodontids are known primarily from fossilized teeth, as well as the remains of the jaws, gills and in some species nearly complete skeletons with coatings of dermal denticles. The genera Bobbodus, Gilliodus and the type genus Eugeneodus are included within the family. Eugeneodontidae is considered the sister group to the family Caseodontidae, and the two are included together within the suborder Caseodontoidea and the order Eugeneodontiformes. The type genus, and by extension the family and the order Eugeneodontiformes are named in honor of Paleontologist Eugene S. Richardson Jr.

Members of the family are united by the structure of their teeth, which consist of both rows of flat, tightly packed tooth-plates which form what is known as a "pavement dentition" and a single row of teeth along the midline of the lower jaw known as a tooth whorl. While other members of Eugeneodontida possess a similar arrangement, the Eugeneodontidae is unique in that their pavement teeth have bladed cutting edges. Members of this family have been proposed to have been evolutionarily primitive members of Eugeneodontiformes, due to features of their upper jaws and caudal fins. Members of the family are thought to have been durophagous carnivores which inhabited marine environments. The family became extinct during the Late Permian.

== Discovery and history of research ==
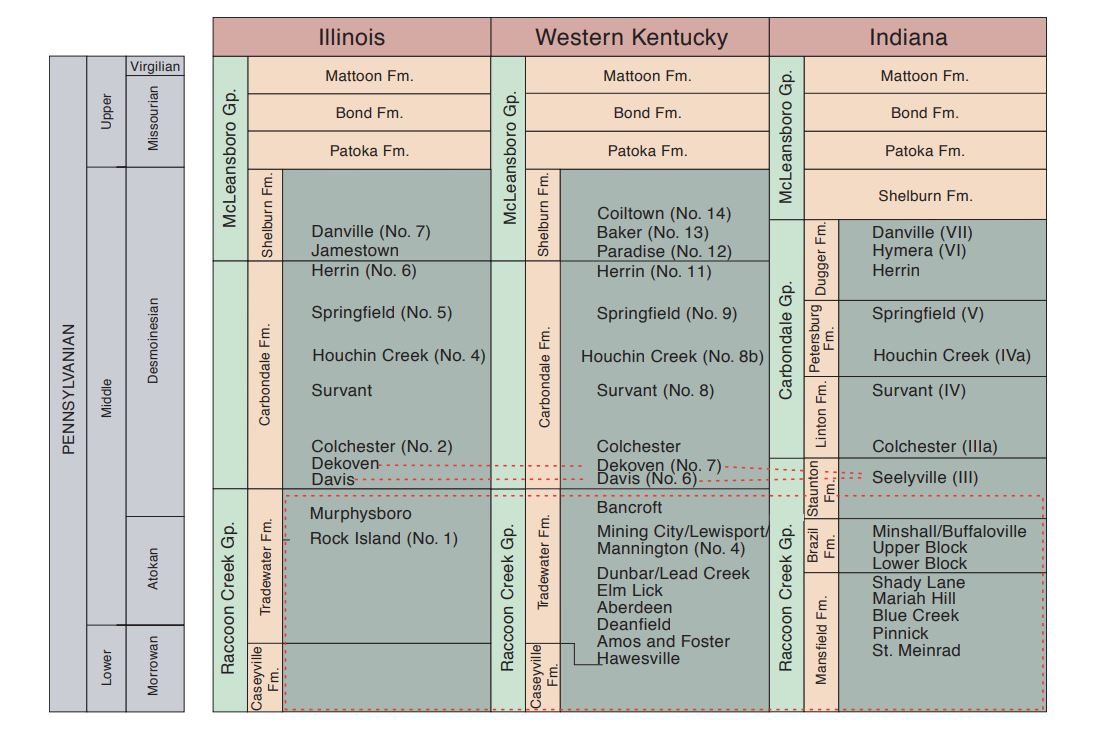
Stratigraphy of the Illinois Basin, where the remains of Eugeneodus and Gilliodus have been found

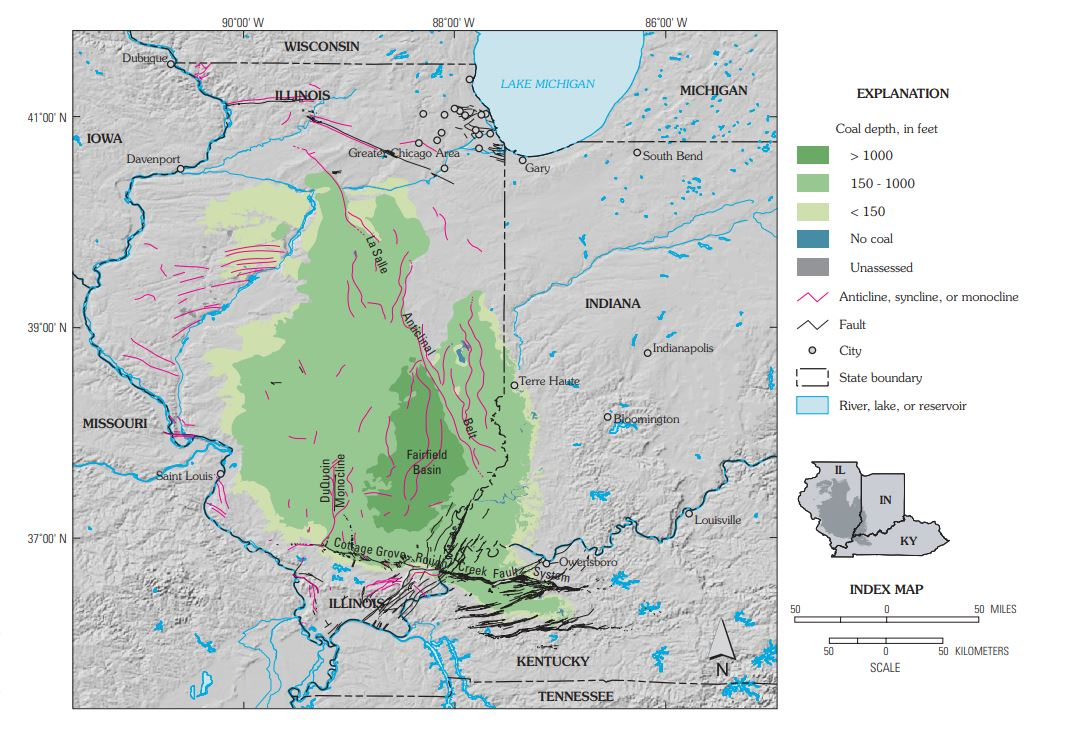
Map of the Illinois Basin, showing its extent through the states of Indiana, Illinois and Kentucky. Multiple sites in Indiana have yielded remains of eugeneodontids

Eugeneodontid fossil material was first collected between 1957 and 1958. One of these specimens (designated FMNH PF-2541) was described as belonging to the genus Agassizodus by paleontologist Rainer Zangerl in 1966, before later being reclassified as the new genus Eugeneodus by the same author. The Eugeneodontidae was formally named and described by Zangerl in 1981, and Eugeneodus richardsoni was designated as the type species. E. richardsoni (and by extension its family and accompanying order Eugeneodontiformes) is named in honor of Eugene S. Richardson Jr., who is cited as a colleague and personal friend of Zangerl. As initially defined, Eugeneodontidae included Bobbodus schaefferi, Gilliodus orvillei, G. peyeri and the aforementioned type species, all of which were described in the same publication as the family and based on fossil material originating from Moscovian-Gzhelian stage (Defined by Zangerl as Westephalian C and D and Stephanian A respectively) deposits in Indiana, Iowa, and Nebraska. The holotype specimens of all four species are housed at the Field Museum of Natural History.

Eugeneodus and Gilliodus are both known from a large number of specimens from the Logan Quarry, Mecca Quarry, and Excello shales of Indiana and the Stark and Wea shales of Nebraska. These remains include the partially articulated, nearly complete holotype specimens of E. richardsoni (FMNH PF-2625) and G. orvillei (FMNH PF-8535) as well as dentitions, isolated skeletal elements and partially digested remains within the regurgitated boluses of other fish. The fossils of these taxa are preserved in black shale, and the anatomy of Eugeneodus richarsoni and Gilliodus orvellei has been studied primarily by use of x-ray imaging. Bobbodus schaefferi was initially described based on two partial dentitions from the Pennsylvanian of Nebraska and Iowa.

Following the family's description, several additional discoveries have been made. In 1996, additional skeletal material belonging to Bobbodus schaefferi was described from the earliest Permian Red Eagle Formation of Kansas, preserving the cartilage of the upper jaw and revealing that the temporal range of the species extended beyond the Carboniferous. An additional species of Bobbodus, B. xerxesi, was described in 2013 from the Late Permian (Wuchiapingian) of Central Iran, alongside another indeterminate eugeneodontid from the same formation. These represent the youngest known members of the family and, in the case of B. xerxesi, the only named occurrence outside of North America, although both taxa are known only from a single, isolated tooth plate each. Remains assigned to Bobbodus have also been identified from the Late Devonian (Famennian) of the Ardennes, Belgium as well, although these have not been assigned to a particular species within the genus. A Famennian fossil from the Tula Oblast, Russia has been tentatively suggested to represent an indeterminate genus of eugeneodontid. An isolated tooth-plate from the Late Devonian (Frasnian) of Poland was formerly assigned to the genus Gilliodus, although it is now thought to likely belong to an entirely unrelated cartilaginous fish.

== Description ==
=== Teeth and denticles ===
The teeth of the eugeneodontids consisted of both square, flattened teeth arranged in many rows along the lateral faces of the jaws (termed a "tooth pavement" or "tooth battery"), and a single row of teeth along the midline of the lower jaw termed a tooth whorl. Unlike some other members of Eugeneodontiformes, the midline (or symphyseal) tooth whorls were not proportionally large or well developed in the eugeneodontids, and in Bobbodus schaefferi the whorl's teeth appear similar in morphology to the pavement teeth. The pavement teeth are the defining characteristic of the family, as unlike other members of their order such as caseodontids or edestoids these pavement teeth had sharp cutting edges. In both species of Gilliodus, the pavement teeth formed flattened blades with small crenulations arranged along their edge. In Eugeneodus and Bobbodus, the pavement teeth possessed tall, widely spaced "buttress-like" ridges along their labial (outer) side, and small, more numerous ridges or crenulations on their lingual (inner) side. In Bobbodus, there may have been as many as 200 pavement teeth in a single jaw quadrant, compared to 12 teeth composing the symphyseal tooth whorl. The teeth of Gilliodus were covered in a layer of enameloid.

The bodies of the eugeneodontids were entirely coated in shark-like dermal denticles, to enough of an extent that it obscures the anatomy of the underlying skeleton in articulated specimens. There were two morphologies of denticle: single, leaf-shaped scales called lepidomoria, and compound scales with multiple crowns termed polyodontode scales. In Eugeneodus, the lepidomorial scales were proportionally very small and consisted of dentin. It is believed that the lepidomoria of Eugeneodus are similar to those of ancestral chondrichthyans.

=== Skull and skeleton ===
The known skulls of both Eugeneodus and Gilliodus are crushed and partially disarticulated, but do preserve the neurocranium (braincase), palatoquadrates (upper jaw) and Meckel's cartilages (lower jaw). The palatoquadrates of these genera were reduced and band-like, and did not anchor the upper teeth. The Meckel's cartilages were similarly thin and band-like, and were not fused together at their anterior (front) where the tooth whorl was positioned. Uniquely, Bobbodus had a well-developed palatoquadrates to which rows of pavement-teeth were attached. Rather than being reduced, the palatoquadrates of Bobbodus schaefferi were comparable in shape and functionality to those of other Paleozoic chondrichthyans, a feature unique to this genus among caseodontoids.

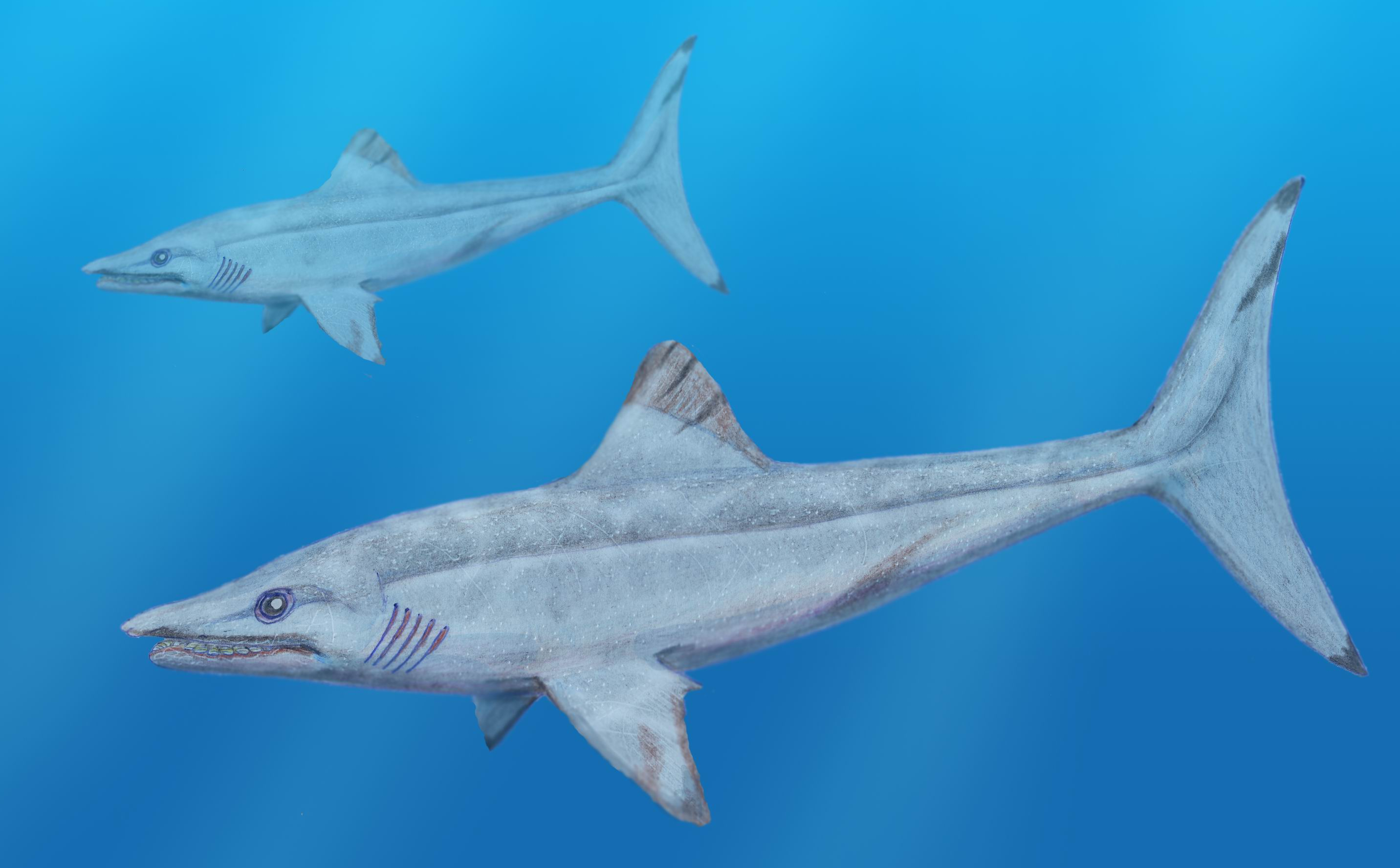
The caseodontid Caseodus, the postcranial skeleton of which is indistinguishable from the eugeneodontid Gilliodus

Both Eugeneodus and Gilliodus are known from essentially complete and partially articulated postcranial skeletons. In these taxa, the vertebral centra are unpreserved and were most likely uncalcified, while the scapulocoracoids, haemal arches, neural arches and the basal plate of the dorsal fin were calcified. The postcranial skeleton of Gilliodus is noted to be indistinguishable from that of the distantly related caseodontid Caseodus, while in Eugeneodus it is differentiated by the form of the neural and haemal arches in the caudal fin. These processes in E. richardsoni were only lightly fused, unlike in Gilliodus and all other known caseodontoids in which they were extensively fused into an inflexible, triangular mass of cartilage. As in the caseodontids, there is no indication that the eugeneodontids possessed a pelvic girdle, pelvic fins or claspers. The only postcranial element known of Bobbodus is a fragmentary visceral arch assigned to B. schaefferi.

== Evolution and classification ==
In his 1981 description of the family, Rainer Zangerl considered Eugeneodus to represent the most skeletally "primitive" known eugeneodont due to the anatomy of its caudal fin, although he did not regard the family as directly ancestral to other members of Eugeneodontiformes. He instead considered the family to be the sister taxon to Caseodontidae, with the two together forming the suborder Caseodontoidea. A 1996 study suggested that Bobbodus was the basalmost known eugeneodontid based on its well developed palatoquadrates, and agreed that the family was sister to Caseodontidae within Caseodontoidea. Both the 1981 and 1996 studies regarded the family as a member of the subclass Elasmobranchii, making them distant relatives of modern sharks and rays. More recent sources have alternatively considered the Eugeneodontiformes (and thus the included family Eugeneodontidae) to be members of Holocephali, making them closer relatives of modern chimaeras than sharks. A cladogram of the order Eugeneodontiformes as proposed by Zangerl (1981) is provided below.

- Eugeneodontida (=Eugeneodontiformes)
  - Caseodontoidea
    - Caseodontidae
      - - - Fadenia
          - Erikodus
        - Ornithoprion
      - - Caseodus
        - Romerodus
    - Eugeneodontidae
      - Bobbodus
      - - Eugeneodus
        - Gilliodus
  - Edestoidea
    - Agassizodontidae (=Helicoprionidae)
      - - - Campyloprion
          - Parahelicoprion
        - Helicoprion
      - - Agassizodus
        - - Toxoprion
          - Sarcoprion
    - Edestidae
      - - Syntomodus
        - - Lestrodus
          - Edestus
      - - Helicampodus
        - Parahelicampodus

== Paleobiology and paleoecology ==
the eugeneodontids were nektonic predators, whose crushing tooth-plates imply a durophagous diet and whose body proportions imply an active, fast-moving lifestyle. Features observed in Gilliodus, Eugeneodus and many other caseodontoids such as fusiform bodies, homocercal caudal fins and reduced pelvic fins are associated with a pelagic mode of life. Eugeneodontids themselves were prey for other fishes, and they are sometimes preserved mangled and disarticulated inside regurgites or coprolites produced by larger predators.

While Devonian records of eugeneodontids are often tentative, they may represent some of the oldest known members of the Eugeneodontiformes, most of which appear during the later Carboniferous and Permian periods. More confidently assigned specimens of eugeneodontids are known primarily from shallow, lagoonal, Pennsylvanian-Early Permian shales and limestones along the North American coasts of the Panthalassan Ocean, although they occur in deep-water shales such as the Stark and Wea Shale as well. The occurrence of at least two species in the Late Permian-age Tethys Ocean indicates that the family continued to spread and diversify throughout the Paleozoic, and attained a wide geographic distribution by the time of its extinction. All known genera inhabited marine or estuarine environments.
