= Gilliodus =

Gilliodus Temporal range: Carboniferous 315.2–303.7 Ma

Scientific classification
- Kingdom: Animalia
- Phylum: Chordata
- Class: Chondrichthyes
- Subclass: Holocephali
- Order: †Eugeneodontiformes
- Family: †Eugeneodontidae
- Genus: †Gilliodus; Zangerl, 1981

Type species
- †Gilliodus orvellei Zangerl, 1981

Other species
- †G. peyeri Zangerl, 1981

Extinct genus of cartilaginous fish

Gilliodus is an extinct genus of eugeneodontid cartilaginous fish from the Carboniferous of North America. Two species, G. orvellei and G. peyeri, are known. The postcranial skeleton of the genus is indistinguishable in appearance to the distantly related caseodontid Caseodus, and the genus is differentiated by the anatomy of its teeth. An isolated tooth from the Late Devonian of Poland has been suggested to belong to Gilliodus, but later authors have concluded that this tooth more likely belonged to a different order of fishes.

== Discovery and naming ==
Gilliodus is known from fossils of Late Carboniferous (Moscovian to Kasimovian) age, found in shales in the Midwestern United States. G. orvellei is known from Indiana, while G. peyeri is known from both Indiana and Nebraska. The genus and both species were described in 1981 by paleontologist Rainer Zangerl. The genus name and the name of the type species honor Orville "Gillie" Gilpin, who was a fossil curator at the Field Museum of Natural History.

Additional teeth from the Late Carboniferous of Colorado may have belonged to G. peyeri, and a tooth from the Late Devonian of the Świętokrzyskie Mountains, Poland has been suggested to belong to the genus as well. The Devonian tooth has since been reclassified as that of an unrelated fish in a different taxonomic order by Michal Ginter and coauthors.

== Description ==
The teeth of Gilliodus consisted of both rows of rectangular teeth along the lateral (side) edges of the jaws, and a set of teeth along the midline of the lower jaw, termed a tooth-whorl. The lateral teeth differed in the shape of their crowns between the two species: in G. peyeri they were rectangular and blade-like, while in G. orvellei they were not bladed and came to a point. Both species are united by possessing rows of well-developed ridges on their lateral teeth. The teeth were composed of dentin and were covered in an outer layer of enameloid. The lower jaws (or Meckel's cartilages) of both species were not fused at their anterior (forward) end and had the tooth-whorl positioned between them. The skeleton of Gilliodus was made up largely of calcified cartilage, although the dorsal fin and the vertebral column were uncalcified and are not preserved in fossils. The postcranial skeleton of Gilliodus was apparently identical in appearance to that of the caseodontid Caseodus.

== Classification ==
Gilliodus is a member of the order Eugeneodontiformes (originally spelled Eugeneodontida), and more specifically the family Eugeneodontidae. Zangerl considered the genus to be the sister taxon of Eugeneodus based on morphological analysis in his 1981 description of this family and order.

- Eugeneodontida (=Eugeneodontiformes)
  - Caseodontoidea
    - Caseodontidae
    - Eugeneodontidae
      - Bobbodus
      - - Eugeneodus
        - Gilliodus
  - Edestoidea

== Paleobiology ==
In life, Gilliodus were nektonic carnivores. Based on the lack of wear to the enameloid coatings on its teeth, Zangerl suggested that Gilliodus had a rapid rate of tooth-replacement.
