= Bobbodus =

Bobbodus Temporal range: Kasimovian–Wuchiapingian

Scientific classification
- Kingdom: Animalia
- Phylum: Chordata
- Class: Chondrichthyes
- Order: †Eugeneodontiformes
- Family: †Eugeneodontidae
- Genus: †Bobbodus; Zangerl, 1981

Type species
- †Bobbodus schaefferi Zangerl, 1981

Other species
- B. xerxesi Hampe et al., 2013

Extinct genus of cartilaginous fish

Bobbodus is an extinct genus of eugeneodont holocephalian from the Carboniferous and Permian periods.

== Species ==
B. schaefferi is the type species and is known from three specimens, all from what was the eastern coast of the Panthalassic Ocean. Fossils of this species were found in the Kasimovian of Iowa, Gzhelian of Nebraska, Asselian of Kansas. Specimens of this species show the partial upper and lower dentition, the palatoquadrate, and gill arch.

A second species, B. xerxesi, is known from a single tooth found in Wuchiapingian-aged deposits in the Baghuk Mountains of central Iran. It is named for Xerxes, a famous Archaemenid ruler from the area whose monuments impressed the first author of the paper describing it.
