= Eugeneodus =

Eugeneodus Temporal range: Carboniferous 315–307 Ma

Scientific classification
- Kingdom: Animalia
- Phylum: Chordata
- Class: Chondrichthyes
- Subclass: Holocephali
- Order: †Eugeneodontiformes
- Family: †Eugeneodontidae
- Genus: †Eugeneodus; Zangerl, 1981

Species
- †E. richardsoni Zangerl, 1981

Extinct genus of cartilaginous fish

Eugeneodus is an extinct genus of eugeneodontid cartilaginous fish from the Carboniferous of North America. A single species, E. richardsoni, is known, and both its genus and species name honor paleontologist Eugene S. Richardson Jr. It is differentiated from its close relatives by the unfused nature of the neural and haemal arches in its caudal fin and the anatomy of its flattened, rectangular teeth (termed pavement teeth). It is the type genus of the order Eugeneodontiformes.

== Discovery and naming ==
Specimens now assigned to Eugeneodus were first discovered during the late 1950s in Carboniferous-age shales in the Midwestern United States. These fossils were first tentatively assigned to the genus Agassizodus. In 1981, the genus was formally described by researcher Rainer Zangerl, along with a single species, Eugeneodus richardsoni. Both the genus and species name honor paleontologist Eugene S. Richardson.

== Description ==
Eugeneodus had jaws lined with flattened, rectangular teeth termed pavement teeth, which had sharp edges and a series of ridges along their edge. Unlike in some of its relatives, these teeth didn't form sharp cutting blades. Along the midline of its Meckel's cartilages (lower jaws) was a row of teeth forming a tooth-whorl. The palatoquadrates (upper jaws) were not fused to the chondrocranium (braincase), but were relatively small and tightely braced against the skull. The body was fusiform, and the tail fin was lunate (crescent-shaped) and homocercal. No specimens of E. richardsoni preserve pelvic fins or claspers, and these are thought to have been absent in life. The internal skeleton of the tail fin consisted of neural and haemal arches, but unlike in other closely related fishes these were not fused together. Exteriorly, the body was covered by a coating of small placoid scales termed lepidomoria. These scales came in the form of both unfused, leaf-shaped scales and masses of fused scales all growing from the same base.

== Classification ==
Eugeneodus is the type genus of the family Eugeneodontidae and the broader order Eugeneodontiformes, which are named after the genus. The superfamily which includes Eugeneodontidae has been referred to as either Caseodontoidea or Eugeneodontoidei.

Eugeneodus was regarded as the most skeletally primitive eugeneodont by Zangerl.
