= Parahelicampodus =

Parahelicampodus Temporal range: Wuchiapingian, 260 Ma

Scientific classification
- Kingdom: Animalia
- Phylum: Chordata
- Class: Chondrichthyes
- Order: †Eugeneodontiformes
- Family: †Helicampodontidae
- Genus: †Parahelicampodus; Nielsen, 1952

Type species
- †Parahelicampodus sparcki

Genus of extinct shark-like fish

Parahelicampodus is an extinct genus of shark-like eugenodont fish. Fossils of Parahelicampodus have been uncovered in Eastern Greenland, which date to the Late Permian period.
