= Enameloid =

Mineralised tissue found in fish

Enameloid, also known as durodentine or vitrodentine, is an enamel-like tissue found in fish. It is the primary outer component of shark odontodes (teeth and dermal denticles), and modified forms of enameloid also occur in the teeth and scales of actinopterygian (ray finned) fishes and stem-group gnathostomes (jawed vertebrates). In extinct, armored jawless vertebrates such as heterostracans, enameloid forms the outer component of shell-like dermal armor. Although the origin of enameloid is debated, it is probably homologous to dentine rather than true enamel, despite its enamel-like strength and development. The term covers any hyper-mineralized tissue with an organic "scaffold" consisting of ectodermal and ectomesenchymal proteins.
