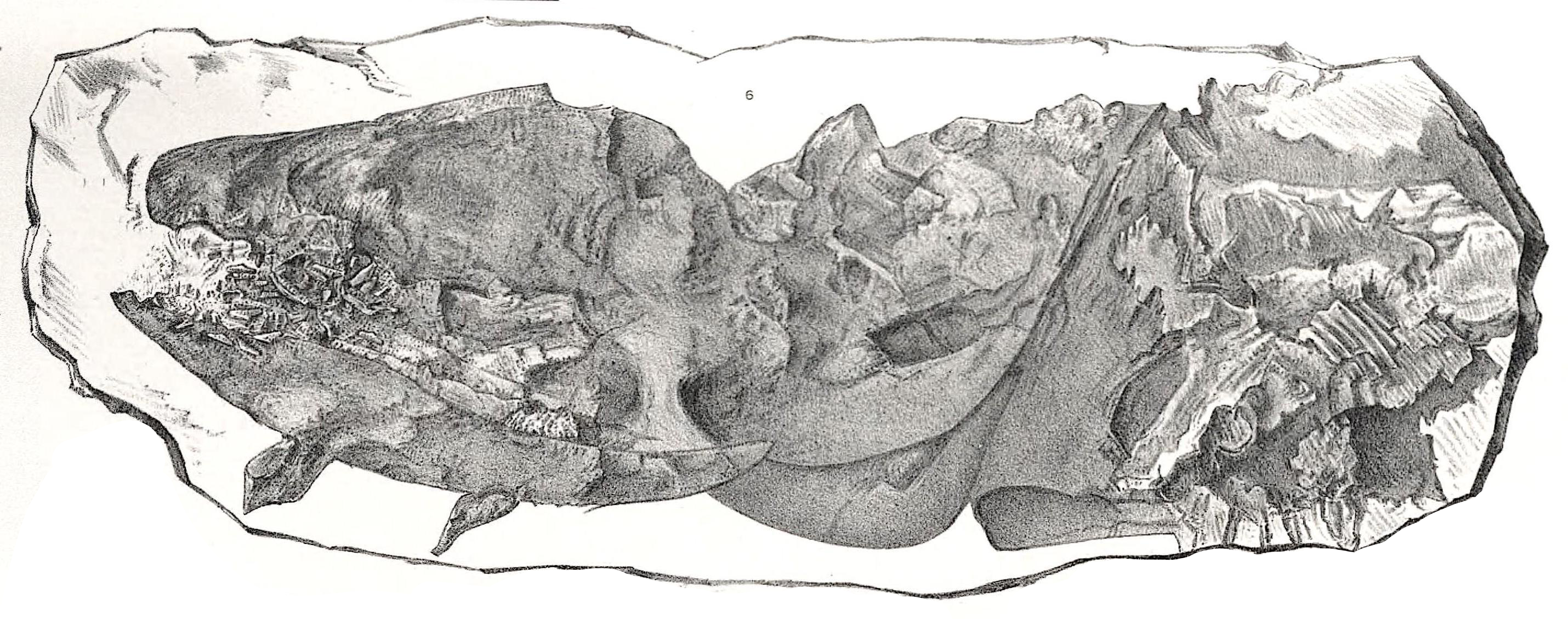
- Holotype of Caseodus basalis
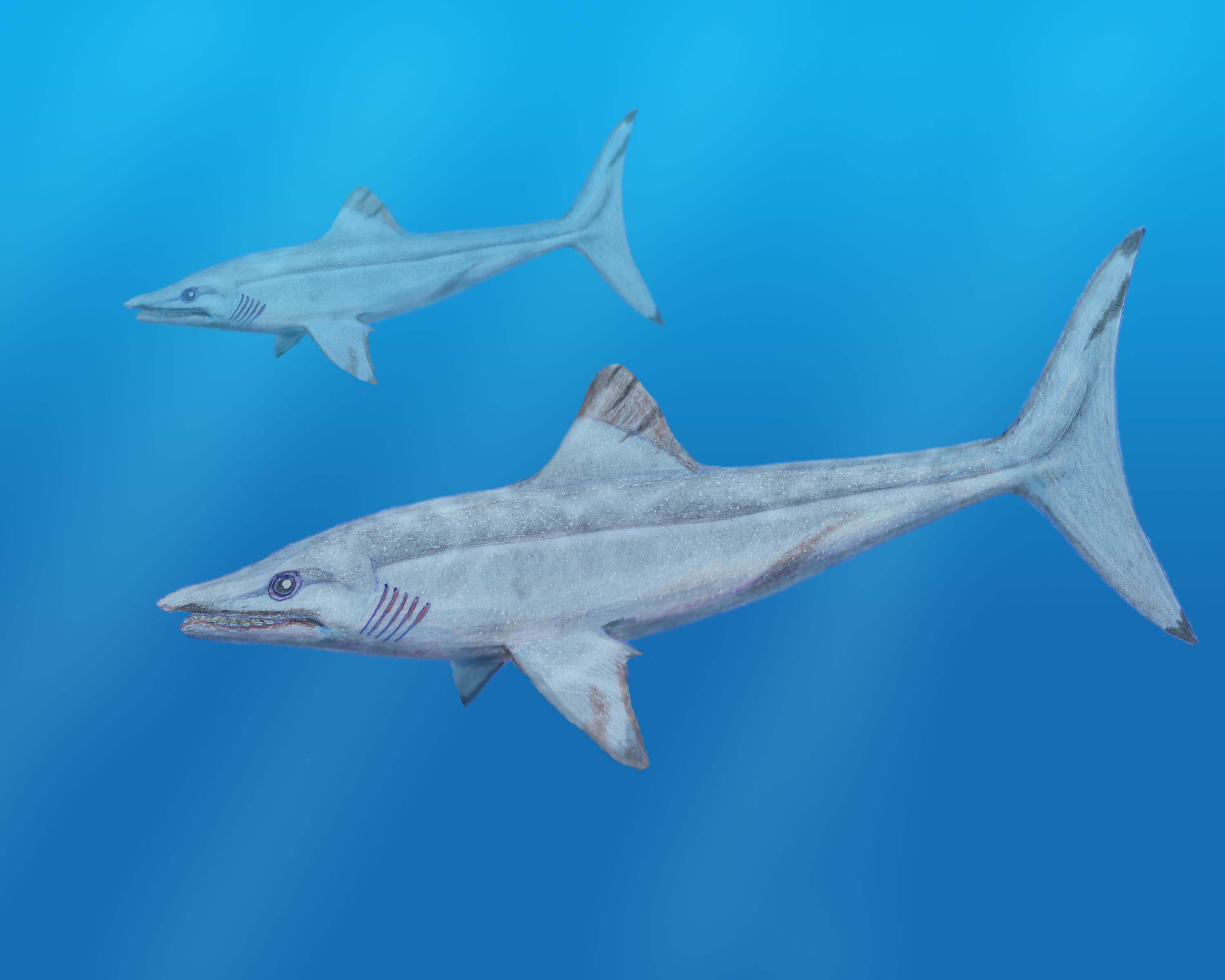
- Life reconstruction of Caseodus

Scientific classification
- Kingdom: Animalia
- Phylum: Chordata
- Class: Chondrichthyes
- Order: †Eugeneodontiformes
- Family: †Caseodontidae
- Genus: †Caseodus; Zangerl, 1981

Type species
- Orodus basalis (Cope, 1894)

Species
- †C. basalis Cope, 1894; †C. eatoni Zangerl, 1981; †C. varidentis? Mutter & Neumann, 2008

= Caseodus =

Caseodus Temporal range: Carboniferous - Early Triassic? 355–247.2 Ma

Extinct genus of cartilaginous fish

Caseodus is an extinct genus of eugeneodont from the Carboniferous of what is now the Midwestern United States, and potentially the Early Triassic of what is now British Columbia, Canada. The genus contains two Carboniferous species, C. basalis and C. eatoni, which are differentiated by the anatomy of their teeth but are otherwise identical. A third species, C. varidentis, is known from the Early Triassic Sulphur Mountain Formation, but due to its wildly different skull and tooth morphology it is questionable if it belongs in the genus. The genus name is in honor of paleoichthyologist Gerard Case, and the type species was originally placed in the genus Orodus.

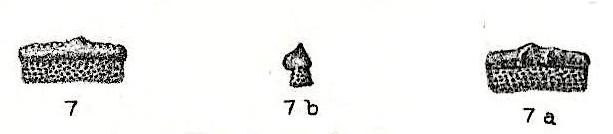
Teeth of Caseodus basalis

All species in the genus grew to approximately 1–1.5 m (3.3–4.9 ft) in length. The Carboniferous species had upper jaws which supported teeth and a row of fused teeth (termed a tooth-whorl) along the midline of the lower jaw. The Triassic species entirely lacked upper jaws and had an elongated projection, termed a rostrum, which extended from the lower jaw and supported the lower tooth-whorl. Caseodus varidentis (if included in the genus) is one of the few eugeneodontid genera that survived the end-Permian mass extinction event, and is one of the last surviving genera of this clade.
