= 1983 in paleontology =

Paleontology or palaeontology is the study of prehistoric life forms on Earth through the examination of plant and animal fossils. This includes the study of body fossils, tracks (ichnites), burrows, cast-off parts, fossilised feces (coprolites), palynomorphs and chemical residues. Because humans have encountered fossils for millennia, paleontology has a long history both before and after becoming formalized as a science. This article records significant discoveries and events related to paleontology that occurred or were published in the year 1983.

== Plants ==
=== Conifers ===
Name	Novelty	Status	Authors	Age	Unit	Location	Notes	Images
Pinus driftwoodensis	sp. nov	valid	Stockey	Early Eocene	Driftwood Canyon Provincial Park	Canada; British Columbia	A Pine species	

=== Angiosperms ===
Name	Novelty	Status	Authors	Age	Unit	Location	Notes	Images
Ensete oregonense	Sp nov	valid	Manchester & Kress	Middle Eocene	Clarno Formation	USA; Oregon	A banana species.	

== Arthropods ==
=== Crustaceans ===
Name	Novelty	Status	Authors	Age	Unit	Location	Notes	Images
Protastacus	Gen nov	Valid	Albrecht	Early Cretaceous (Berriasian-Hauterivian)		Germany	An astacidean crayfish. The type species is Astacus politus (1868); Genus also includes P. antiquus.	

==== Crustacean research ====
- Albrecht (1983) reappraises the relationships of some fossil crustaceans and erects the family Protastacidae.

=== Insects ===
Name	Novelty	Status	Authors	Age	Unit	Location	Notes	Images
Mastotermes electromexicus	sp. nov	valid	Krishna & Emerson	Late Oligocene - Early Miocene	Mexican amber	Mexico	first new world species of Mastotermes	
Polanskiella	Gen et sp nov	jr synonym	Rossi de Garcia	Middle Eocene	Ventana Formation	Argentina	Extinct Myrmeciin ant genus, jr synonym of type species Archimyrmex, sole species A. smekali	
Armaniidae	Fam. nov	jr synonym	Dlussky	Cenomanian - Turonian			Stem-ants, jr synonym of Sphecomyrminae (in part)	

== Fish ==
=== Cartilaginous fish ===
Name	Novelty	Status	Authors	Age	Unit	Location	Notes	Images
Anachronistes	Gen. et. sp. nov	Jr. synonym	Duffin & Ward	Late Carboniferous - Early Permian	Eyam Limestone	United Kingdom	Type species is Anachronistes fordi, genus now deemed a junior synonym of Cooleyella	

==== Cartilaginous fish research ====
- Duffin & Ward (1983) erect the family Anachronistidae for their new genus Anachronistes, which would later become a junior synonym of Cooleyella.

== Reptiles ==
=== Archosauromorphs ===
==== Dinosaurs ====
Data courtesy of George Olshevsky's dinosaur genera list.

Name	Status	Authors		Country	Image
Adasaurus		Rinchen Barsbold			Adasaurus mongoliensis
"Changtusaurus"	Nomen nudum.	Zhao Xijin			
Chungkingosaurus	Valid taxon	Dong Zhiming; Zhou S.	Zhang Y. H.		
"Damalasaurus"	Nomen nudum.	Zhao Xijin			
Enigmosaurus	Valid taxon	Rinchen Barsbold	Perle		
Gongbusaurus	Valid taxon	Dong Zhiming; Zhou S.	Zhang Y. H.		
"Lancanjiangosaurus"	Nomen nudum.	Zhao Xijin			
"Megacervixosaurus"	Nomen nudum.	Zhao Xijin			
"Microdontosaurus"	Nomen nudum.	Zhao Xijin			
"Ngexisaurus"	Nomen nudum.	Zhao Xijin			
Ornatotholus	Possible junior synonym of Stegoceras.	Peter Galton	Hans-Dieter Sues		
Quaesitosaurus	Valid taxon	Sergei Kurzanov	Bannikov		
Shamosaurus	Valid taxon	Tumanova			
Shunosaurus	Valid taxon	Dong Zhiming, Zhou S.	Zhang Y. H.		
Stygimoloch	Valid taxon	Peter Galton	Hans-Dieter Sues		
Ultrasaurus	Nomen dubium.	Kim H. M.			
Xiaosaurus	Valid taxon	Dong Zhiming	Tang Z.		
Zizhongosaurus	Valid taxon	Dong Zhiming, Zhou S.	Zhang Y. H.		

===== Birds =====
Name	Status	Novelty	Authors	Age	Unit	Location	Notes	Images
Capitonides protractus	Valid	Gen et sp nov.	Peter Ballmann	Middle Miocene	MN 6	Germany	A Lybiidae	
Diogenornis fragilis	Valid	Gen. nov. et Sp. nov.	Herculano M. F. de Alvarenga	Late Paleocene	Bacia calcária de Itaboraí	Brazil	An Opisthodactylidae	
Elaphrocnemus brodkorbi	Valid	Sp. nov.	Cécile Mourer-Chauviré	Eocene or Oligocene	Phosphorites du Quercy, MP 16-28	France	An Idiornithidae transferred to Talantatos brodkorbi in 2002 not followed here.	
Fluviatilavis	Valid	Gen. nov. et Sp. nov.	Colin J. O. Harrison	Early Eocene	Silveirinha Formation	Portugal	Aves incertae sedis pending restudy, this is the type species of the new genus.	
Horezmavis	Valid	Gen. nov. et Sp. nov.	Lev A. Nessov	Late Albian	Khodzhakul Formation	USSR: Uzbekistan	An Ornithuromorphae Incertae Sedis, this is the type species of the new genus.	
Idiornis itardiensis	Valid	Sp. nov.	Mourer-Chauviré	Middle Eocene or Oligocene	Messel pit, Phosphorites du Quercy	Germany; France	An Idiornithidae, moved to Dynamopterus itardiensis in 2013.	
Judinornis nogontsavensis	Valid	Gen. et Sp. nov.	Lev A. Nessov L. J. Borkin	Late Campanian-Early Maastrichtian,	Nemegt Formation	Mongolia	A Hesperornithiformes, Baptornithidae; this is the type species of the new genus.	
Oblitavis insolitus	Valid	Gen. nov et Sp. nov.	Cécile Mourer-Chauviré	Eocene or Oligocene	Phosphorites du Quercy	France	An Idiornithidae, transferred to the genus Propelargus insolitus in 2002.	
Oligostrix rupelensis	Valid	Gen. nov. et Sp. nov.	Karlheinz Fischer	Middle Oligocene		Germany	A Protostrigidae, type species O. rupelensis	
Tasidyptes	Valid?	Gen. nov. et Sp. nov.	Gerard F. van Tets Sue O'Connor	Holocene, ± 1400-800 BP	Kitchen midden	Australia: Tasmania	A Spheniscidae, type species T. hunteri. possibly nomen dubium.	
Tereingaornis moiseleyi	Valid	Gen. nov. et Sp. nov.	Ron J. Scarlett	Waipipian		New Zealand	A Spheniscidae, this is the type species of the new genus.	

==== Pterosaurs ====
===== New taxa =====
Name	Status	Authors	Notes
Angustinaripterus	Valid	He Xinlu et al.	
Preondactylus	Valid	Wild	
