= Iniopteryx =

Iniopteryx Temporal range: Pennsylvanian, 300 Ma
- Life restoration of a male Iniopteryx rushlaui

Scientific classification
- Kingdom: Animalia
- Phylum: Chordata
- Class: Chondrichthyes
- Subclass: Holocephali
- Order: †Iniopterygiformes
- Family: †Iniopterygidae
- Genus: †Iniopteryx; Zangerl & Case, 1973

Type species
- Iniopteryx rushlaui Zangerl & Case, 1973

Species
- Iniopteryx tedwhitei Zangerl & Case, 1973

Extinct genus of cartilaginous fishes

Iniopteryx ("Nape Wing") is an extinct genus of cartilaginous fish known from the Pennsylvanian sub-period of the Carboniferous period. Fossils of Iniopteryx are known from the U.S. states of Nebraska and Indiana.

== Discovery and naming ==
Iniopteryx was described in 1973 by paleontologists Rainer Zangerl and Gerard Case as the type species of the family Iniopterygidae within the order Iniopterygiformes (then termed Iniopterygia). The genus is based on multiple well-preserved and articulated fossils from the Stark Shale and Wea Shale of Nebraska, and the Excello Shale and Logan Quarry Shale of Indiana. It is known from the Pennsylvanian subperiod of the Carboniferous period. The holotype of I. rushlaui is the specimen FMNH PF6678, which is an articulated, nearly complete skeleton. The holotype of I. tedwhitei, FMNH PF7241, is also an articulated specimen, although the rear portion of the body is fragmentary. Fossils of Iniopteryx rushlaui are noted to be significantly more common that I. tedwhitei in the original description of both genera. Many specimens of I. rushlaui were studied using radiographic imaging, although it was not possible to study specimens from locales in Nebraska using radiography due to the composition of the rock matrix.

The genus name, Iniopteryx, is derived from the Greek roots iníon, meaning "nape", and pteryx, meaning "fin". This refers to the fish's enlarged, dorsally placed pectoral fins. I. rushlaui is named in honor of William Rushlau, while I. tedwhitei is named in honor of W. D. White. Both men were responsible for collecting large amounts of Iniopteryx material, and Rushlau was responsible for discovering the holotype specimen of I. rushlaui.

== Description ==
Articulated remains of Iniopteryx are known which are preserved in both dorsoventral (above/below) and lateral (side) views, and often consist of nearly complete skeletons. Both male and female individuals have been found, but males are significantly more common and better known. PF6678 and PF6645 are the largest specimens of Iniopteryx and are between 30 and 35 centimeters in length. The internal skeleton of Iniopteryx was made up of calcified cartilage.

=== Skull and teeth ===
The skull anatomy of Iniopteryx was characterized as poorly known in its original description, as despite many skulls being known their state of preservation made them difficult to study. In I. rushlaui, the braincase narrows towards the nasal openings. The eye sockets were positioned behind the nasal openings, and housed large eyes which had sclerotic rings made up of calcified cartilage. The skull greatly widens at the point where the palatoquadrates (upper jaws) articulate with the Meckel's cartilages (lower jaws). The Meckel's cartilages are slender and do not fuse at the symphysis (midline). In the original description of the genus, Zangerl and Case considered the jaw suspension to be holostylic (also termed autostylic), with the palatoquadrates entirely fused to the braincase. However, later research by paleontologist Barbara J. Stahl found that the palatoquadrates were not fused to the braincase, and that the jaw suspension was not holostylic. Unfused palatoquadrates have since been observed in other members of the family Iniopterygidae. The gills of Iniopteryx were positioned beneath the skull. Three of the gill arches were covered in additional rows of denticles which were largest on the rearmost gill arch. Iniopteryx had rays of calcified cartilage protruding from the ventral (lower) side of the skull, which most likely represent hyoid radials which supported a soft, fleshy operculum.

The dentition of Iniopteryx consisted of small denticles with hook-shaped cusps, which may have been made up of orthodentine. The size and shape of these denticles varied in different regions of the mouth, and some denticles had small protrusions termed cusplets. The pulp cavities of these denticles did not consist of trabecular dentine, a form of dentine which normally appears at the base of chondrichthyan teeth. In addition to the denticles, Iniopteryx also had tooth whorls (arching rows of tooth crowns) at the symphyses of the palatoquadrates and the Meckel's cartilages. The bases (equivalent to roots) of the teeth making up the whorls were unfused, unlike in other iniopterygians in which they were fused together.

=== Postcranial skeleton ===
Similarly to the skull, the postcrania of I. rushlaui has been characterized as difficult to study. Zangerl and Case identified at least 40 vertebrae in I. rushlaui. The vertebrae of Iniopteryx lack a vertebral centra, a similar condition to modern chimaeroids; however, unlike living chimaeras, Iniopteryx lacked a vertebral column made up of calcified rings and had an entirely uncalcified notochord. Neural and haemal arches protruded from the vertebral column, which were more weakly calcified towards the tail.

Life restoration of a female Iniopteryx sp.

Each pectoral fin consists of a large basal plate which articulates with the scapulocoracoids (pectoral girdle) and supports at least eleven fin rays. The first ray is enlarged in both males and females, but is significantly larger in males and is covered by large denticles. In I. rushlaui, these denticles resemble hooks, with recurved, forward-pointing crowns and deep, tubular bases, while in I. tedwhitei these denticles have straight, slender crowns and "saddle-shaped" bases. Behind the enlarged first ray are at least ten fin rays which slowly decrease in length and width towards the last. Two or three fin rays towards the posterior (rear) side of the fin bear rodlets of calcified cartilage that protrude at right angles from the fin rays. The pectoral fins articulate with the upper portion of the scapulocoracoid, giving the appearance that they protrude from the nape of the neck.

The pelvic girdle consists of two small, unfused cartilages and is unknown in any female specimens. The pelvic fins are supported by a triangular plate of cartilage called the basipterygium, and by ceratotrichia (soft, ray-like cartilaginous structures which support the fins). The basipterygium of male Iniopteryx also supported a large, recurved denticle that acted as a tenaculum similar in function (but not anatomy) to that of chimaeras. The claspers (paired reproductive organs) of male Iniopteryx consisted of long rods made up of at least 15 cartilaginous segments.

Iniopteryx had a single dorsal fin located above the pelvic region, which was supported by a plate of cartilage. The caudal fin skeleton was rounded, with symmetrical upper and lower lobes (termed diphycercal) and a cartilaginous plate at its tip. Iniopteryx, like other iniopterygians, lacked an anal fin. The caudal fin itself was supported by fine cartilage rays.

== Classification ==
Iniopteryx is the type genus of the Iniopterygiformes, a clade of chondrichthyans variously considered as stem-holocephalans or as stem-group chondrichthyans sister to the clade containing Elasmobranchii and Holocephali. Of these interpretations, the former is better supported in recent literature. Within Iniopterygiformes, Iniopteryx is a member of the Iniopterygidae, characterized by a non-holostylic jaw suspension and Meckel's cartilages not fused at the symphysis. The internal phylogeny of the Iniopterygiformes according to Zangerl and Case (1973), Zangerl (1997), and Grogan and Lund (2009) is as follows.

Family Iniopterygidae:

- Iniopteryx
  - Iniopteryx rushlaui Zangerl & Case, 1973
  - Iniopteryx tedwhitei Zangerl & Case, 1973
- Promexyele
  - Promexyele peyeri Zangerl & Case, 1973
  - Promexyele bairdi Zangerl & Case, 1973
- Cervifurca
  - Cervifurca nasuta Zangerl, 1981
- Rainerichthys
  - Rainerichthys zangerli Grogan & Lund, 2009
- Papilionichthys
  - Papilionichthys stahlae Grogan & Lund, 2009

Family Sibyrhynchidae:

- Sibyrhynchus
  - Sibyrhynchus denisoni Zangerl & Case, 1973
- Iniopera
  - Iniopera richardsoni Zangerl & Case, 1973
- Inioxyele
  - Inioxyele whitei Zangerl & Case, 1973

== Paleobiology ==
=== Locomotion ===
The large size and position of the pectoral fins in Iniopteryx suggests that they were the primary means of locomotion. The pectoral fins likely would have moved vertically in a similar manner to the flight stroke of a bird, and were compared to the forelimbs of a sea turtle by Zangerl and Case. The large, fused basal plates of the pectoral fins likely anchored large muscles. The caudal fin acted as a rudder, and the dorsal and pelvic fins acted as stabilizers. Iniopteryx likely used its caudal fin for propulsion when swimming slowly.

=== Diet ===
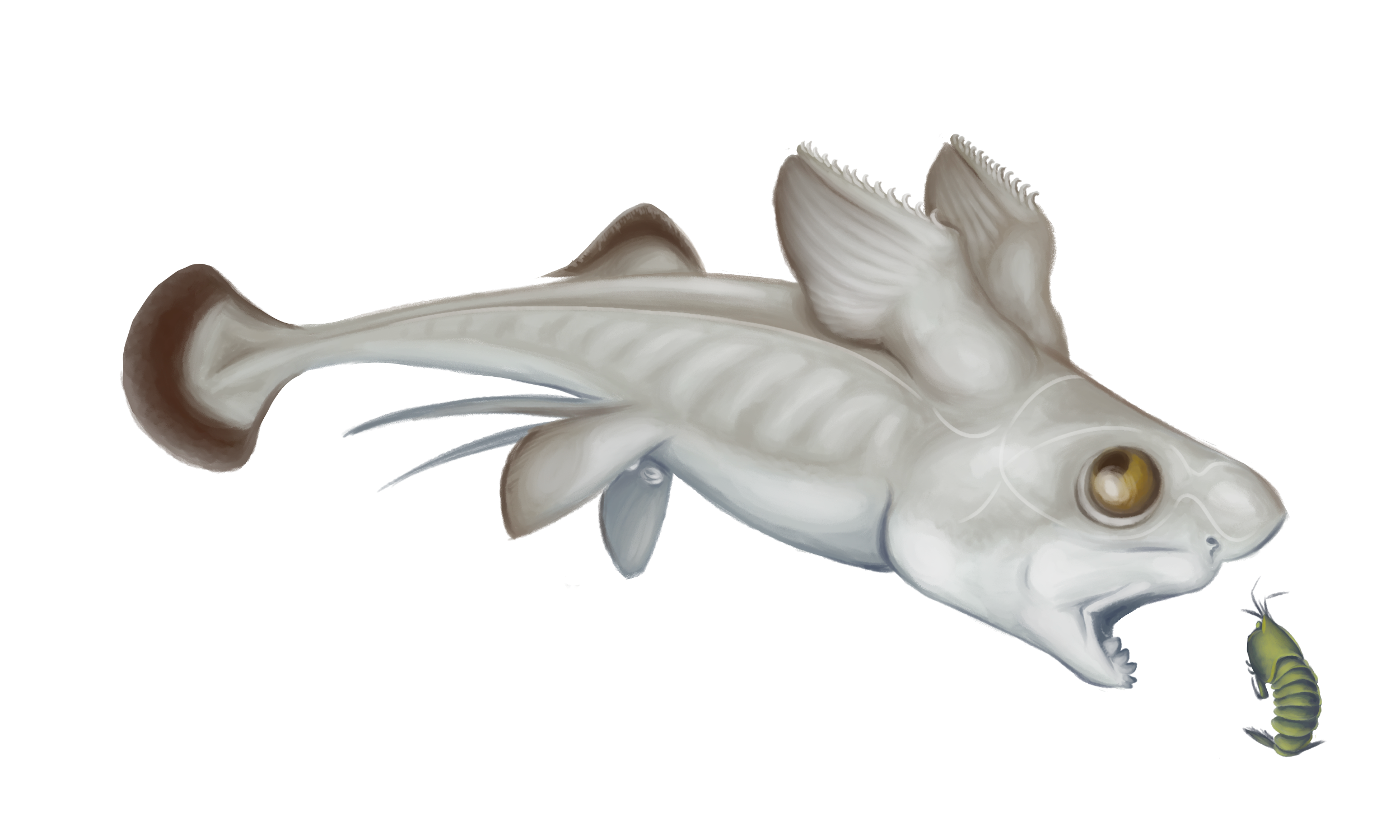
A male Iniopteryx rushlaui hunting a basal stomatopod

The teeth of Iniopteryx were small and fragile, which Zangerl and Case suggest limited it to a diet of soft food. A number of articulated specimens preserve an infill of the mineral hydroxyapatite in the stomach cavity, and in some specimens (PF6672 and PF6646) this infill contains arthropod exoskeletons, conodonts, and plant matter. In other specimens (PF6645), the infill contains only a blue-gray, striated substance. Zangerl and Case suggested that the blue-gray infills represents casts of the inner surface of the intestine, and that the hydroxyapatite infills represent gut contents.

=== Sex ratio ===
Among Zangerl and Case (1973)'s original sample of 56 specimens of Iniopteryx rushlaui, only seven were females. The authors theorized that this may have been caused by an increased rate of predation among the females, as the males could have used their denticle-covered pectoral fins for defense.

== Paleoenvironment ==
The Stark Shale, where the type specimen of I. rushlaui originated, and the Wea Shale, where the type specimen of I. tedwhitei originated, were deposited in deep-water, offshore environments with calm, anoxic bottom waters caused by a thermocline (temperature gradient) and halocline (salinity gradient). These sites are considered Konservat-Lagerstätten, meaning that fossils collected from the site are exceptionally well preserved. In addition to Iniopteryx, a wide array of chondrichthyans are known from the sites, including other iniopterygians such as Promexyele and Iniopera, eugeneodonts (whorl-toothed sharks) such as Romerodus, Gilliodus, and Agassizodus, the ctenacanthiform Heslerodus, the symmoriiform Cobelodus, and the enigmatic dermal denticles of Listracanthus. Other organisms, including conodonts, palaeoniscoid bony fish, crinoids, jellyfish medusae, brachiopods, bryozoans, bivalves, gastropods, coleoids and ammonoid cephalopods, and the tyrannophontid mantis shrimps Tyrannophontes and Gorgonophontes are also known from the Stark and Wea shales.

In contrast, the Logan Quarry and the Excello Shale were deposited in a highly productive, shallow-water environment with seasonal changes in rainfall, warm temperatures, anoxic bottom water, and abundant organic material in the form of both dense mats of floating marine vegetation and abundant land plant remains. In these localities, Iniopteryx would have similarly coexisted with other chondrichthyans, including other iniopterygians such as Promexyele, Cervifurca, Sibyrhynchus, and Iniopera, the small eugeneodonts Caseodus and Ornithoprion, the symmoriiforms Denaea and Stethacanthulus, and Petrodus and Listracanthus denticles. Palaeoniscoid and chondrostean bony fish, the acanthodian Acanthodes, a rhipidistian lobe-finned fish, and conodonts made up the remainder of the vertebrate community, and nautiloids, ammonoids, gastropods, bivalves, arthropods, crinoids, annelids, bryozoans, brachiopods, the rugose coral Lophophyllidium proliferum, and sponges made up the invertebrate community. Iniopteryx and other iniopterygians may have been open-ocean visitors to these basin environments, rather than full-time residents.
