= Khuff Formation =

Geologic formation in the Middle East

- Stratigraphic range: Middle Permian (?Capitanian) to early Triassic
- Type: Geological formation
- Unit of: Akhdar Group
- Sub-units: From youngest to oldest: Khartam Member; Midhnab Member; Duhaysan Member; Huqayl Member; Ash Siqqah Member
- Underlies: Sudair Formation
- Overlies: Gharif Formation
- Thickness: 171.4 m (562.2 ft) (type section); 1,110 m (3,641 ft) (northern Oman)

Location
- Region: Middle East
- Country: Oman; Saudi Arabia

Type section
- Named by: Steineke et al.
- Year defined: 1958

The Khuff Formation is a geologic formation in Oman and Saudi Arabia. It preserves fossils dating back to the Permian and early Triassic periods.

== Stratigraphy ==
Depending on the author, various definitions and names for the members of the Khuff Formation have been proposed, which may lead to confusion. Vaslet et al. (2005) defines the members as such (from oldest to youngest):

The Al Siqqah Member is the oldest of the members, tentatively dated to the middle Permian (Capitanian). It is 35 meters thick at the type section, becoming thinner to the southeast. It has previously been referred to as the Unayzah Formation or Unayzah Member.

The Huqayl Member has been dated to the late Permian (?Wuchiapingian) based on foraminifer assemblage. It ranges from 30 to 40 meters in thickness.

The Duhaysan Member is 13.4 meters thick at Jabal Duhaysan, and is believed to be late Permian (Wuchiapingian-Changhsingian) in age.

The Midhnab Member (or Midhnab Shale) is believed to date to the Changhsingian and is about 60 meters thick in the Ad Dawadimi quadrangle.

The Khartam Member (formerly the Khartam Limestone) is the youngest member, with the lower part dating to the latest Permian and the upper part to the early Triassic.

== Depositional environment ==
The Khuff Formation was deposited on the outer shelf of the Arabian Platform and represents a shallow carbonate platform, with a coastline oriented northeast-southwest and facing the spreading Neotethys Ocean. The various units have been interpreted as lagoonal tidal sand flats or barrier beaches, outer-shelf conditions below storm wave base and deposition around storm wave base. The known fossil content supports the interpretation of the Khuff Formation as a marine environment. The presence of Tethyan brachiopods suggest a subtropical and warm climate, while cosmopolitan, endemic and Gondwanan brachiopod taxa indicate the area was open to outside influence, and the conodont fauna confirms a shallow marine habitat.

== Fossil content ==
=== Fish ===
==== Cartilaginous fish ====
A large number of chondrichthyan dermal denticles are known from the formation.

Cartilaginous fish reported from the Khuff Formation
Genus	Species	Location	Stratigraphic member	Material	Notes	Images
Amelacanthus	A. cf. sulcatus	Haushi-Huqf area (Oman).		25 spine fragments.	A ctenacanth.	
Anachronistidae?	Gen. et. sp. indeterminate	Haushi-Huqf area (Oman).		2 teeth.	A potential anachronistid.	
Cooleyella	C. cf. fordi	Haushi-Huqf area (Oman).		2 teeth.	An anachronistid.	
Deltodus	D. aff. mercurei	Haushi-Huqf area (Oman).		24 tooth plates.	A cochliodontiform.	
Eugeneodontiformes?	Gen. et. sp. indeterminate	Haushi-Huqf area (Oman).		2 tooth crowns.	A likely eugeneodont.	
Euselachii incertae sedis		Haushi-Huqf area (Oman).		10 teeth.	A potential protacrodontid.	
Glikmanius	G. culmenis	Haushi-Huqf area (Oman).		137 teeth.	A ctenacanth.	
Glikmanius	G. cf. myachkovensis	Haushi-Huqf area (Oman).		649 teeth.	A ctenacanth.	
Gunnellodus	G. bellistriatus	Haushi-Huqf area (Oman).		254 teeth.	A hybodont.	
Khuffia	K. lenis	Haushi-Huqf area (Oman).		79 teeth.	A sphenacanthid.	
Khuffia	K. prolixa	Haushi-Huqf area (Oman).		27 teeth.	A sphenacanthid.	
Nemacanthus	N. sp.	Haushi-Huqf area (Oman).		2 dorsal spine fragments.	A palaeospinacid.	
Omanoselache	O. angiolinii	Haushi-Huqf area (Oman).		86 teeth.	A hybodont.	
Omanoselache	O. hendersoni	Haushi-Huqf area (Oman).		717 teeth.	A hybodont.	
Omanoselache	cf. O. sp.	Haushi-Huqf area (Oman).		14 teeth.	A hybodont.	
cf. 'Paleozoic Genus 1' sp.		Haushi-Huqf area (Oman).		A tooth.	A hybodont, potential lochidiid.	
Petalodontiformes?	Gen. et. sp. indeterminate	Haushi-Huqf area (Oman).		2 broken teeth.	Similar to Chomatodus.	
Reesodus	R. underwoodi	Haushi-Huqf area (Oman).		6 teeth.	A hybodont.	
Solenodus	S. cf. crenulatus	Haushi-Huqf area (Oman).		4 tooth plates.	A cochliodontiform.	
Teresodus	T. amplexus	Haushi-Huqf area (Oman).		103 teeth.	A hybodont.	

==== Conodonts ====
Conodonts reported from the Khuff Formation
Genus	Species	Location	Stratigraphic member	Material	Notes	Images
"Jinogondolella"	"J." cf. altaduensis	Jabal al Murayrah (Saudi Arabia).	Midhnab Member.	1 specimen.	A gondolellid.	

=== Invertebrates ===
==== Brachiopods ====
Brachiopods reported from the Khuff Formation
Genus	Species	Location	Stratigraphic member	Material	Notes	Images
Kotlaia	K. sp. ind.	Saudi Arabia.	Midhnab Member.	An articulated specimen & a dorsal valve.	An enteletoid.	
Omanilasma	O. desertica	Haushi ring (Oman).		29 articulated specimens.	A terebratulidan.	
Omanilasma	O. husseinii	Oman & Saudi Arabia.	Midhnab Member.	Over 200 specimens.	A terebratulidan.	

==== Cephalopods ====
Cephalopods reported from the Khuff Formation
Genus	Species	Location	Stratigraphic member	Material	Notes	Images
Tirolonautilus	T. feltgeni	South of Jabal al Amshiyah (Saudi Arabia).	Lower Khartam Member.	Internal mould.	A tainoceratid nautiloid.	
Tirolonautilus	T. hoernesi	East of Safra ad Dumaythiyat (Saudi Arabia).	Lower Midhnab Member.	Internal mould.	A tainoceratid nautiloid.	

== See also ==
- List of fossiliferous stratigraphic units
