= Pirodus =

Pirodus Temporal range: Carboniferous Moscovian

Scientific classification
- Kingdom: Animalia
- Phylum: Chordata
- Class: Chondrichthyes
- Subclass: Holocephali
- Order: †Eugeneodontiformes
- Family: †Caseodontidae
- Genus: †Pirodus
- Species: †P. conicus

Binomial name
- †Pirodus conicus Lebedev, 2001

Extinct genus of cartilaginous fish

Pirodus (meaning 'Pirochi tooth') is an extinct genus of cartilaginous fish from the Carboniferous of Russia. It is classified as a member of the order Eugeneodontiformes and the family Caseodontidae. The genus includes a single species, P. conicus, which is known only from a single, incomplete fossil of its teeth. These teeth were fused together and sat along the midline of the jaw, and were surrounded by fused dermal denticles.

== Discovery ==
The holotype and only specimen of Pirodus conicus was described by researcher Oleg Lebedev in a 2001 paper, and originated from the Shchurovo-Korobcheyevo Formation of Moscow Oblast, Russia. This locality has been dated to the Moscovian stage of the Carboniferous period. The holotype specimen is in the collection of the Paleontological Institute, Russian Academy of Sciences and is catalogued as PIN 2804/328.

The genus is named after the village of Пирочи (Pirochi), which is near where the only known specimen was found, combined with the Greek suffix ὀδούς or odoús, meaning 'tooth'. The name of the type and only species, P. conicus, is derived from the Latin conicus, and refers to the shape of its teeth.

== Description ==
Pirodus is known from a single fragment of a tooth-whorl surrounded by dermal denticles, which is about 17 millimeters (0.67 in) in height. The tooth-whorl of this taxon was an unpaired structure positioned along the midline of the jaw, and consisted of a single fused base (or root) with multiple flattened, overlapping crowns protruding from it. The tooth crowns were conical, rather than bulbous and rounded like in related genera. The denticles of the taxon are large and pointed, and those around the margins of the tooth-whorl may have been fused to the teeth.

The tooth crowns are composed of a form of dentin termed tubular dentin, while the base is composed of a form called trabecular dentin.

== Classification ==
Pirodus is a member of the family Caseodontidae and the order Eugeneodontiformes (alternatively referred to as the synonymous order Edestida). Oleg Lebedev noted that the appearance of the tooth-whorl is most similar to that of the caseodont genus Ornithoprion.
