= Eyam Limestone =

Geologic formation in England

- Stratigraphic range: Early Carboniferous (Uppermost Viséan), 336–326.4 Ma
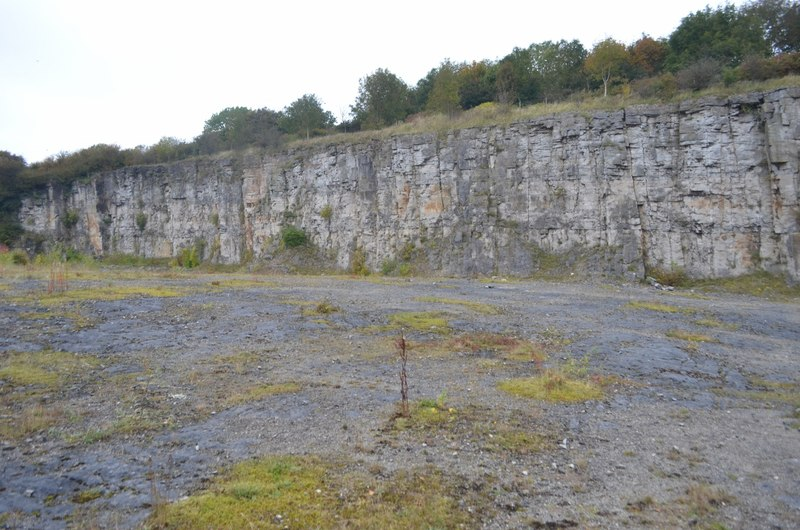
- Eyam Limestone in Wirksworth
- Type: Geological formation
- Unit of: Peak Limestone Group
- Underlies: Longstone Mudstone Formation
- Overlies: Monsal Dale Limestone Formation
- Area: Derbyshire
- Thickness: 9 to 54 m

Lithology
- Primary: Limestone

Location
- Region: England
- Country: United Kingdom
- Extent: Peak District

Type section
- Named for: Eyam

The Eyam Limestone (formerly known as the Cawdor Group, Cawdor Limestone or Eyam Group) is a geologic formation in the Peak District, England. It preserves fossils dating back to the Viséan stage of the Carboniferous period, and represents a marine environment.

== Depositional environment ==
At the time of deposition, Britain was just south of the equator (<5° S) and part of the Euramerica continent. Study of the growth rings of fossil wood from other localities indicate that the British Isles had a monsoonal climate during the early Carboniferous, with tropical rainfall seasonality. The Eyam Limestone was deposited on an extensive, thick carbonate ramp and platform on the northeast margin of the Widmerpool Gulf (an extensive basin which existed as an area of open water during the time of deposition). Reefs and their associated fore-reef and lagoonal environments are represented in the Eyam Limestone, with crinoids dominating the reef and providing habitats for other animals. The presence of photosymbiotic coral and micritic envelopes on some crinoid ossicles indicates the formation was deposited within the photic zone in a marine environment of normal salinity. The presence of the xenacanth Bransonella has been suggested to imply freshwater influence as xenacanths live mainly in freshwater habitats, however its presence in other marine formations suggests that Bransonella was a marine animal unlike its relatives.

Apatite crystals formed by the recrystallization of phosphatic overgrowths are present on some conodont elements from the formation. As phosphatogenesis only occurs in the anoxic-oxic boundary while apatite precipitation occurs in the top few centimeters of the sediment column, this reveals that shallow sediment with low geothermal temperatures and dysoxic conditions were present in the Eyam Limestone.

== Fossil content ==
Color key: Taxon / Reclassified taxon / Taxon falsely reported as present / Dubious taxon or junior synonym / Ichnotaxon / Ootaxon / Morphotaxon	Notes; Uncertain or tentative taxa are in small text; ~~crossed out~~ taxa are discredited.

=== Cartilaginous fish ===
Cartilaginous fish reported from the Eyam Limestone
Genus	Species	Presence	Material	Notes	Images
Acanthorhachis	A. cf. spinatus	Steeplehouse Quarry.	Basal body & spines.	A listracanthid.	
Anachronistes	A. fordi	Steeplehouse Quarry.	Teeth.	Junior synonym of Cooleyella.	
Bransonella	B. nebraskensis	Steeplehouse Quarry & Cawdor Quarry.	Teeth.	A xenacanth.	
Carcharopsis	C. prototypus	Steeplehouse Quarry & Coleshill Quarry.	Teeth.	A squatinactiform.	
Cladodus	C. sp.	Steeplehouse Quarry.	4 teeth.	A cladoselachid.	
Cooleyella	C. fordi	Steeplehouse Quarry & Cawdor Quarry.	Teeth.	An anachronistid.	
"Ctenacanthus"	"C." costellatus	Steeplehouse Quarry.	Partial tooth.	A ctenacanth.	
Ctenoptychius	C. lobatus	Steeplehouse Quarry.	3 teeth.	A petalodont.	
Cypripediodens	C. cristatus	Once-a-week Quarry.	Teeth.	A petalodont.	
Denaea	D. cf. fournieri	Steeplehouse Quarry & Cawdor Quarry.	Teeth.	A falcatid.	
Euchondrocephali gen. et. sp. indet.	Indeterminate	Cawdor Quarry.	Teeth.	Somewhat similar to orodontid teeth.	
Euselachii gen. et. sp. indet.	Indeterminate	Cawdor Quarry.	Tooth.	An indeterminate euselachian.	
Ginteria	G. fungiforma	Cawdor Quarry.	Teeth.	An anachronistid.	
Lissodus	L. wirksworthensis		Teeth.	Reassigned to the genus Reesodus.	
Petalorhynchus	P. psittacinus	Steeplehouse Quarry.	Crown & smaller tooth fragment.	A petalodont.	
Petrodus	P. patelliformis	Steeplehouse Quarry.	Thousands of dermal denticles.	A symmoriid and the most abundant vertebrate in the formation.	
Reesodus	R. wirksworthensis	Steeplehouse Quarry.	Tooth.	A hybodont.	
Saivodus	S. striatus	Steeplehouse Quarry.	Tooth.	A ctenacanth.	
Squatinactis	S. caudispinatus	Cawdor Quarry.	4 teeth.	A squatinactiform.	
Thrinacodus	T. dziki	Steeplehouse Quarry & Cawdor Quarry.	Teeth.	A phoebodont.	

=== Conodonts ===
Conodonts reported from the Eyam Limestone
Genus	Species	Presence	Material	Notes	Images
Gnathodus	G. girtyi	Steeplehouse Quarry.	Partial S element.	An idiognathodontid.	
?Hindeodus	?H. sp.	Steeplehouse Quarry.	P1 element fragment.	An anchignathodontid.	
?Idioprioniodus	?I. sp.	Steeplehouse Quarry.	Two P1 element fragments.	A prioniodinid.	
Kladognathus	K. sp.	Steeplehouse Quarry.	M element.	A coelodontid.	
Lochriea	L. commutata	Steeplehouse Quarry.	Two P1 elements.	A spathognathodontid.	
Lochriea	L. mononodosa	Steeplehouse Quarry.	P1 element.	A spathognathodontid.	
Lochriea	L. sp.	Steeplehouse Quarry.	Two P2 elements.	A spathognathodontid.	

=== Invertebrates ===
==== Arthropods ====
Arthropods reported from the Eyam Limestone
Genus	Species	Presence	Material	Notes	Images
Cummingella	C. cf. carringtonensis	Monyash.		A phillipsiid trilobite.	
Cummingella	C. sampsoni	Stoney Middleton & near Hassop.	Multiple specimens.	A phillipsiid trilobite.	
Cummingella	C. cf. tuberculingenata	Monyash.		A phillipsiid trilobite.	
Griffithides	G. whitewatsoni	Stoney Middleton.	Multiple specimens.	A proetid trilobite.	

==== Brachiopods ====
Brachiopods reported from the Eyam Limestone
Genus	Species	Presence	Material	Notes	Images
Acanthoplecta	A. mesoloba	Monyash.		A productid.	
Alitaria	A.? panderi	Monyash.		A productid.	
Alitaria	A. sp.	Monyash.		A productid.	
Antiquatonia	A. hindi	Monyash.		A productid.	
Antiquatonia	A. cf. hindi	Monyash.		A productid.	
Antiquatonia	A. cf. insculpta	Monyash.		A productid.	
Antiquatonia	A. sulcata	Monyash.		A productid.	
Antiquatonia	A. sp.	Monyash.		A productid.	
Avonia	A. aculeata	Monyash.		A productid.	
Avonia	A. davidsoni	Monyash.		A productid.	
Avonia	A. youngiana	Monyash.		A productid.	
Avonia	A. cf. youngiana	Monyash.		A productid.	
Avonia	A. sp.	Monyash.		A productid.	
Brachythyris	B. ovalis	Monyash.		A spiriferid.	
Brachythyris	B. cf. ovalis	Monyash.		A spiriferid.	
Buxtonia	B. sp.	Monyash.		A productid.	
Coledium	C. sp.	Monyash.		A rhynchonellid.	
Dictyoclostus	D. sp.	Monyash.		A productid.	
Echinoconchus	E. punctatus	Monyash.		A productid.	
Echinoconchus	E. subelegans	Monyash.		A productid.	
Eomarginifera	E. cf. lobata	Monyash.		A productid.	
Eomarginifera	E. longispinus	Monyash.		A productid.	
Fluctuaria	F. undata	Monyash.		A productid.	
Fusella	F. sp.	Monyash.		A spiriferid.	
Girtyella	G. sacculus	Monyash.		A terebratulid.	
Hustedia	H. ulothrix	Monyash.		An athyridid.	
Kochiproductus	K. sp.	Monyash.		A productid.	
Krotovia	K. spinulosa	Monyash.		A productid.	
Linoproductoidea indet.	Indeterminate	Monyash.		A productid.	
Linoprotonia	L. sp.	Monyash.		A productid.	
Marginicinctus	M. sp.	Monyash.		A productid.	
Marginiferoidea indet.	Indeterminate	Monyash.		A productid.	
Martinia	M. sp.	Monyash.		A spiriferid.	
Orthoidea indet.	Indeterminate	Monyash.		An orthid.	
Overtonia	O. fimbriata	Monyash.		A productid.	
Pleuropugnoides	P. pleurodon	Monyash.		A rhynchonellid.	
Pleuropugnoides	P. sp.	Monyash.		A rhynchonellid.	
Productina	P. margaritacaea	Monyash.		A productid.	
Productina	P. sp.	Monyash.		A productid.	
Productus	P. productus	Monyash.		A productid.	
Productus	P. sp.	Monyash.		A productid.	
Pugilis	P. cf. pugilis	Monyash.		A productid.	
Pugilis	P. sp.	Monyash.		A productid.	
Pugnax	P. acuminatus	Monyash.		A rhynchonellid.	
Pugnax	P.cordiformis	Monyash.		A rhynchonellid.	
Pugnax	P. pseudopugnus	Monyash.		A rhynchonellid.	
Pugnax	P. cf. pugnoides	Monyash.		A rhynchonellid.	
Pugnax	P. sp.	Monyash.		A rhynchonellid.	
Pustula	P. sp.	Monyash.		A productid.	
Rugosochonetes	R. sp.	Monyash.		A productid.	
Schizophoria	S. resupinata	Monyash.		An orthid.	
Schizophoria	S. sp.	Monyash.		An orthid.	
Sinuatella	S. cf. sinuata	Monyash.		A productid.	
Sinuatella	S. sp.	Monyash.		A productid.	
Spirifer	S. bisulcatus	Monyash.		A spiriferid.	
Spirifer	S. cf. bisulcatus	Monyash.		A spiriferid.	
Spirifer	S. planicostus	Monyash.		A spiriferid.	
Spirifer	S. triangularis	Monyash.		A spiriferid.	
Spiriferoidea indet.	Indeterminate	Monyash.		A spiriferid.	

==== Bryozoans ====
Bryozoans reported from the Eyam Limestone
Genus	Species	Presence	Material	Notes	Images
Fenestelloidea	Indeterminate	Monyash.			

==== Cnidarians ====
Cnidarians reported from the Eyam Limestone
Genus	Species	Presence	Material	Notes	Images
Diphyphyllum	D. sp.	Monyash.		A horn coral.	

==== Echinoderms ====
Echinoderms reported from the Eyam Limestone
Genus	Species	Presence	Material	Notes	Images
Crinoidea indet.	Indeterminate	Monyash.			

==== Molluscs ====
Molluscs reported from the Eyam Limestone
Genus	Species	Presence	Material	Notes	Images
Aviculopecten	A. interstitialis	Monyash.		A bivalve.	
Aviculopinna	A. mutica	Monyash.		A pinnid bivalve.	
Bivalvia indet.	Indeterminate	Monyash.		A bivalve.	
Conocardium	C. sp.	Monyash.		A rostroconch.	
Girtypecten	G. stellaris	Monyash.		A bivalve.	
Leiopteria	L. sp.	Monyash.		A bivalve.	
Parallelodon	P. sp.	Monyash.		A parallelodontid bivalve.	
Pinna	P. flabelliformis	Monyash.		A pinnid bivalve.	

== See also ==
- List of fossiliferous stratigraphic units in England
