= Turovella =

Turovella Temporal range: Carboniferous

Scientific classification
- Kingdom: Animalia
- Phylum: Chordata
- Class: Chondrichthyes
- Subclass: Elasmobranchii
- Family: †Anachronistidae
- Genus: †Turovella
- Species: †T. lebedevi

Binomial name
- †Turovella lebedevi Ivanov & Duffin, 2024

Extinct genus of cartilaginous fishes

Turovella is an extinct genus of anachronistid elasmobranch that lived during the Carboniferous period.

== Distribution ==
Turovella lebedevi, the type species, is known from fossils unearthed in Moscow Oblast, Russia.
