= Peak Limestone Group =

Rock strata in northern England

- Stratigraphic range: Courceyan to Brigantian substages of Carboniferous
- Type: Group
- Unit of: Carboniferous Limestone Supergroup
- Sub-units: Milldale, Woo Dale, Kevin, Hopedale, Ecton, Bee Low, Monsal Dale, Eyam and Ticknall limestone formations, Fallgate Volcanic Fmtn, Cloud Hill Dolostone Fmtn,
- Underlies: Craven Group
- Overlies: Devonian to Carboniferous anhydrites and dolomites locally but unconformable on lower Palaeozoic strata elsewhere
- Thickness: up to about 800m

Lithology
- Primary: limestone
- Other: mudstone, siltstone, lava

Location
- Region: Northern England, Midlands
- Country: England

Type section
- Named for: Peak District

The Peak Limestone Group is a Carboniferous lithostratigraphic group (a sequence of rock strata) in the Peak District of northern England and the north Midlands. The group largely comprises limestones, including biosparite and cherty micrite but also some subordinate mudstones, siltstones and dolomites. Basaltic lava and sills are also found, together with tuffs and volcanic breccia. Though its surface outcrop is present across the White Peak, it is known largely from the subsurface of south Derbyshire, north Staffordshire and north Leicestershire. Its base is generally an unconformity on lower Palaeozoic rocks though rests conformably on Devonian to Carboniferous anhydrites and dolomites in places.

The Rue Hill Dolomite Formation, as seen in Dovedale for example, constitutes the lowermost unit of this group and this is overlain by the Milldale Limestone Formation in the southwest of the White Peak. Elsewhere in the Peak, the Woo Dale Limestone Formation is the lowermost unit seen. A disconformity separates this limestone from a suite of overlying units which include the Kevin, Hopedale, Ecton, Bee Low and Monsal Dale limestone formations. The uppermost unit across much of the White Peak is the Eyam Limestone Formation. Over 14 agglomerate vents have been identified in the Peak District along with 30 individual lavas. Where the proportion of igneous rocks within the Peak Limestone increases to the east, these strata are identified as the Fallgate Volcanic Formation as in the inlier at Ashover.
