= Acanthorhachis =

Acanthorhachis Temporal range: Visean– Westphalian

Scientific classification
- Kingdom: Animalia
- Phylum: Chordata
- Class: Chondrichthyes
- Order: incertae sedis
- Family: †Listracanthidae
- Genus: †Acanthorhachis; Martill, Del Strother, & Gallien, 2013
- Species: †A. spinatus

Binomial name
- †Acanthorhachis spinatus (Bolton, 1896) Martill, Del Strother, & Gallien, 2013

Extinct chondrichthyian genus

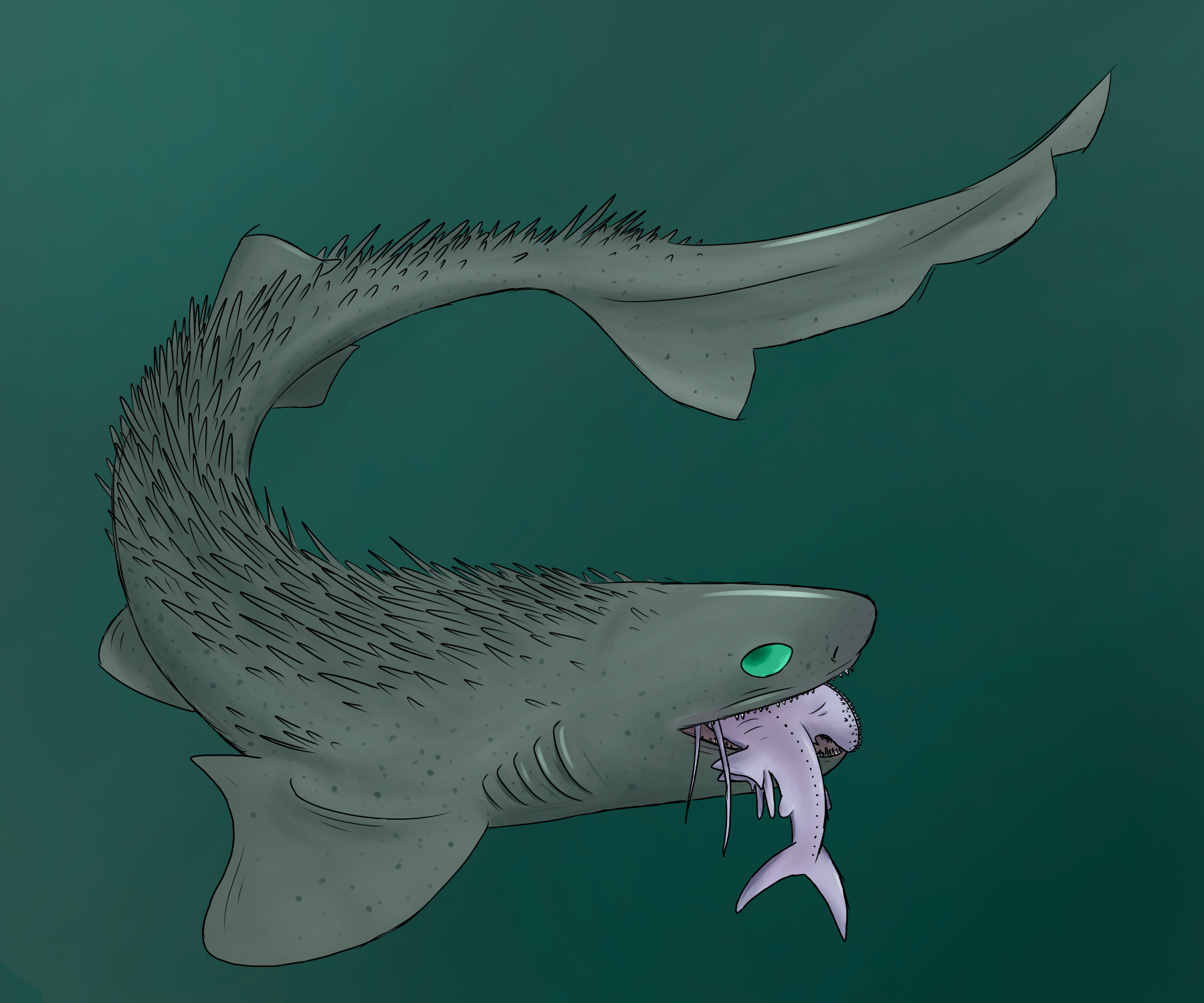
Hypothetical reconstruction of Acanthorhachis spinatus feeding on a Stethacanthid

Acanthorhachis is an enigmatic extinct genus of chondrichthyan from the Carboniferous period. Its name is derived from the Greek word acanthos meaning "spine" and the Greek suffix for spine, -rhachis. This is due to the spine-like dermal denticles and their subsidiary spines, which coated the exterior of the animal. The authors who erected this genus suggested the common name "The Spiny Spined Shark." The type species Listracanthus spinatus was in 1896 named by Herbert Bolton.

It is closely related to Listracanthus. It differs from it in the size, structure, and distribution of dermal spines. It is currently monotypic, containing only the species A. spinatus. This shark is thus far only described from the British Isles. Acanthorhachis was first described from the Westphalian-aged lower coal measures of Yorkshire, England. It occurs rarely in Viséan-aged Eyam Limestone of Derbyshire, England.
