= Gunnellia =

Gunnellia Temporal range: Carboniferous

Scientific classification
- Kingdom: Animalia
- Phylum: Chordata
- Class: Chondrichthyes
- Subclass: Elasmobranchii
- Family: †Anachronistidae
- Genus: †Gunnellia
- Species: †G. tatianae

Binomial name
- †Gunnellia tatianae Ivanov & Duffin, 2024

Extinct genus of cartilaginous fishes

Gunnellia is an extinct genus of anachronistid that lived during the Carboniferous period.

== Distribution ==
Gunnellia tatianae is known from Fossils found in Moscow Oblast, Russia.
