= Cyclodendron =

Cyclodendron Temporal range: Permian

Scientific classification
- Kingdom: Plantae
- Clade: Tracheophytes
- Clade: Lycophytes
- Class: Lycopodiopsida
- Order: †Lepidodendrales
- Family: †Lycopodiopsidaceae
- Genus: †Cyclodendron; Kräusel, 1928

Type species
- †Cyclodendron leslii Seward, 1903

Species
- C. andreisii Herbst & Gutiérrez, 2014; C. brasiliensis Lejal-Nicol & Bernardes-de-Oliveira, 1979; C. golondrinensis Cariglino, Coturel & Gutierrez, 2012; C. leslii Seward, 1903

Extinct genus of spore-bearing plants

Cyclodendron was a genus of lycophytes dating from the Permian. Plants were vascularized with reproduction by spores.

== Taxonomy and distribution ==
The type species, C. leslii, was originally described by Seward in 1903 under the name Bothrodendron leslii and based on specimens collected in Vereeniging, Atherstone Quarry and Port Alfred, South Africa. In 1928, Kräusel would reassign this species to his newly-erected genus Cyclodendron, to which he also assigned specimens from southwest Africa and Uganda. Later authors would recognize more fossils from other Permian Gondwanan localities to belong to this species, including Australia (Reids Dome beds), India and Oman (Gharif Formation).

In Brazil, the fossil of indefinite species of the genus Cyclodendron, was located on outcrop Morro Papaléo in the city of Mariana Pimentel. They are in the geopark Paleorrota in Rio Bonito Formation and date from Sakmarian at Permian.

In 2012, C. golondrinensis was described from specimens collected in the Permian-aged La Golondrina Formation of Santa Cruz Province, Argentina. It is named after the formation.

The species C. andreisii was described in 2014 based on a series of sequentially decorticated stems. The fossil specimens were discovered in the upper Permian Yaguarí Formation of Uruguay.
