= Buena Vista Formation =

Geologic formation in Uruguay

- Stratigraphic range: Late Permian-Early Triassic; ~259.5–247.2 Ma
- Type: Geological formation
- Underlies: Tacuarembó Formation
- Overlies: Yaguarí Formation

Lithology
- Primary: Sandstone, mudstone
- Other: Conglomerate

Location
- Coordinates: 32.3°S 54.1°W
- Approximate paleocoordinates: 40.2°S 15.7°W
- Region: Cerro Largo Department
- Country: Uruguay
- Extent: Norte Basin
- Buena Vista Formation (Uruguay)

The Buena Vista Formation is a Late Permian-Early Triassic geologic formation of the Cerro Largo Department in northeastern Uruguay. The fluvial sandstones and mudstones preserve temnospondyl and archosaur fossils.

== Description ==
The Buena Vista Formation is characterized by reddish fine sandstone interbedded with lenticular clay layers and intraformational conglomerates deposited in a fluvial environment.

== Fossil content ==
The following fossils have been reported from the formation:

- Temnospondyls
  - Arachana nigra
  - Uruyiella liminea
  - Dvinosauria indet.
  - Mastodonsauridae indet.
- Reptiles
  - Pintosaurus magnidentis
  - Archosauromorpha indet.

== See also ==
- List of fossiliferous stratigraphic units in Uruguay
