= Gharif Formation =

Geologic formation in Oman

- Stratigraphic range: Permian
- Type: Geological formation
- Unit of: Haushi Group
- Sub-units: Upper Member; Middle Member; Lower Member
- Underlies: Khuff Formation
- Overlies: Al Khlata Formation
- Thickness: 157 m (518.1 ft)

Location
- Coordinates: 55°31’00”E, 19°17’45”N
- Country: Oman
- Gharif Formation (Oman)

The Gharif Formation is a geologic formation in Oman. It preserves fossils dating back to the Permian period. The Gharif clastic reservoirs are an important hydrocarbon production unit, and the formation is a major producing oil and gas reservoir in Oman.

== Stratigraphy ==
The subsurface Gharif Formation has been informally divided into 3 members (Lower, Middle and Upper) by geologists from Petroleum Development Oman. Though these members may be difficult to distinguish in certain localities due to rapid lateral facies changes, differential incision, salt movement or erosion, multiple studies have shown that these 3 members can be correlated on a regional scale.

=== Lower Gharif Member ===
The lower member is about 65 m (214.5 ft) thick in north and central Oman. It has been split into 3 submembers:

- Lower Gharif submember-1 unconformably overlies the Al Khlata Formation and is made up mostly of cross-bedded quartz sandstone. Locally, crinoid and brachiopod remains can be found. Though its thickness varies across central Oman, it is generally about 25 meter thick and does not exceed 30 meters.
- Lower Gharif submember-2 (or the Maximum Flooding Shale) contains bioturbated lime-mudstones and is under 10 meters thick.
- Lower Gharif submember-3 (also known as the Haushi Limestone) is about 35 meters thick and occurs in much of central and north Oman. It is a cross-bedded oolitic packstone and grainstone, and stromatolitic mudstone.

=== Middle Gharif Member ===
The middle member is about 85 m (280.5 ft) thick in north and Central Oman. It contains the following 3 informal units (from the base up):

- Middle Gharif unit 1 is less than 10 meters thick and represents shoreface, tidal flat, lagoonal and mixed paralic environments.
- Middle Gharif unit 2 is under 40 meters thick. Deposited after the demise of the 'Haushi Sea' in an episodically dry environment, it exhibits interlocking marine and non-marine conditions, representing major progradation and coastal advance.
- Middle Gharif unit 3 (occasionally inappropriately referred to as the Playa Shale) is made up of a red-brown Shale and is over 40 meters thick. Though suggested to represent an extensive intracratonic ephemeral lake system, it has been reinterpreted to be laid down during a long dry period which caused significant pedified palaeosol horizon development.

=== Upper Gharif Member ===
The upper member is about 90 m (295 ft) thick in north and central Oman. Informally, it has been split into the ‘Upper Gharif Sandstone’ and ‘Upper Gharif Red Beds’.

== Fossil content ==
=== Amphibians ===
Amphibians reported from the Gharif Formation
Genus	Species	Locality	Stratigraphic member	Material	Notes	Images
Aistopoda?	Indeterminate	Al Wusta Region.	Middle Gharif.	A vertebra.	Potential aistopod fossil.	
Lepospondyli	Indeterminate	Al Wusta Region.	Middle Gharif.	Tooth plate.	A lepospondyl.	

=== Fish ===
==== Acanthodians ====
Acanthodians reported from the Gharif Formation
Genus	Species	Locality	Stratigraphic member	Material	Notes	Images
Acanthodii	Indeterminate	Al Wusta Region.	Middle Gharif.	Scales.	Undeterminable acanthodian remains.	

==== Bony fish ====
Bony fish reported from the Gharif Formation
Genus	Species	Locality	Stratigraphic member	Material	Notes	Images
Gnathorhiza	G. sp.	Al Wusta Region.	Middle Gharif.	Vomer & pterygoid.	A lungfish.	
Palaeoniscoidei	Indeterminate	Al Wusta Region.	Middle Gharif.	Scales.	Undeterminable palaeoniscoid remains.	

==== Cartilaginous fish ====
Cartilaginous fish reported from the Gharif Formation
Genus	Species	Locality	Stratigraphic member	Material	Notes	Images
Lissodus	L. sp.	Al Wusta Region.	Middle Gharif.	A tooth.	A hybodont.	
Triodus	T. sp.	Al Wusta Region.	Middle Gharif.	Isolated teeth.	A xenacanth.	
Wurdigneria	W. sp.	Al Wusta Region.	Middle Gharif.	Isolated teeth.	A xenacanth.	

=== Invertebrates ===
Invertebrates reported from the Gharif Formation
Genus	Species	Locality	Stratigraphic member	Material	Notes	Images
Conchostraca		Al Wusta Region.	Middle Gharif.		A clam shrimp.	
"Spirorbis"		Al Wusta Region.	Middle Gharif.		A spirorbiform microconchid.	

=== Plants ===
Plants reported from the Gharif Formation
Genus	Species	Locality	Stratigraphic member	Material	Notes	Images
Arberia	A. sp.	Huqf area.		Isolated fertile structure.	A glossopteridale.	
Arberiopsis	A. sp.	Huqf area.		Isolated fertile structure.	A glossopteridale.	
Baieroxylon	B. implexum	Huqf area.		Wood.	A ginkgoale.	
Calamites	C. gigas	Huqf area.		Medullar casts.	A horsetail.	
Calamostachys	C. dumasii	Huqf area.		Medullar casts.	A horsetail.	
Cathaysiopteris	C. whitei	Huqf area.		Leaves.	A gigantopterid.	
Comia	C. sp.	Huqf area.		Leaves.	A probable seed plant.	
Cyclodendron	C. leslii	Huqf area.			A lepidodendrale.	
Dadoxylon (Eristophyton)	D. (E.) callixyloides	Huqf area.		Wood.	A conifer, represents a new species.	
Gigantonoclea	G. lagrelii	Huqf area.		Leaves.	A gigantopterid.	
Gigantonoclea	G. sp.	Huqf area.			A gigantopterid.	
Gigantopteris	G. sp.	Huqf area.		Leaves.	A gigantopterid.	
Glossopteris	G. angustifolia	Huqf area.		Leaves.	A glossopteridale.	
Glossopteris	G. browniana	Huqf area.			A glossopteridale.	
Glossopteris	G. claramarginata	Huqf area.			A glossopteridale.	
Glossopteris	G. damudica	Huqf area.			A glossopteridale.	
Glossopteris	G. occidentalis	Huqf area.			A glossopteridale.	
Glossopteris	G. taeniopteroides	Huqf area.			A glossopteridale.	
Lanceolatus	L. sp.	Huqf area.		Female organs.	A glossopteridale.	
Lepidodendron	L. acutangula	Huqf area.		Stems.	A lepidodendrale.	
Lidgettonia	L. sp.	Huqf area.			A glossopteridale.	
Otovicia (Walchia)	O. (W.) hypnoides	Huqf area.			A conifer.	
Plumsteadia	P. sp.	Huqf area.		Female organs.	A glossopteridale.	
Prototaxoxylon	P. gharifense	Huqf area.		Wood.		
Sigillaria	S. brardii	Huqf area.			A lepidodendrale.	
Sphenophyllum	S. speciosum	Huqf area.		Macrofossils.	A sphenophyllale.	
Sphenophyllum	S. sino-coreanum	Huqf area.		Macrofossils.	A sphenophyllale.	
Tingia	T. sp.	Huqf area.		Leaves.	A noeggerathiale.	
Tingiostachya	T. sp.	Huqf area.		Fertile cones.	A noeggerathiale.	
Trigonomyelon	T. omanense	Huqf area.		Wood.	A probable conifer.	

== See also ==
- List of fossiliferous stratigraphic units
