= Reesodus =

Reesodus Temporal range: Tournaisian–Wordian

Scientific classification
- Kingdom: Animalia
- Phylum: Chordata
- Class: Chondrichthyes
- Order: †Hybodontiformes
- Genus: †Reesodus; Koot, Cuny, Tintori & Twitchett, 2013

Type species
- Reesodus underwoodi Koot, Cuny, Tintori & Twitchett, 2013

Species
- R. pectinatus Lebedev, 1996; R. underwoodi Koot, Cuny, Tintori & Twitchett, 2013; R. wirksworthensis Duffin, 1985

Extinct genus of cartilaginous fishes

Reesodus is an extinct genus of hybodontiform. It lived from the Tournaisian age of the Early Carboniferous to the Wordian age of the Permian, and remains have been found in England, Russia and Oman. The generic name honors Jan Rees, who first realized that the fossils belong to a distinct genus.

== Taxonomy ==
Rees & Underwood (2002) found that Paleozoic material referred to the genus Lissodus should be assigned to two separate genera which they left unnamed. They assigned 'Lissodus' wirksworthensis from southern England, 'Lissodus' pectinatus from western Russia and 'Lissodus' sp. from central Russia to 'Palaeozoic Genus 2'. The genus Reesodus was erected in 2013 as a replacement name for 'Palaeozoic Genus 2', with the newly described Reesodus underwoodi from the Khuff Formation of Oman as the type species. Though the known material is identified as belonging to a hybodontiform, Reesodus cannot be confidently assigned to any family (though it is assumed to be close to Lonchidiidae) as the heterodonty pattern and the possible presence of enlarged lateral teeth cannot be assessed, thus it is listed as Hybodontiformes incertae sedis.

=== Species ===
Currently, the following species have been assigned to the genus Reesodus:

The type species, Reesodus underwoodi, is known from 6 complete teeth collected from the Guadalupian-aged Khuff Formation of Oman. The specific name honors Charlie Underwood, who worked on the taxonomy of Lissodus and recognized the Paleozoic specimens to represent separate genera. Teeth of this species always have a triangular labial peg and a lingual peg, and sometimes two accessory nodes. The crown shoulder has a horizontal rim and acute longitudinal crest. The teeth are small and symmetrical, measuring 0.4–0.5 mm high.

Originally described in 1985 as Lissodus wirksworthensis, Reesodus wirksworthensis is known from fossilized teeth found in the Early Carboniferous-aged Eyam Limestone of Derbyshire, England. Its teeth measure 0.75 mm in height and 2 mm mesiodistally, with a longitudinal ridge on the crown shoulder and a moderate labial peg. The basal root has many foramina and is well-developed, reaching a height of 0.35 mm.

Reesodus pectinatus was originally described in 1996 as Lissodus pectinatus, but has since been recognized to belong in this separate genus. It is known from teeth collected in Tournaisian-Viséan deposits in western Russia.

== Description ==
Reesodus is known from fossil teeth characterized in having a mesio-distally expanded crown with a low profile, as many as 4 lateral cusplets and a very strong crown shoulder. These teeth may be ornamented with varying amounts and density of coarse folds. The labial peg is moderately or well-developed, often accompanied by protuberances near the base of the lateral cusplets and/or a labial root buttress. Compared to those of other hybodonts, the tooth roots of Reesodus are less porous.
