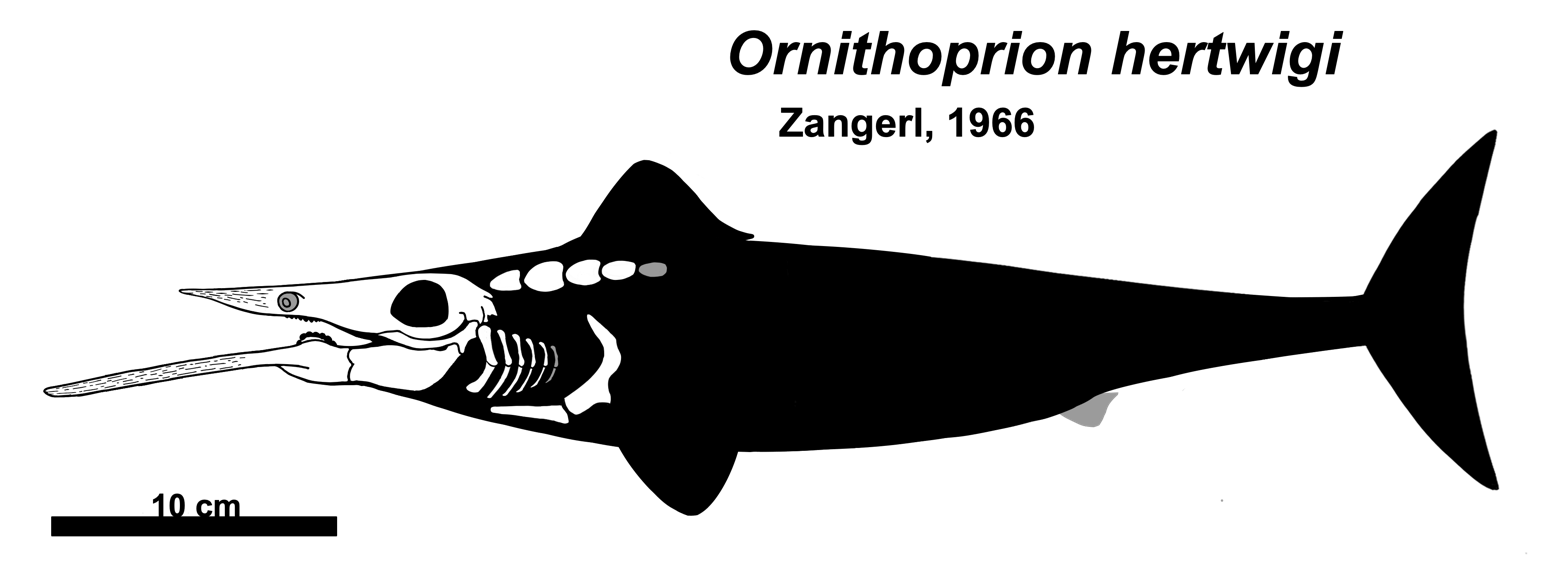
- Skeletal reconstruction of Ornithoprion, with known material represented in white and implied/suggested material represented in gray

Scientific classification
- Kingdom: Animalia
- Phylum: Chordata
- Class: Chondrichthyes
- Subclass: Holocephali
- Order: †Eugeneodontiformes
- Family: †Caseodontidae
- Genus: †Ornithoprion; Zangerl, 1966

Type species
- †Ornithoprion hertwigi Zangerl, 1966

= Ornithoprion =

Ornithoprion Temporal range: Pennsylvanian, Moscovian

Extinct genus of cartilaginous fish

Ornithoprion is an extinct genus of cartilaginous fish. The only known species, O. hertwigi, lived during the Moscovian stage of the Pennsylvanian subperiod, which spanned from 315 to 307 million years ago. Its fossils are preserved in black shales from what became the Midwestern United States. The study of Ornithoprion was performed primarily via x-ray imaging, and at the time of its discovery it represented one of the best known holocephalans of the Paleozoic era. The classification of the genus has been the subject of debate due to its unique anatomy; it is placed in the order Eugeneodontiformes and the family Caseodontidae. Ornithoprion's genus name, which may be translated from Greek as 'bird saw', was inspired by the animal's vaguely bird-like skull and the saw-like appearance of the teeth in the lower jaw, while the specific name honors German zoologist Oscar Hertwig.

Ornithoprion had a unique projection of its lower jaw termed the mandibular rostrum, which was covered by a beak of fused bony scales whose function is unknown. It inhabited shallow, seasonal marine and brackish water environments, alongside a variety of other cartilaginous fishes. The rounded shape of Ornithoprion's teeth suggests that it hunted hard-shelled invertebrates, and bite marks and damage to some of its fossils indicate that it was in turn fed on by other carnivores. Ornithoprion was small relative to other members of its order, with a cranium length of up to 10 cm (3.9 in) and an estimated body length of up to approximately 91 cm (36 in).

== Discovery and naming ==
The genus Ornithoprion and its only species, O. hertwigi, were formally described in 1966 by paleontologist Rainer Zangerl. This description was based largely on seven fossils collected from the Mecca Quarry Shale of Parke County, Indiana, since the 1950s, in rocks which are part of the Linton Formation. A single specimen was also described from the Logan Quarry Shale of the Staunton Formation (alternatively the Tradewater Formation), also in Parke County, (Note: Author Richard Ellis mistakenly said that three Ornithoprion skulls were described from Logan Quarry) which along with the Mecca Quarry material is part of the collection of the Field Museum of Natural History. (Note: The Field Museum was named the Chicago Museum of Natural History at the time of O. hertwigi's description) Another specimen from near Wilmington, Illinois, was also described, although the stratigraphic unit from which it originated is unknown, and it is part of a private collection. The specimens are all preserved in carbonaceous shale, and the preservation mode of the Illinois specimen has been described as pyritic (composed of the mineral pyrite). Specimen FMNH PF-2710 from the Mecca Quarry was designated as the holotype (the defining specimen of the species). Since Ornithoprion was named, additional fossil specimens from the Excello Shale and Carbondale Formation of Indiana, as well as material from Kansas, have been assigned. These specimens are housed in the collections of the American Museum of Natural History and the Natural History Museum, London. (Note: In a 2008 review of eugeneodont material, authors Raoul Mutter and Andrew Neuman list the species Helicoprion nevadensis from the Early Permian of Nevada as "Ornithoprion nevadensis". This assignment has not been acknowledged in subsequent reviews of the genus Helicoprion)

Like many other fish fossils from the Mecca and Logan quarries, study of the holotype and paratypes of Ornithoprion were primarily performed by radiographic imaging. The specimens, which are extremely delicate, were not extracted from the surrounding rock matrix and were instead scanned via stereoscopic X-rays to study the hard parts of the body from within the shale. The Staunton Formation specimen, FMNH PF-2656, was also cut into multiple cross-sections, which allowed for study of the internal anatomy of the scales and teeth. At the time of its discovery, Ornithoprion was one of the few members of its order known from postcranial fossils, alongside the genera Fadenia, Erikodus, and what would later be described as Eugeneodus. (Note: Prior to its description in 1981, Eugeneodus was referred to as "Agassizodus sp.") It also represented one of only a small number of holocephalans from the Paleozoic era in which the endoskeleton was known, and alongside the related Fadenia was unique in preserving the gill arches in detail.

The genus name, Ornithoprion, translates literally from Greek as 'bird saw' and was given in reference to the saw-like row of teeth in the lower jaw and the animal's pointed, beaked skull. The specific name, hertwigi, honors German zoologist Oscar Hertwig.

== Description ==
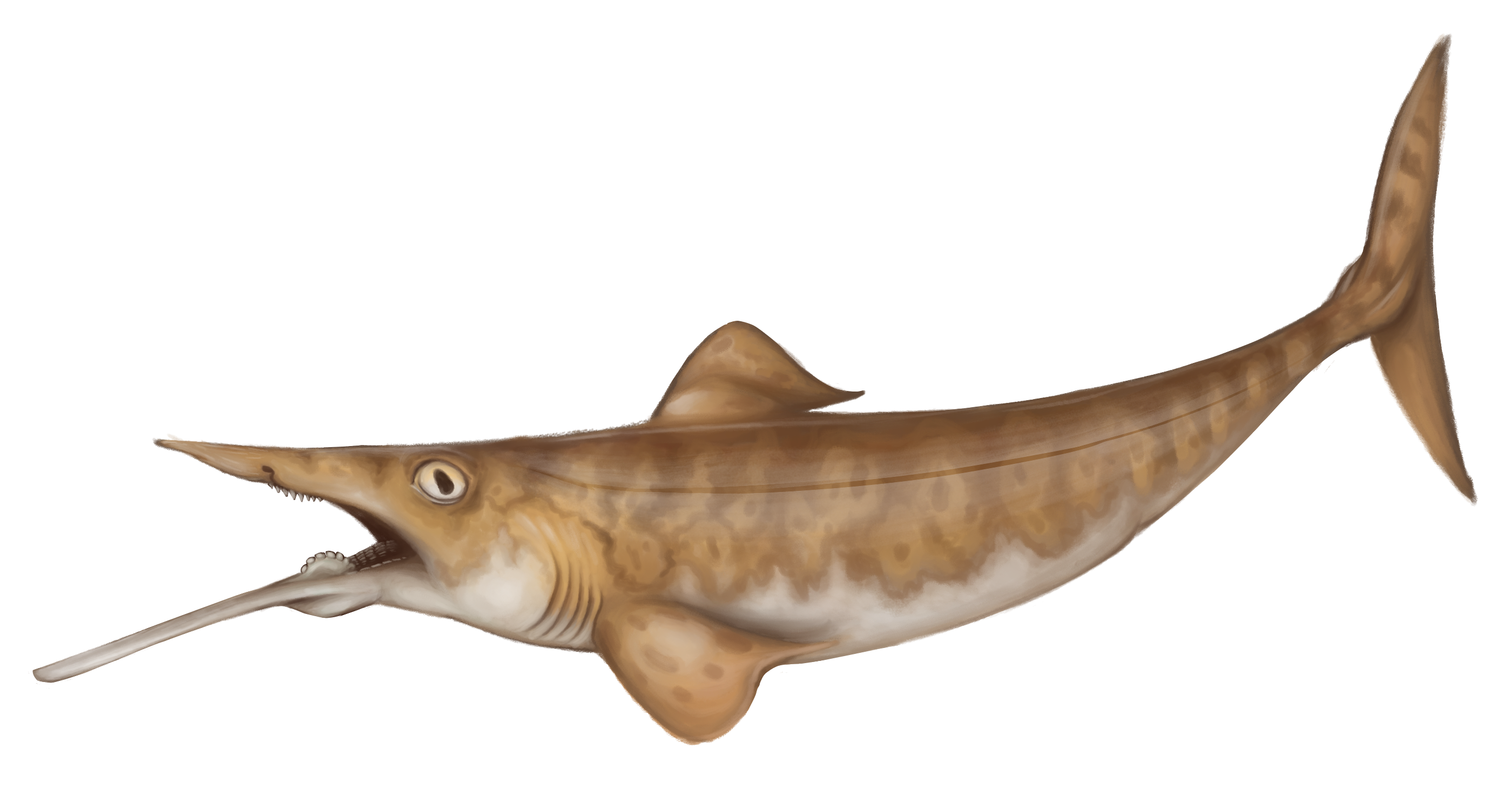
Life reconstruction of Ornithoprion, with body proportions based on close relatives and with a hypothetical striped patterning

Ornithoprion is known from multiple articulated but incomplete skeletons, and none of the described specimens preserve the body past the pectoral girdle. Most of these are preserved on their side, and all, including the holotype, are flattened. Additional postcranial remains such as the tail are known, but these have not been prepared or described in detail. The internal skeleton of Ornithoprion was composed of the tissue cartilage and was reinforced by an outer coating of mineralized tesserae; prismatic structures which overlay the cartilage skeletons of chondrichthyans. Zangerl noted that Ornithoprion was "very small" in his description of the taxon, and in a 2003 book Richard Ellis suggested Ornithoprion had a total length of 90 cm (3 ft) based on an assumed skull length of less than 15 cm (6 in).

=== Skull ===
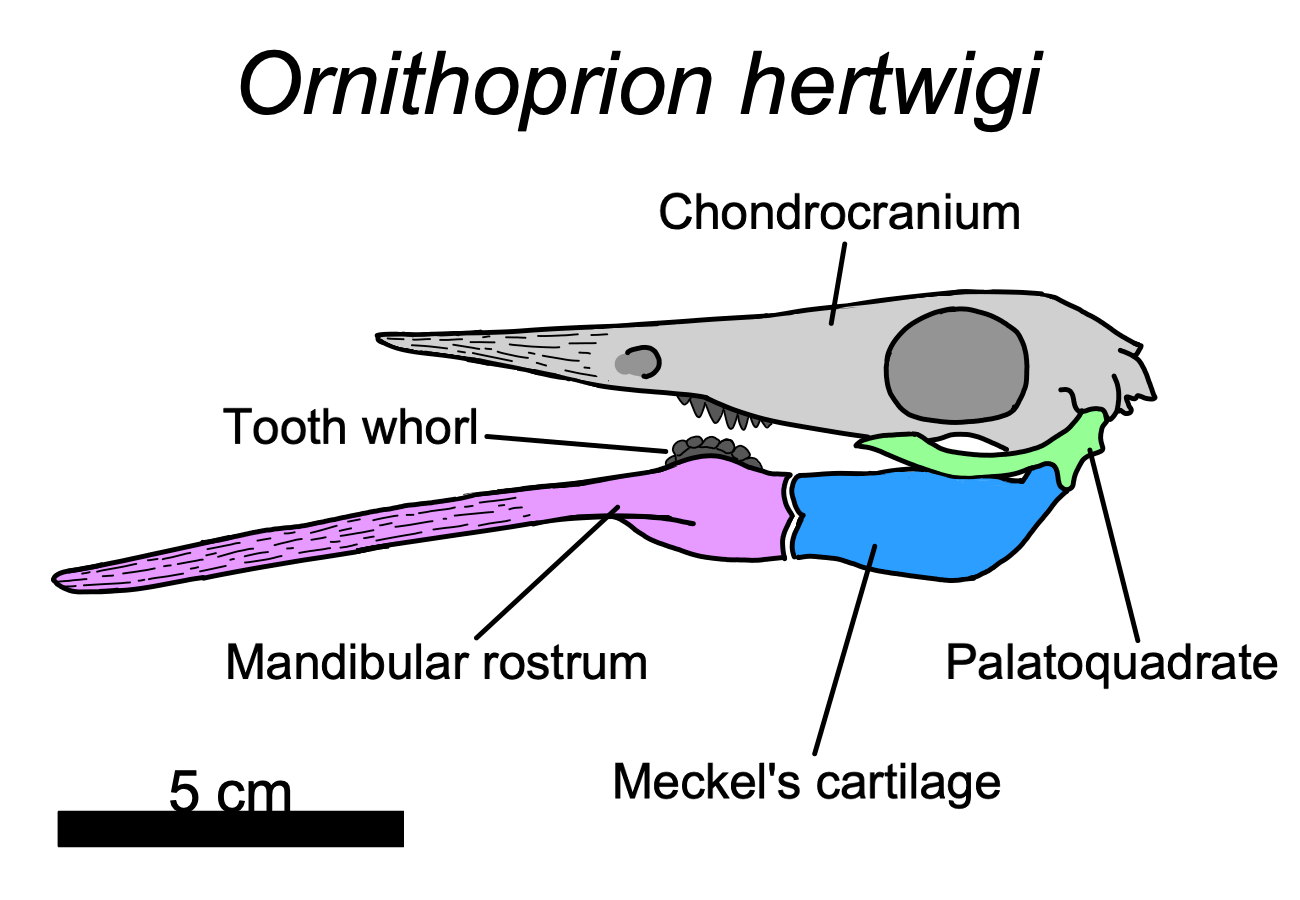
Restored skull of Ornithoprion scaled to the largest figured specimen. Thin lines along the rostra represent rods of armor.

The lower jaw of Ornithoprion was roughly 1.3 times the length of the rest of the skull, and had a jointed, forward-facing projection termed the mandibular rostrum. While similar rostra are known in several related fish, the structure was significantly longer in Ornithoprion, and both the rostrum and a correlating section of the snout were uniquely armored by rods of bone embedded in the skin. In life, the mandibular rostrum was likely to have been cylindrical in cross section, with the exception of the rear portion which had a small bulging projection underlying a set of teeth. There is no indication that the mandibular rostrum contained sensory organs. The rostrum articulated with the Meckel's cartilages (equivalent to the mandible) at a flexible joint, and a flattened keel of cartilage protruded from the bottom of the rostrum near this point of contact. The Meckel's cartilages themselves consisted of a pair of broad, flattened, nearly immobile cartilages, which articulated with the palatoquadrates (equivalent to the upper jaws). Because of the shape of the Meckel's cartilages, the mouth was likely incapable of closing.

The palatoquadrates were greatly reduced, and potentially fused partially with the cranium. This differs greatly from related genera such as Helicoprion, in which the palatoquadrates were large and specialized, and potentially Fadenia, which may have had them entirely fused to the cranium or completely lost. The condition in Ornithoprion most closely resembled some other related genera such as Caseodus and Eugeneodus, although the degree of reduction is much greater in Ornithoprion. The palatoquadrate had two points of articulation with the cranium; one with a process which may have been the postorbital process at the back of the skull, and one beneath the eye socket.

The chondrocranium (or neurocranium) of Ornithoprion had a long, pointed snout and large, high-set eye sockets, which Zangerl compared to a bird's skull. An indentation set far forward on the snout is reported by Zangerl to have likely held the nasal capsule (skeletal support for the nostrils), although this region of the skull is poorly known. The brain was small and positioned along the lower surface of the neurocranium, but little else is known about the cranial nervous system. Processes on the back of the cranium that Zangerl speculated to be a fused hyoid arch are also known,, although the interpretation of these structures as part of a hyoid arch has subsequently been questioned by paleontologist Svend Erik Bendix-Almgreen. The largest Ornithoprion cranium measures approximately 10 cm (3.9 in) in length.

=== Teeth ===
The lower dentition of Ornithoprion consisted of multiple tooth crowns extending from a connected base (or root) along the midline of the lower jaw; an arrangement which resembled a saw and is referred to as a tooth whorl. Additional rows of tightly stacked, flattened teeth were also present, which were likely positioned along the lateral (side) surfaces of the jaws. The tooth whorl possessed up to seven broad, rounded, bulbous tooth crowns and was positioned near the point of contact between the Meckel's cartilages and the mandibular rostrum. The tooth crowns of the whorl varied in size, with the smallest teeth being situated at the front and the largest at the back. The flattened teeth elsewhere in the lower jaws were rod-like and had an uneven surface texture. They formed a brick-like arrangement termed a "tooth pavement" similar to that of many other Paleozoic cartilaginous fish.

Additional rows of pavement-forming teeth and larger, pointed V-shaped teeth formed the upper dentition of Ornithoprion. Zangerl, in both his initial description of the taxon and in later works, suggested that the upper teeth were associated directly with the underside of the cranium. Later works by Bendix-Almgreen and paleontologist Roger S. Miles have alternatively suggested that Ornithoprion's upper teeth instead attached to a previously unrecognized portion of the palatoquadrates that was fused to the cranium. The V-shaped teeth are thought to have formed a row along the midline of either the cranium or fused palatoquadrates.

Based on thin sectioning, the tooth crowns of Ornithoprion are thought to have been composed primarily of trabecular dentin (a spongy form of dentin present in holocephalan fishes) with an outer coating of orthodentin. There is no indication of enameloid (also called vitrodentin), but a thin layer may have been present in life.

=== Postcranial skeleton ===
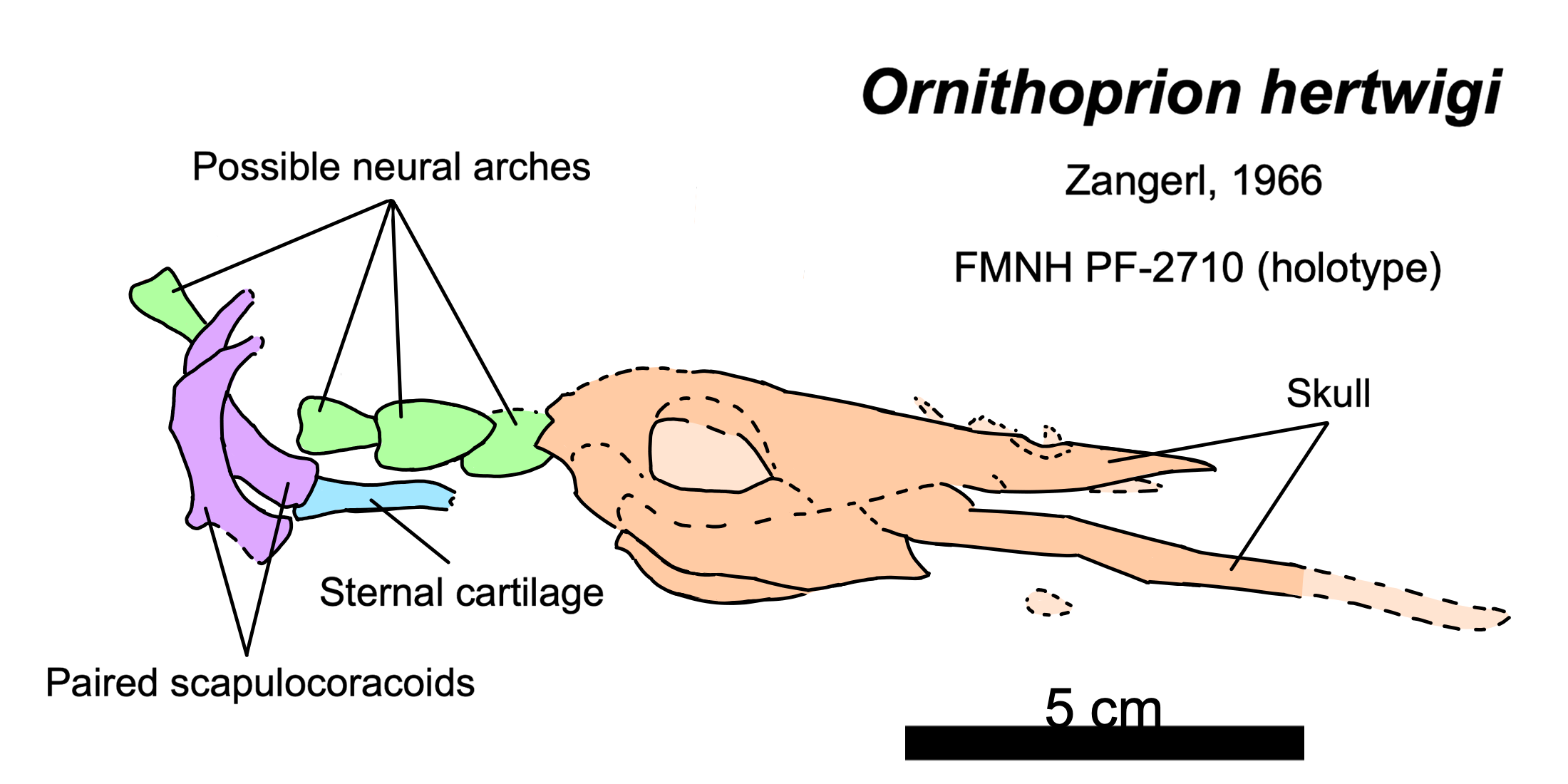
Illustrated diagram of the holotype, with damaged or poorly defined anatomy represented by dashed lines. Disarticulated teeth and denticles have been omitted for clarity.

Either five or six pairs of gill arches were present in Ornithoprion, and positioned behind the arches were the scapulocoracoids (pectoral girdles). The paired left and right scapulocoracoids were unfused and had forward-angled scapular portions, as well as an unpaired cartilaginous structure which has been tentatively identified as sternal cartilage running beneath their coracoidal portions. A similar intercoracoidal cartilage has also been identified in living broadnose sevengill sharks, as well as the extinct iniopterygians and the chimaeriform Ischyodus. The function of this structure in Ornithoprion is unknown, and it may have been homologous with similar, albeit paired cartilage structures known in other eugeneodonts. While the pectoral fins of Ornithoprion are not known, Bendix-Almgreen suggested that they were likely anatomically unique based on the shape of the animal's pectoral girdle. There is no indication that the fins supported defensive fin spines.

The vertebral centra of Ornithoprion are not preserved and were uncalcified in life, although a series of cartilaginous structures are present along the path of the vertebral column. Zangerl suggested that these elements, which he described as large and leaf-shaped, represented the neural arches of the animal's vertebrae, and he further proposed that their shape may have been an adaptation associated with the unique morphology of the animal's skull. The spinal cord of Ornithoprion was sheathed by a flexible notochord.

=== Dermal denticles ===
The known portion of Ornithoprion's body was completely covered in tiny, tooth-like dermal denticles with rounded crowns. These possessed a pulp cavity, were predominantly made up of orthodentin, and grew from proportionally large, flattened bases. Many of these denticles formed fused, compound structures termed polyodontode scales, which shared a single mushroom-shaped base with upwards of seven crowns emerging from it. Similar polyodontode scales occurred in the related Sarcoprion, and potentially also in Helicoprion. However, the bases of the denticles in Ornithoprion may have uniquely been composed of bone, rather than a form of dentin like in other cartilaginous fish. Extremely small denticles were also present in the mouth and throat of Ornithoprion, which also had crowns composed of orthodentin and bases of bone.

In his 1966 description, Zangerl speculates that the reinforcing bony rods present on the snout and mandibular rostrum were formed by the compounding and fusion of polyodontode scales. He likens this phenomenon to that proposed by Oscar Hertwig as an explanation for the origin of vertebrate dermal armor, although Zangerl acknowledges that this adaptation evolved independently in Ornithoprion.

== Classification ==
Though sometimes referred to as a shark, Ornithoprion is only a distant relative of living sharks (Selachii). When first described, the genus was classified in the family Edestidae, which itself was traditionally considered a member of the order (sometimes class) Bradyodonti or the equivalent subclass Holocephali. In his description of the genus, however, Zangerl classified it and other edestids as elasmobranchs. In the 1971 edition of Paleozoic Fishes, Roger S. Miles considered the genus to be of uncertain position within Chondrichthyes, and only tentatively placed it within Holocephali. He suggested that Ornithoprion's similarities with edestids may be the result of convergent evolution (meaning they developed independently) because of differences in the anatomy of the gills, the tooth histology, and the palatoquadrates. In several works Bendix-Almgreen similarly expressed belief that the features used to unite the edestids may be convergent, and that the family was likely polyphyletic (not a natural group). His conclusions were supported primarily by the apparent presence or absence of enameloid between different edestid taxa, and differences in the features of their skulls. He considered Ornithoprion to be possibly related only to several genera traditionally classified as edestids from the Late Permian of Greenland, although only very distantly. In two 1968 works, both Bendix-Almgreen and paleontologist Colin Patterson considered the features of Ornithoprion inconsistent with a member of Holocephali. In contrast, paleontologist Richard Lund asserted in a 1977 paper that edestids (including Ornithoprion) were indeed primitive relatives of holocephalans, and were part of a larger group he termed Paraselachii.

- Eugeneodontida (=Eugeneodontiformes)
  - Caseodontoidea
    - Caseodontidae
      - - - Fadenia
          - Erikodus
        - Ornithoprion
      - - Caseodus
        - Romerodus
    - Eugeneodontidae
  - Edestoidea

Cladogram modified from figure 102 of Zangerl (1981)

In a 1981 book, Zangerl considered Ornithoprion a member of the new family Caseodontidae, as part of the larger superfamily Caseodontoidea and the newly established order Eugeneodontiformes, (Note: Originally spelled Eugeneodontida, and equivalent to the family Edestidae as used in earlier works) in light of the new taxa and characteristics that had been observed since the genus' description. Ornithoprion's classification within the Caseodontidae is based on the bulbous, rounded nature of its tooth crowns and the reduction of its palatoquadrates, features which are also found in genera such as Caseodus and Erikodus. In this book, Zangerl again classified the eugeneodonts as members of Elasmobranchii, rather than Holocephali or Bradyodonti. The order and family-level classification established by Zangerl remain in use, although his suggestion that eugeneodonts are elasmobranchs has been refuted by subsequent papers, which find Eugeneodontiformes to be a monophyletic (natural) group in the subclass Holocephali. (Note: A 2009 phylogenetic analysis by Richard Lund and Eileen Grogan recovered Ornithoprion as an early-diverging elasmobranch, but the authors attribute this result to the limited data available for the taxon) The only living members of Holocephali are three families in the order Chimaeriformes, which together are commonly called the chimaeras. Despite the group's relation, the chimaeras are highly specialized fish that do not closely resemble the eugeneodonts, which instead developed a lifestyle and appearance much closer to sharks.

== Paleoecology and paleobiology ==
=== Paleoenvironment ===
The Mecca Quarry, Logan Quarry, and Excello shales have been dated to the Moscovian stage of the Pennsylvanian subperiod, (Note: Zangerl used the Westphalian European regional stage to refer to the Mecca and Logan Quarry remains, and identified the Illinois specimen as being from the Desmoinesian North American regional stage. Both of these are contemporaneous with the Moscovian) which spanned from 315 to 307 million years ago and which is part of the longer Carboniferous period. The localities were deposited in the North American Midcontinent Sea, a large inland sea which covered much of what is now North America. The localities that preserve Ornithoprion fossils represented marine or brackish water environments along the margin of the sea, which were inhabited by a diverse assemblage of species. In a 1963 paper, Zangerl and fellow researcher Eugene S. Richardson Jr. proposed that the Mecca and Logan Quarry sites were extremely shallow water habitats, likely less than a meter (3.3 ft) deep, with isolated deeper areas. The presence of peat and coal indicates that the deposits overlaid drowned forests, and are the result of a transgression of a marine environment over a terrestrial one (known as a cyclothem). The rich, black shale which encases the fossils indicates large amounts of decaying organic matter, likely from floating algal mats, was present, which led to anoxic (without oxygen) conditions on the seabed and formed organic mud. Zangerl and Richardson suggested that there is evidence of the water levels lowering significantly during periodic dry seasons, often isolating fishes into small ponds termed "fish traps". They also hypothesized that these ponds were extremely overcrowded and had an overabundance of predators, and that hunting and killing by predatory fish resulted in the mass death assemblages preserved at the sites. The Logan and Mecca shale environments likely only existed for a brief period, with overlying invertebrate communities and limestone deposits indicating that deeper water eventually flooded the region and created a more stable habitat. Some subsequent authors have suggested that these shales were instead formed in deep-water environments with anoxic mud bottoms, similar to the conditions seen in some other fossiliferous midwestern shales, although other authors have treated the conditions that formed the Mecca and Logan sites as distinct from those that formed deep-sea shales and continued to accept a shallow water environment. The Excello Shale had an equivalent depositional environment to the Mecca and Logan Quarry shales.

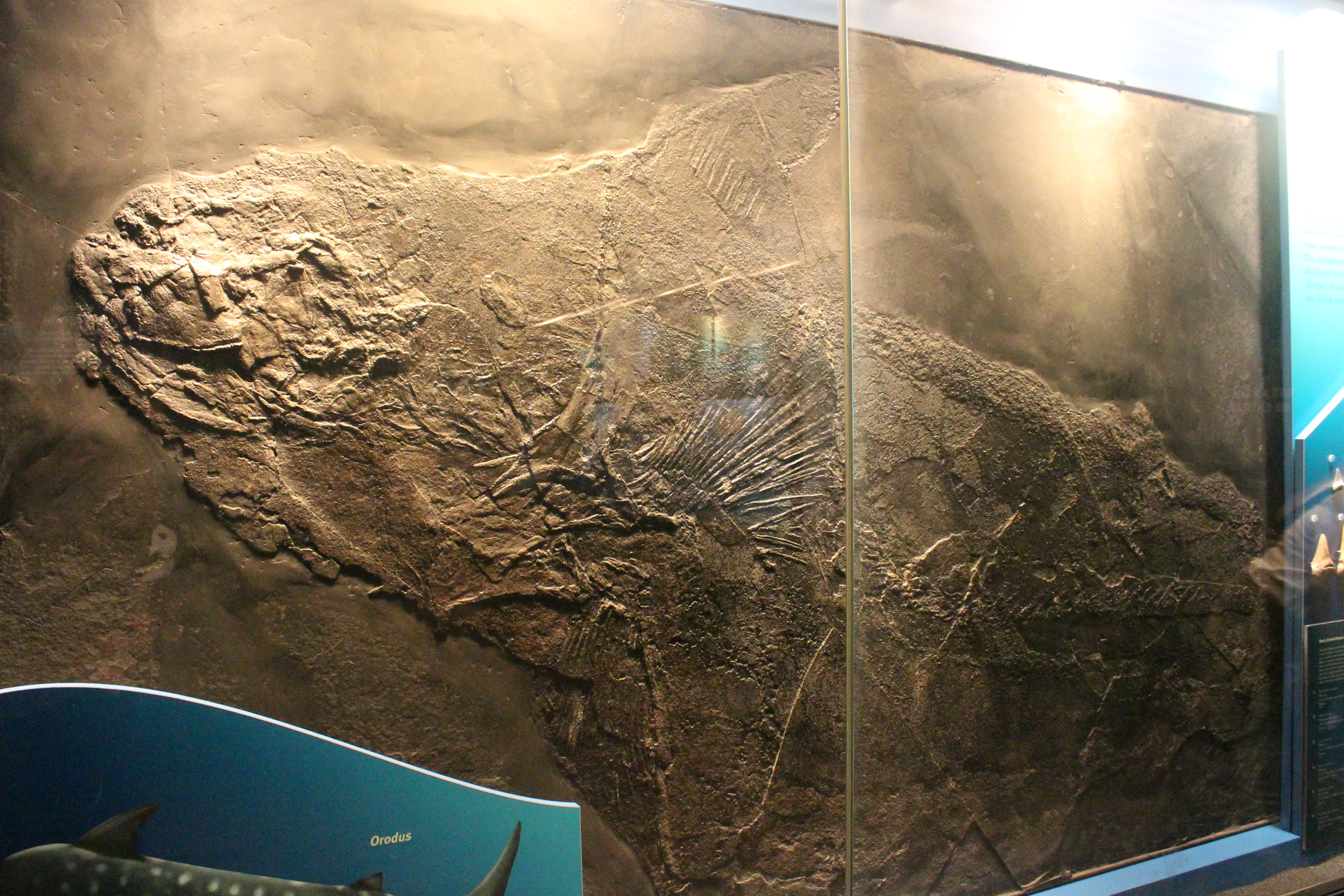
The holotype of Orodus greggi, discovered in Logan Quarry, on display at the Field Museum of Natural History

Slabs of shale containing Ornithoprion fossils sometimes also preserve the remains of other animals, although not directly associated with the Ornithoprion remains. These include isolated spines and denticles from acanthodians, Listracanthus, and Petrodus. The Mecca fauna, which consists of animals from the Mecca and Logan Quarry sites, also preserves an assemblage of conodonts, palaeoniscoids, brachiopods, orthocones, larger predatory chondrichthyans such as Edestus, Orodus, Cobelodus, Symmorium, and Stethacanthus, and several members of the order Iniopterygiformes. The Logan Quarry was inhabited by, in addition to chondrichthyans and palaeoniscoids, an unnamed chondrost-like actinopterygian (ray-finned fish) with an elongated rostrum somewhat similar to that of Ornithoprion. Invertebrates such as brachiopods and ammonoids are known from the Excello Shale, as are many fish genera that are also part of the Mecca fauna. Later work by Rainer Zangerl has suggested that many chondrichthyans of the Mecca fauna, namely the iniopterygians, eugeneodonts and cladodonts, were actually pelagic fishes. He suggested they were vagrants that had migrated into shallower waters and became trapped, rather than being native to these habitats.

=== Predators and scavengers ===
Some specimens of O. hertwigi show damage which Zangerl interpreted as feeding traces left by predators or scavengers. Portions of the skeletons are broken, maimed or missing, and it was suggested that the unpreserved rear halves of the animals may have been severed by predators. The skulls of several Ornithoprion specimens also display small crushed or missing chunks, which Zangerl said likely resulted from other fishes biting them and fracturing the cartilage.Almost all other fish skeletons from the Logan Quarry also show similar feeding traces, or are preserved within fossilized regurgitates or coprolites (feces).

=== Diet and feeding ===
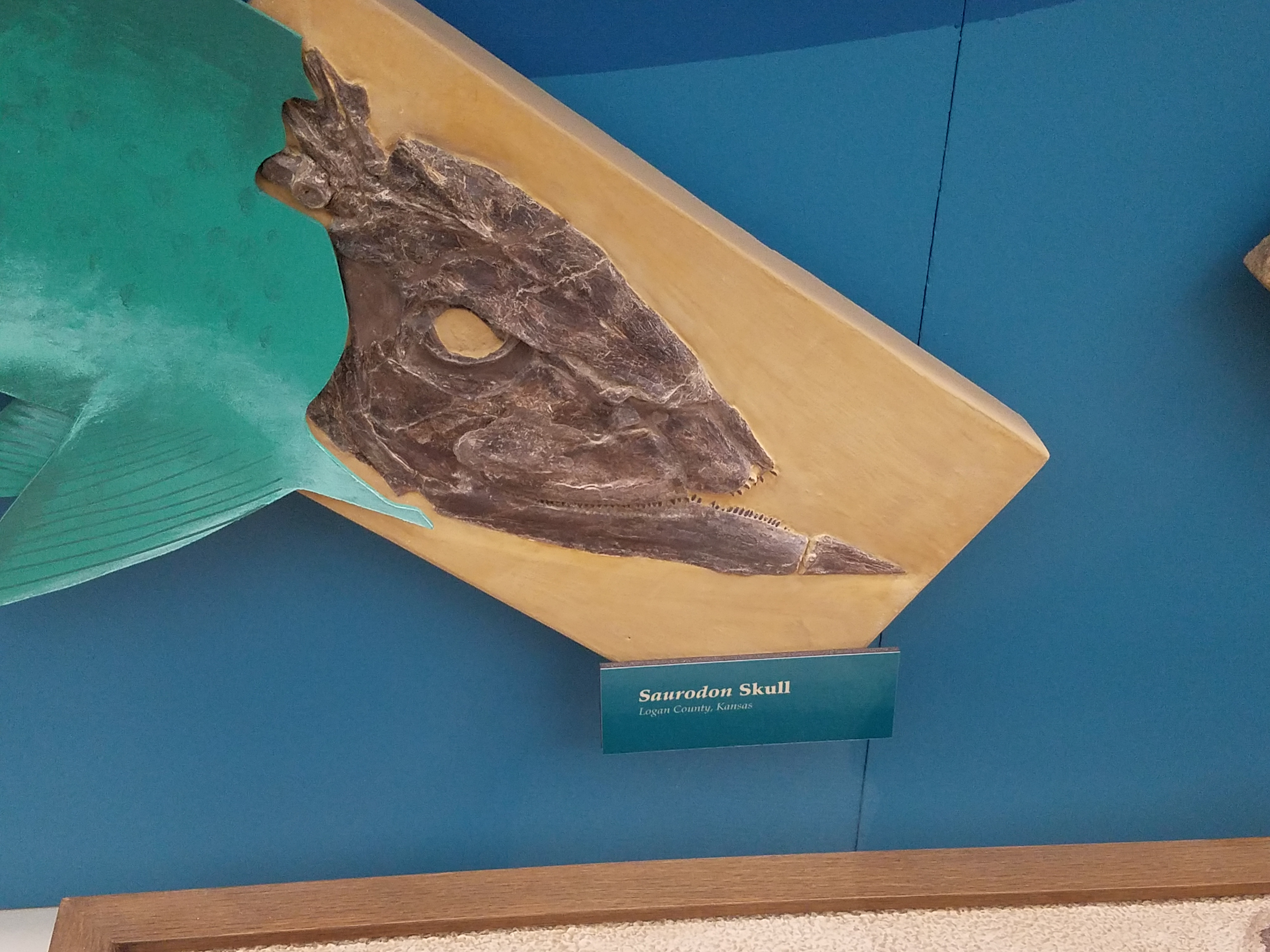
The skull of the Cretaceous bony fish Saurodon, which Rainer Zangerl considered a close morphological analogue for the rostrum of Ornithoprion

Similar to many of its close relatives, Ornithoprion is believed to have been durophagous, with a diet that consisted of shelled invertebrates. The rounded, bulbous crowns of the tooth whorl were likely adaptations for feeding on shelled prey, which would have been crushed between the upper and lower midline tooth rows. The mandibular rostrum is believed to have been utilized in feeding, although the exact mechanism is uncertain. In 1966, Zangerl hypothesized that the structure may have been used to disturb or probe sediment while hunting for prey living on or in the seabed, and potentially to dislodge prey from the bottom. He notes that this possible feeding mode is entirely speculative, although later works agree with the conclusion that the rostra of caseodonts could have been used to probe sediment or dislodge benthic invertebrates such as brachiopods. Some features of Ornithoprion's skull, such as the armor and articulation of the jaws, were suggested by Zangerl to be shock-absorbing adaptations, although he considered it unlikely that the rostrum was a weapon. The mandibular rostrum of Ornithoprion was considered most similar to those of the unrelated extinct bony fish Saurodon and Saurocephalus, in which the function is also unknown.

== See also ==
- Alienacanthus, an unrelated arthrodire with a similarly elongated mandibular rostrum
- List of prehistoric cartilaginous fish genera
