= Iniopterygiformes =

Iniopterygiformes Temporal range: Carboniferous
- Life restoration of Iniopteryx

Scientific classification
- Kingdom: Animalia
- Phylum: Chordata
- Class: Chondrichthyes
- Subclass: Holocephali
- Order: †Iniopterygiformes; Zangerl & Case, 1973

Families
- Sibyrhinchidae; Iniopterygidae

Extinct order of cartilaginous fish

Iniopterygiformes (Originally spelled Iniopterygia and sometimes informally abbreviated as "iniops") is an extinct order of cartilaginous fish known only from the Carboniferous period of the United States. Iniopterygians are characterized by large, superficially wing-like pectoral fins positioned upwards behind the head, from which the name of the group (translated as "nape fin") is derived. Iniopterygians are also noted to possess proportionally large skulls and eyes, armor plates composed of dentin, and "tooth-whorls" of fused teeth. Their elongated pectoral fins bore large, denticle-covered spines, and they are thought to have used them to swim using a "flying" motion. The iniopterygians were comparatively small chondrichthyans, with the largest species reaching only 50 cm (20 in) in length.

3D scan of the skull and pectoral region of the sibyrinchid Iniopera richardsoni

The group is regarded as a relative of modern chimaeras, and is placed in the subclass Holocephali. Two families of iniopterygians are recognized; the Sibyrhynchidae and the Iniopterygidae, with the former containing the genera Sibyrhynchus, Iniopera, and Inioxyele and the latter housing all other named genera. The classification of the iniopterygians, both with each other and with other groups of holocephalan, has been considered problematic.

== Genera ==
Family Iniopterygidae:

- Iniopteryx
  - Iniopteryx rushlaui Zangerl & Case, 1973
  - Iniopteryx tedwhitei Zangerl & Case, 1973
- Promexyele
  - Promexyele peyeri Zangerl & Case, 1973
  - Promexyele bairdi Zangerl & Case, 1973
- Cervifurca
  - Cervifurca nasuta Zangerl, 1981
- Rainerichthys
  - Rainerichthys zangerli Grogan & Lund, 2009
- Papilionichthys
  - Papilionichthys stahlae Grogan & Lund, 2009

Family Sibyrhynchidae:

- Sibyrhynchus
  - Sibyrhynchus denisoni Zangerl & Case, 1973
- Iniopera
  - Iniopera richardsoni Zangerl & Case, 1973
- Inioxyele
  - Inioxyele whitei Zangerl & Case, 1973
