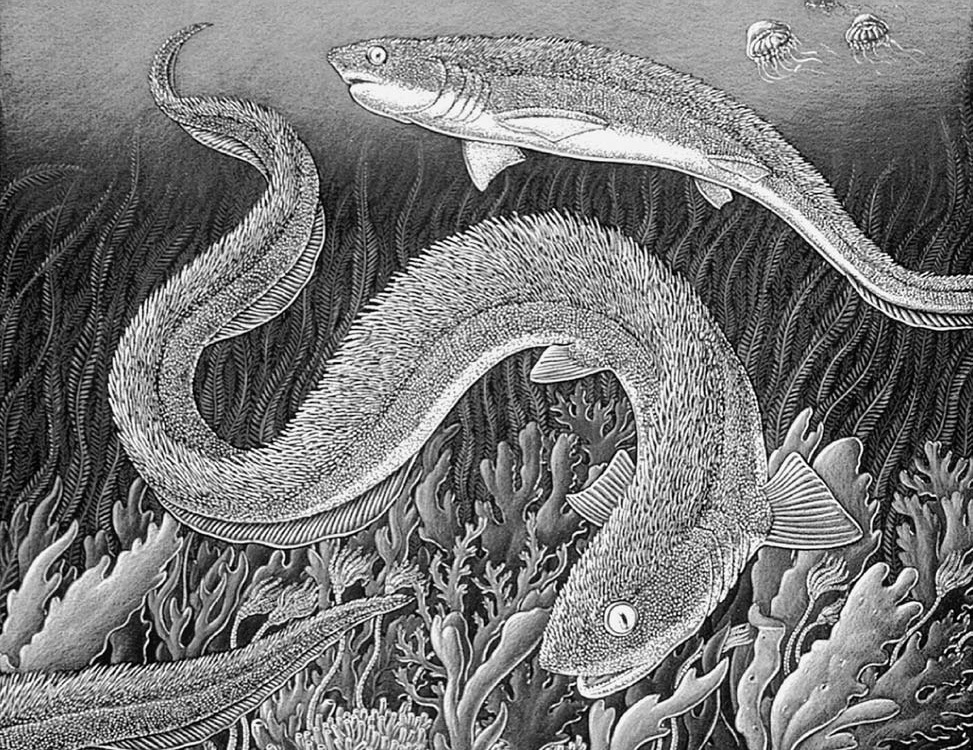
- Artist's rendering of Chondrichthyan Listracanthus

Scientific classification
- Kingdom: Animalia
- Phylum: Chordata
- Class: Chondrichthyes
- Order: incertae sedis
- Family: †Listracanthidae

Genera
- Listracanthus; Acanthorhachis

= Listracanthidae =

Listracanthidae Temporal range: Early Carboniferous– Early Triassic

Extinct family of cartilaginous fish

Listracanthidae is a proposed family of extinct cartilaginous fish. It currently includes the genera Listracanthus and Acanthorhachis. This clade is likely included within Elasmobranchii, but its placement within it is uncertain. Both genera are known from their distinctive spiny dermal dentictles which coat the exterior of their long, slender bodies. They are known from the Viséan to the Early Triassic, mainly from what is now the northern hemisphere. However, there is a possible occurrence in Australia.
