= Hunter Island penguin =

Hunter Island penguin Temporal range: Holocene

Scientific classification
- Kingdom: Animalia
- Phylum: Chordata
- Class: Aves
- Order: Sphenisciformes
- Family: Spheniscidae
- Genus: †Tasidyptes; Van Tets & O'Connor, 1983

Type species
- Tasidyptes hunteri van Tets & O'Connor, 1983

Extinct species of bird

The Hunter Island penguin is the former common name given to a number of subfossil penguin remains found in a Holocene Aboriginal midden at Stockyard Site on Hunter Island, in Bass Strait 5 km (3.1 mi) off the western end of the north coast of Tasmania, Australia. The remains were estimated by radiocarbon dating to be about 760 ± 70 years old and were used as basis to describe a new genus and species, Tasidyptes hunteri.

The validity of the taxon was questioned because of the fragmentary nature of the fossils, the lack of distinguishability of some of them from the genus Eudyptes, and their origin in different stratigraphic layers of the midden. Subsequent DNA testing showed that the bones belonged to three different penguin species, all of them extant: the Fiordland crested penguin, Snares crested penguin, and fairy penguin. As a result, Tasidyptes hunteri is an invalid name.

== See also ==
- Chatham Islands penguin
- Waitaha penguin
