= Cooleyella =

Cooleyella Temporal range: Carboniferous–Permian

Scientific classification
- Kingdom: Animalia
- Phylum: Chordata
- Class: Chondrichthyes
- Clade: Euselachii
- Subclass: Elasmobranchii
- Family: †Anachronistidae
- Genus: †Cooleyella; Gunnell, 1933

Type species
- Cooleyella peculiaris Gunnell 1933

Species
- C. spatulata Gunnell, 1933; C. peculiaris Gunnell, 1933; C. quinqueloba Gunnell, 1933; C. quadrilobata Gunnell, 1933; C. simplex Gunnell, 1933; C. cuspidata Gunnell, 1933; C. fordi Duffin & Ward, 1983; C. amazonensis Duffin et al., 1996; C. duffini Ivanov, 2015

Synonyms
- Anachronistes Duffin & Ward, 1983

Extinct genus of cartilaginous fishes

Cooleyella is an extinct genus of cartilaginous fish which lived from the Carboniferous to the Permian of the United States, Russia, UK and Oman. Several species have been described. It is placed in the family Anachronistidae.

== Taxonomy ==
The genus Cooleyella was erected in 1933 by Frank H. Gunnell, who described and named six species (C. spatulata, C. peculiaris, C. quinqueloba, C. quadrilobata, C. simplex and C. cuspidata) within the same paper. The genus name honors Miss Maude Cooley. These species were all established based on fossils from Carboniferous deposits in Missouri and Kansas. Gunnell assigned the genus to the order Selachii, but did not place it within any family.

In 1983, Duffin and Ward described the genus Anachronistes and established A. fordi as the type species based on teeth collected from Viséan-aged deposits of the Eyam Limestone in Derbyshire, England and Esclusham Mountain, Wales. The family Anachronistidae was also erected with Anachronistes as its sole member, and placed in the clade Neoselachii. The genus name is derived from the Greek anachronismos (meaning 'out of time'), referring to its early stratigraphic position in relation to other known neoselachians at the time.

Later in 1996, Duffin (along with two other authors) would describe the species Cooleyella amazonensis and assign the genus Cooleyella to the family Anachronistidae, pointing out that he was unaware of Cooleyella when he erected Anachronistes and Anachronistidae. Because the remains of the two are identical at a generic level, Anachronistes was declared a junior synonym of Cooleyella, and Anachronistes fordi was renamed Cooleyella fordi.
