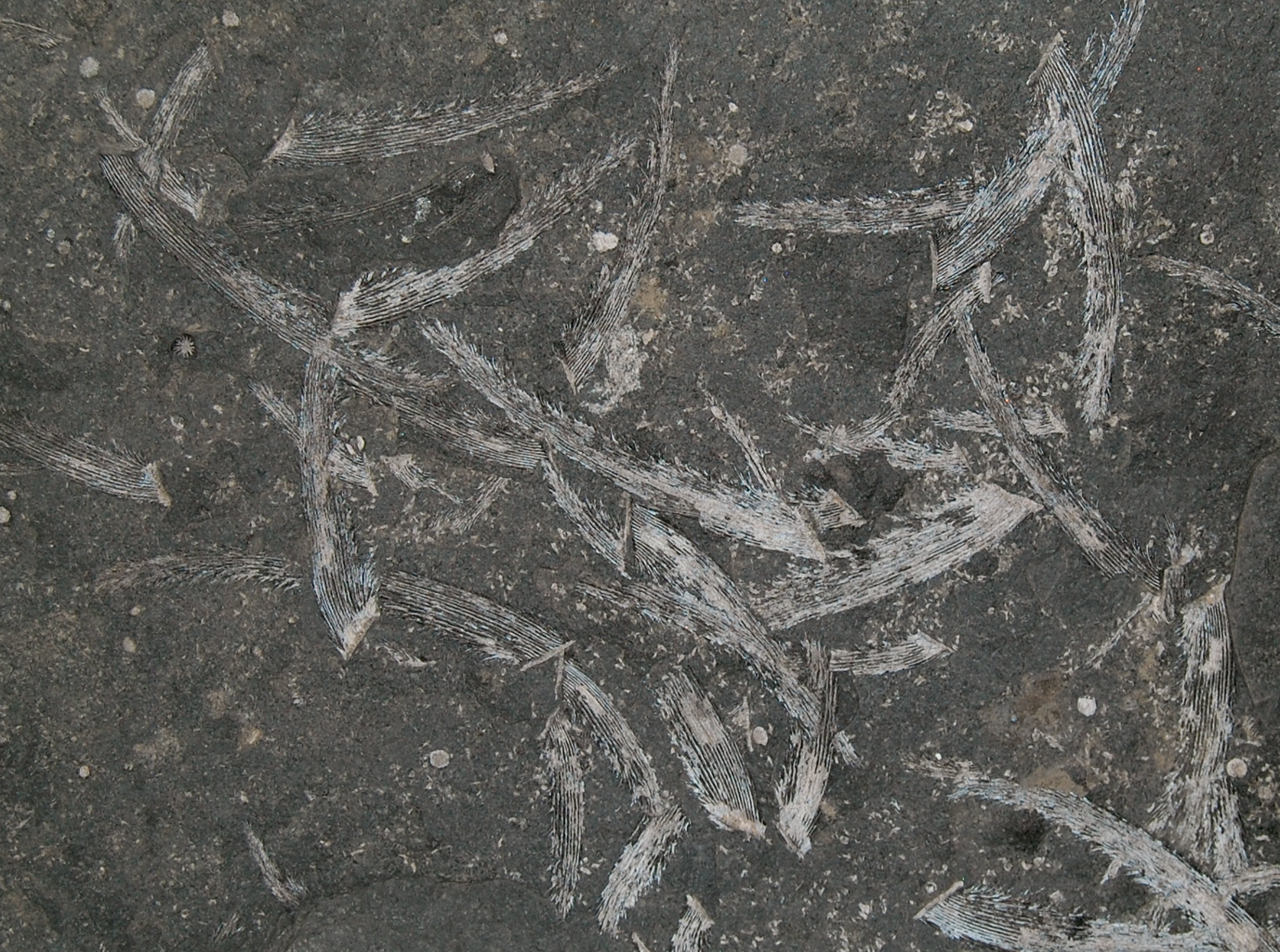
- Cluster of Listracanthus denticles on display at the Milan Natural History Museum
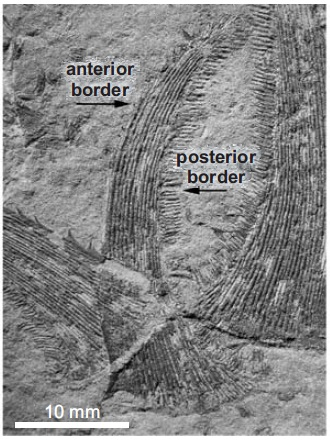
- Denticles of the holotype specimen of L. pectenatus

Scientific classification
- Domain: Eukaryota
- Kingdom: Animalia
- Phylum: Chordata
- Class: Chondrichthyes
- Order: incertae sedis
- Family: †Listracanthidae
- Genus: †Listracanthus; Newberry & Worthen, 1870

Species
- L. beyrichi von Koenen, 1879; L. eliasi Hibbard, 1938; L. hildrethi Newberry, 1875; L. hystrix Newberry & Worthen, 1870 (type); L. pectenatus Mutter & Neuman, 2006; L. wardi Woodward, 1891; L. woltersi Schmidt, 1949

= Listracanthus =

Listracanthus Temporal range: Late Carboniferous to Early Triassic 326.4–251 Ma

Extinct genus of cartilaginous fishes

Listracanthus is a genus of extinct chondrichthyan with uncertain affinities. Species of Listracanthus are known primarily from their tremendous, feather-like denticles, which range up to four inches in length. The denticles had a large main spine, from which secondary spines emanate from the sides, like the barbs of a feather or a comb. Listracanthus first appeared in late Carboniferous strata in North America, and eventually disappear from the fossil record some time during the Early Triassic.

The appearance of these sharks are largely unknown. However, author and illustrator Ray Troll recounts an anecdote in his book, Sharkabet, about how paleontologist Rainer Zangerl reportedly once discovered a large shale slab containing a long, eel-like fish covered in long, spine-like denticles characteristic of the genus, only to have it dry out and crumble into dust. As such, according to Zangerl's account, Troll reconstructs Listracanthus as resembling a tremendous, fiercely bristled frill shark. However, other authors have noted that Listracanthus-like denticles have been found associated with the remains of Menaspiformes like Deltoptychius (which do not have eel-like bodies), and have suggested that Listracanthus is a member of this group.

Martill et al., (2014) created the genus Acanthorhachis for the species formerly known as "Listracanthus" spinatus (Bolton, 1896). They also erected the family Listracanthidae to encompass the two genera.
