= Anachronistidae =

Anachronistidae Temporal range: Carboniferous–Permian

Scientific classification
- Kingdom: Animalia
- Phylum: Chordata
- Class: Chondrichthyes
- Subclass: Elasmobranchii
- Family: †Anachronistidae; Duffin and Ward, 1983

Genera
- Amaradontus; Cooleyella; Ginteria; Gunnellia; Reifella; Turovella

Extinct family of cartilaginous fish

Anachronistidae is an extinct family of cartilaginous fish, known from the Carboniferous and Permian periods. They are considered to be the oldest known members of Neoselachii (equivalent to Elasmobranchii in its narrow sense), with a close relationship to modern sharks and rays. They are only known from isolated teeth. They first appeared in Europe during the late Mississippian (Viséan), with Cooleyella which first appeared in Europe during the Early Carboniferous, dispersing into North America and South America during the Late Carboniferous and Permian, with Amaraodontus and Reifella known from the Late Carboniferous and Middle Permian of North America, respectively.
