= Chertovo Gorodishche =

Rock formation in Sverdlovsk Oblast, Russia

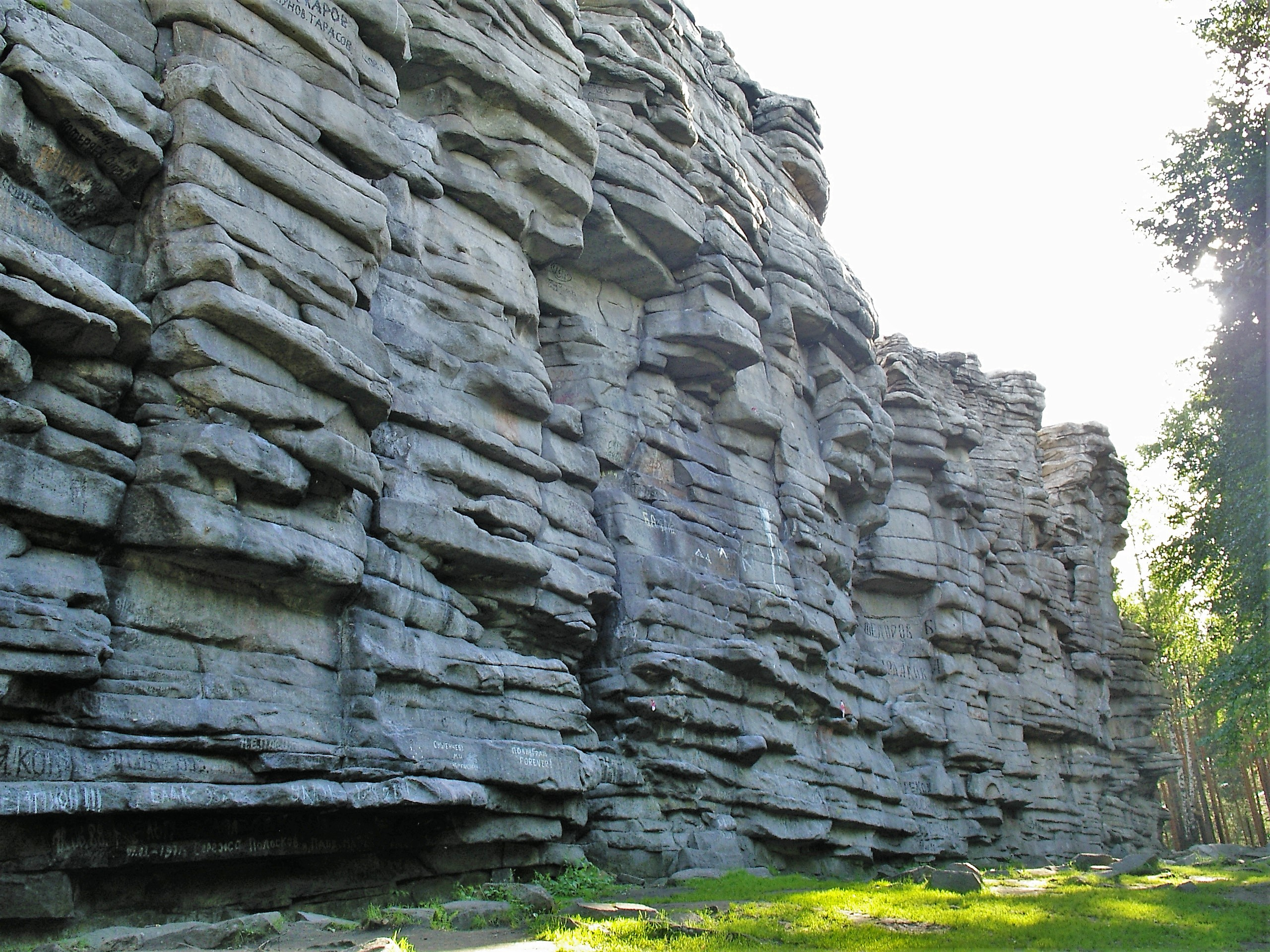

Highest point
- Elevation: 1,138 ft (347 m)
- Prominence: 20-25 meters

Naming
- Native name: Чёртово Городи́ще (Russian)

Geography
- Location: Iset, Sverdlovsk Oblast, Russia
- Parent range: Middle Urals

Geology
- Mountain type: 56°56′30″N 60°20′50″E

Chertovo Gorodishche, more commonly known as Devil's Settlement, Devil's Mound, or Devil's City, is a rock formation near Yekaterinburg in Sverdlovsk Oblast, Ural Federal District, Russia. Made from several types of rock, the formation is a tourist attraction and archeological site.

== Description ==
The rock formation at Chertova Gorodishche is 20 meters tall and located on top of a wooded mountain. The formation extends up the side of the mountain to the crest of a ridge, where the most prominent rocks are located. The rock making up the formation is composed of granite (part of the Verkh-Isetsky granite massif) with younger sedimentary rocks on top.

Located in a remote wooded area near a tributary of the Iset River, the formation has a long history of human visitation, with various artifacts being found at the site. Chertova Gorodishche was known to locals in the 19th century as an area of interest, though many viewed the rock formation with suspicion and as a place of evil. The first modern documentation of the site came in 1861 when a priest from Yekaterinburg, Vladimir Zakharovich Zemlyanitsyn, journeyed to the site. Zemlyanitsyn would bring two friends with him on his trip, and all three men would later become members of the Ural Society of Natural Science Lovers, which published an account of the formation in 1873. The society mounted a second expedition to the site in 1874, with the society's founder Onisim Kler himself joining. Kler would remark in his journal that the stones reminded him of Cyclopean structures, and in posed a rhetorical question in his account of the formation wondering if the stones were the work of an ancient people. The Ural Society of Natural Science Lovers organized a third trip to the site in 1889.

The formation grew more popular during the late 19th and early 20th century, and soon the many visitors to the site affected the local environment. During the Soviet era the formation was used as a rockwall. The site remains a popular tourist destination, and is a common subject for photographers.

=== Etymology ===
The name of the rock formation may derive from the word Chortan, which translates to front trade in the Mansi language. This may have been changed to Sortan or Sart-tan, which in turn led to the formation being associated with Satan, the Devil.
