= Chyortovo =

Chyortovo or Chertovo (Russian: Чёртово) may refer to:

- Lake Chyortovo, a lake in Yamalo-Nenets Autonomous Okrug, Russia
- Chertovo Gorodishche, a rock formation in Sverdlovsk Oblast, Russia
- Chyortovo koleso, a 1926 Soviet film
