= Meshkov House =

Historic building in Perm, Perm Krai, Russia

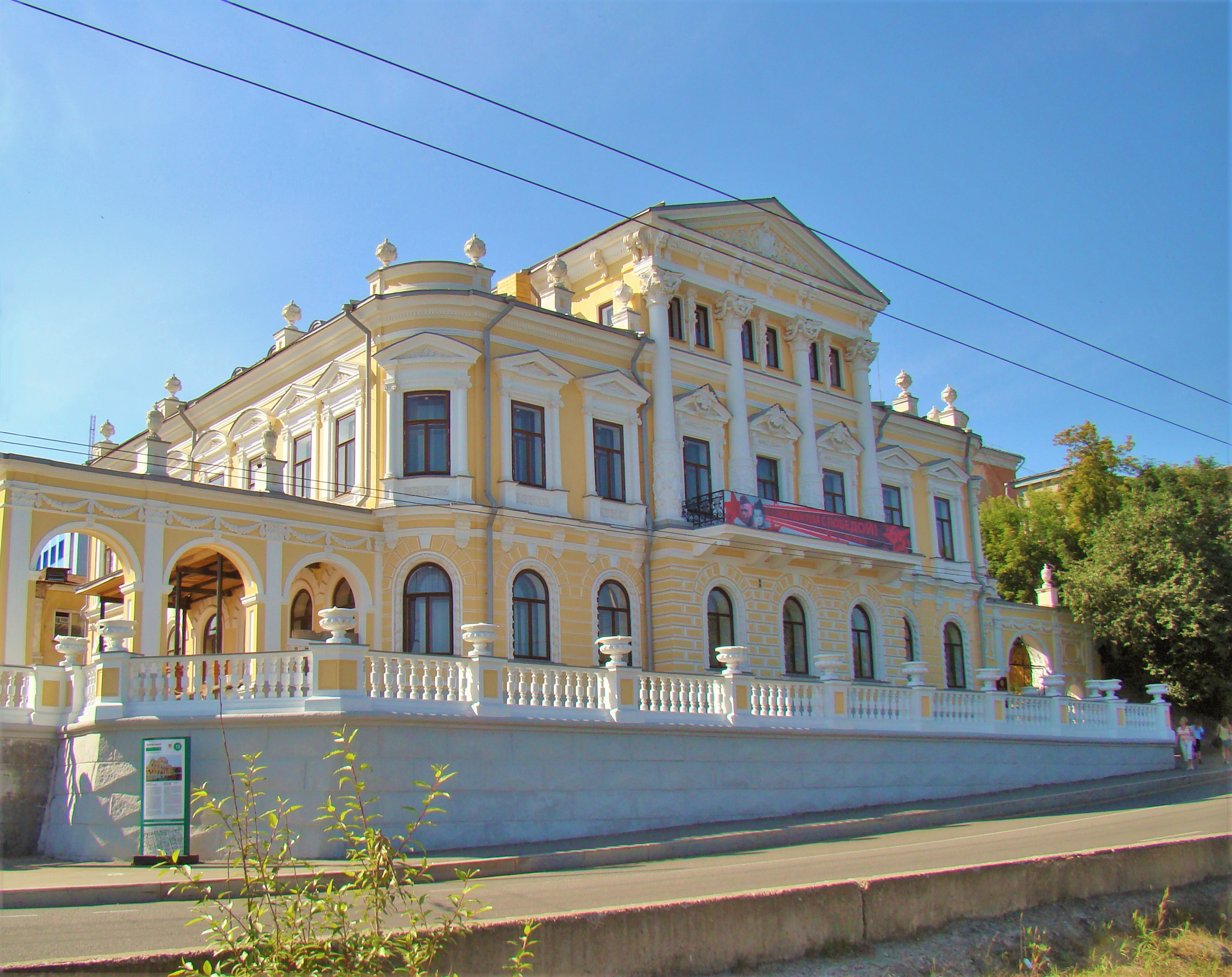
- Interactive map of Meshkov House
- 58.0188°N 56.2464°E
- Location: Perm, Perm Krai, Russia

History
- Built: 1887-1889
- Built for: Nikolai Meshkov

Site notes
- Architect: A. B. Turchevich
- Owner: Perm Regional Museum

The Meshkov Mansion (Russian: Дом Мешкова), also known as the Meshkov House, is a historic building in Perm, Perm Krai, Russia. Built between 1887 and 1889, the building served a number of roles through its history. The mansion is currently occupied by the Perm Regional Museum's main branch.

== Description ==
Located on the bank of the Kama river, he site of the current Meshkov mansion was historically occupied by several buildings. The first building was built in the 1820s, burned down and was rebuilt, and then burned down again in 1842. After the 1842 fire the site sat vacant for several decades until 1877, when prominent local industrialist Nikolai Meshkov purchased the lot and surrounding lands. Meshkov had been appointed as the head of a steamship company in 1875, and so was interested in investing in Perm, a regional hub for trade. In addition to buying the Meshkov property, the industrialist also funded the construction of several public buildings in Perm and constructed shipping piers across from the house.

Meshkov began to restore the property in 1887, employing prominent Permian architect A. B. Turchevich to construct the new mansion. Turchevich rebuilt the mansion in the style of Art Nouveau with classical overtones, with the house being adorned with decorative arches, Corinthian colonnades, and balconies. The exterior of the mansion was built using ornate plasterwork. Meshkov did not always occupy the residence, and as such parts of the building were used to house offices for a local shipping company.

The mansion was occupied by a number of different tenants, including a mining company and the local government. The medical school of Perm State University occupied parts of the building, as did a hotel. However, by the late 20th century the building had begun to fall into disrepair. Restoration work on the building began in 2007 in preparation for the building to become the new home of the Perm Regional Museum's main branch. The home is classified as a monument to urban planning and architecture by the Russian government.

=== Layout ===
The mansion consists of the main house, a two-story outbuilding, and carriage shed. The estate is surrounded by three retaining walls.

== Gallery ==
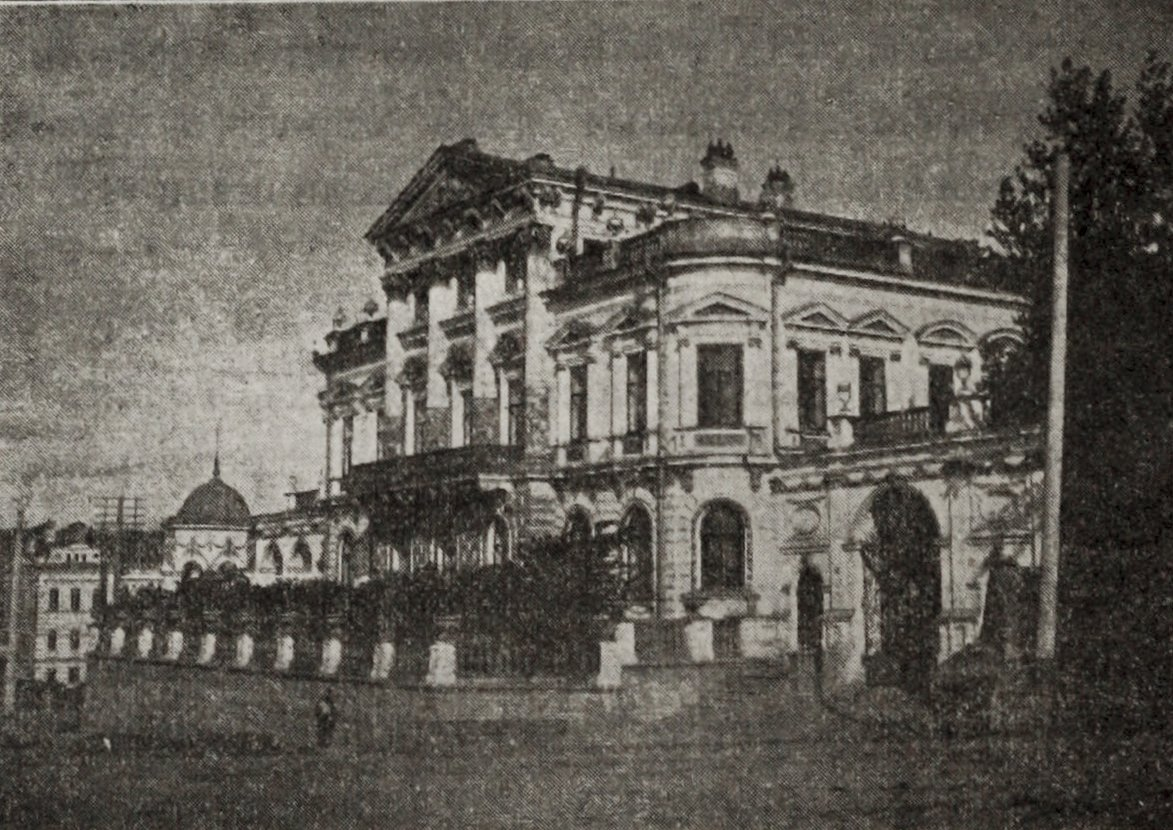
Meshkov House before 1913

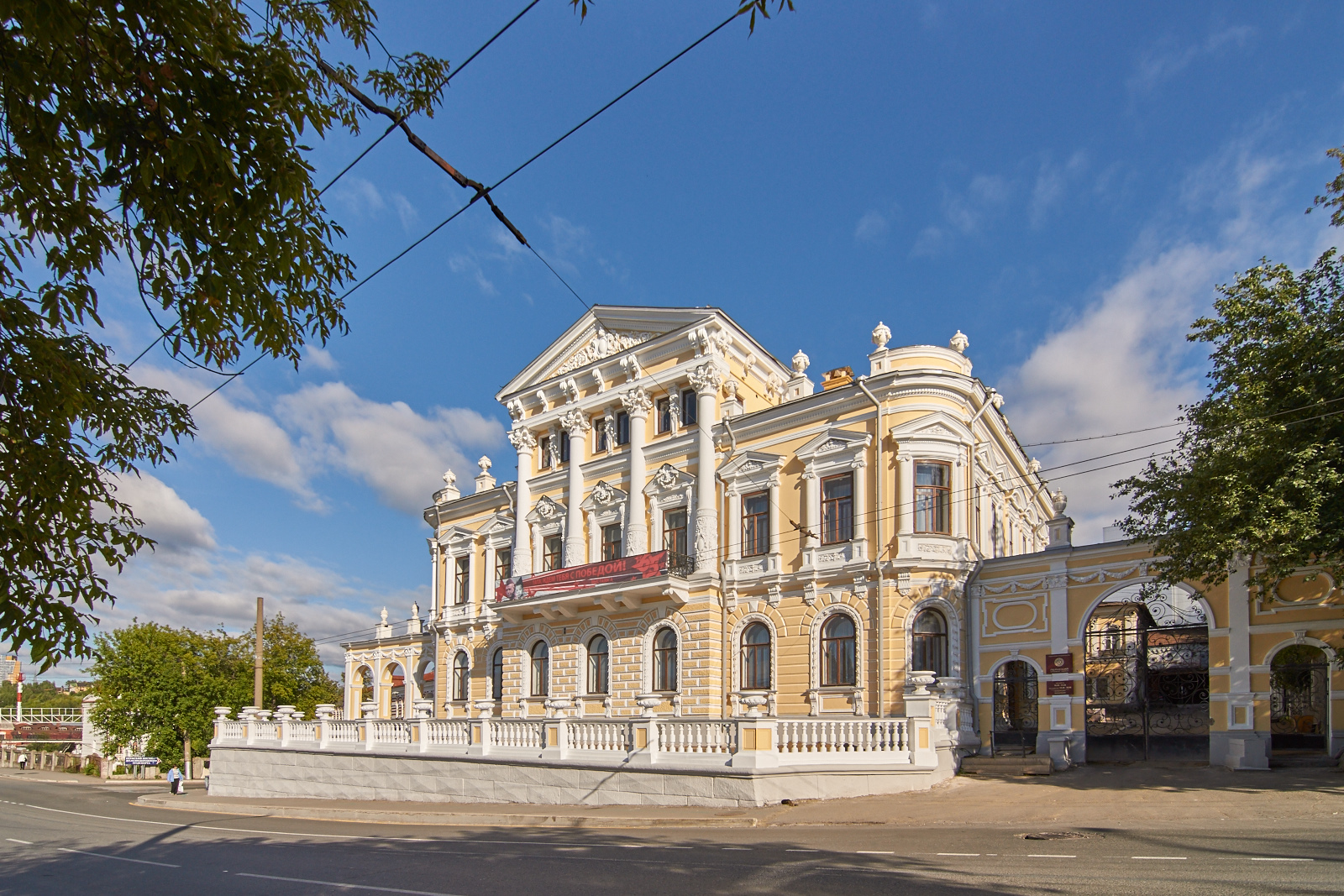
General view in 2010 after restoration

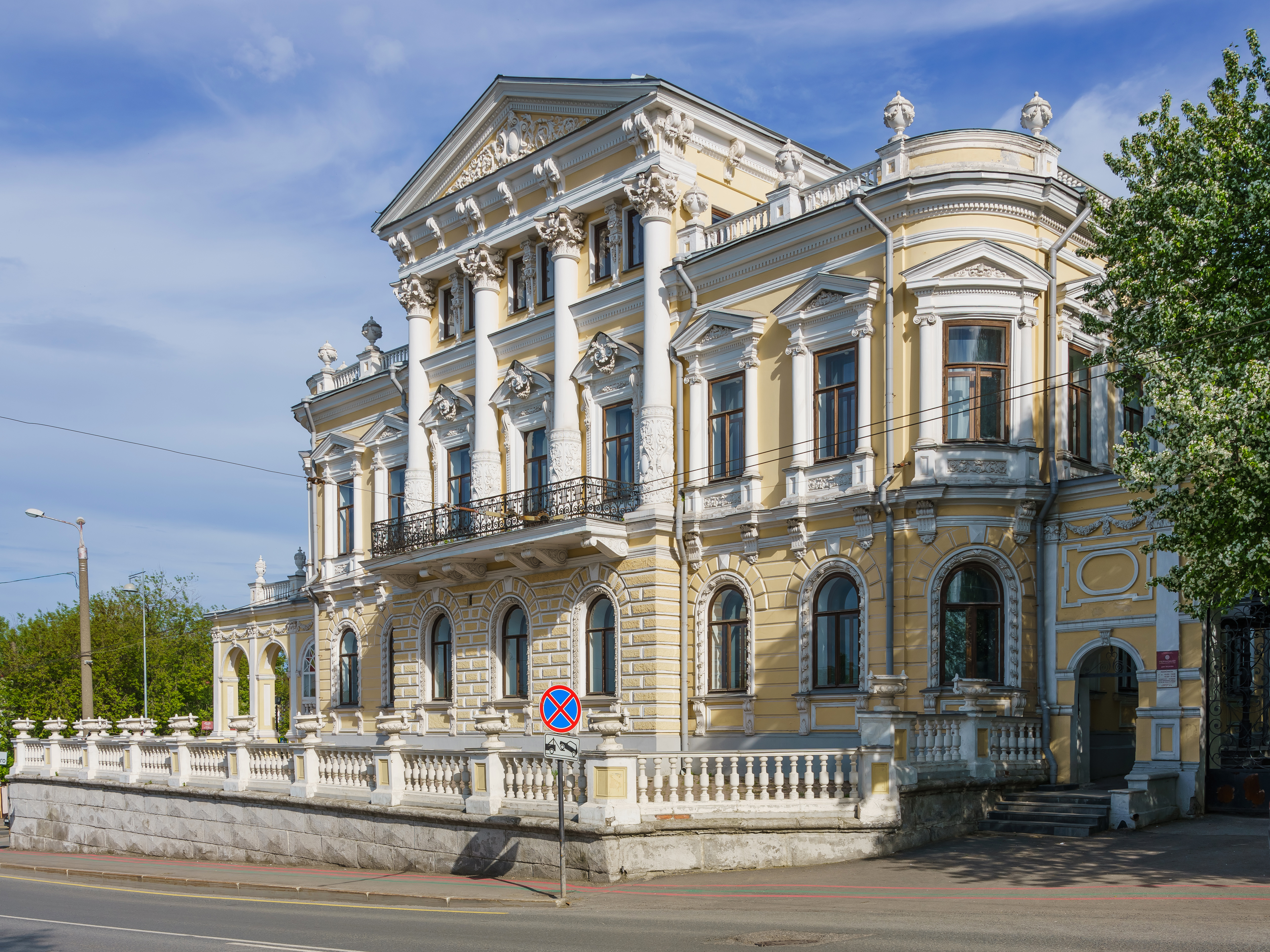
General view in 2019
