= Sverdlovsk Regional Museum of Local Lore =

Museum in Yekaterinburg, Russia

Coordinates: 56°49′N 60°36′E

Sverdlovsk Regional Museum
- Свердловский областной краеведческий музей имени О. Е. Клера
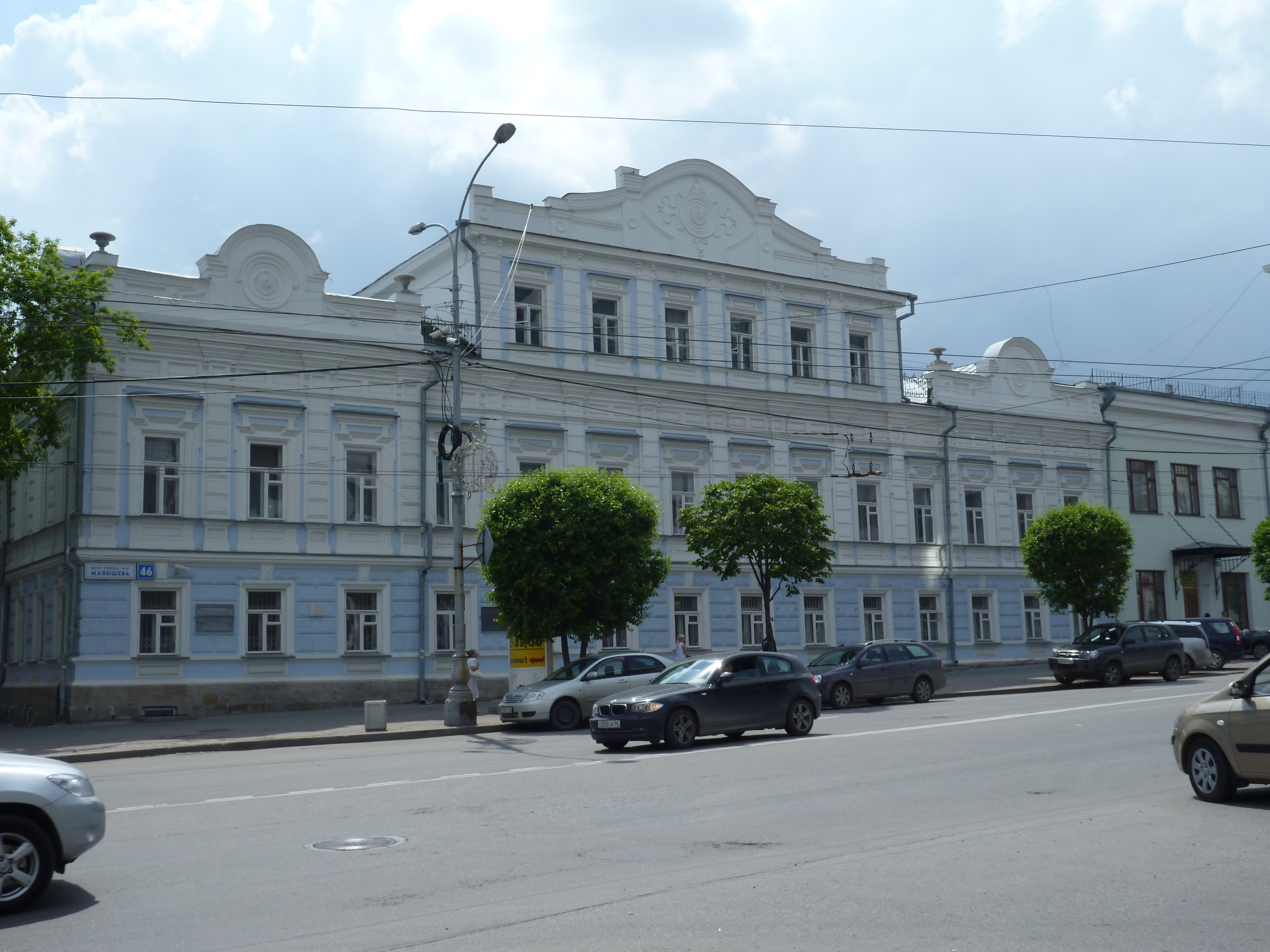
- Established: 1870
- Location: Yekaterinburg, Sverdlovsk Oblast, Russia
- Type: Local museum
- Website: uole-museum.ru

The Sverdlovsk Regional Museum of Local Lore (Russian: Свердловский областной краеведческий музей имени О. Е. Клера, abbreviated as SOCM) is a museum in Yekaterinburg, Sverdlovsk Oblast, Russia. The museum is one of the oldest in Yekaterinburg, having been founded in 1870. In addition the main branch of the museum, the institution manages several other museums in the region.

== Description ==
=== History ===
The museum's history began when in December 1870 a group of notables in Ekaterinburg founded the Ural Society of Natural Science Lovers (UOLE), an organization dedicated to improving education in the area. Though the organization was primarily founded to study the natural history of the Ural Mountains, many of its members had other interests, including meteorology and biology. As the organization expanded, it and its members gradually began to establish a collection of papers, arts, and artifacts. In 1887 the UOLE hosted a major exhibition in Ekaterinburg, an event which resulted in the organization gathering many donations and greatly expanding its existing collection.

In 1889 the UOLE opened its first physical location when it rented space in a local government building. This building remained in use until 1895 when a fire damaged both the building and the collection it housed. The city council of Ekaterinburg decided to allocate funds for the establishment of a new museum, but the project faced a number of delays and was eventually cancelled. As such, the museum was re-established in an older building that had been refurbished. Attendance grew with the population of Ekaterinburg, and according to one source 20,000 people visited the museum in 1920. The size of museum's collection also grew, as of 1912 the museum's collection had grown to over 30,000 items. The museum continued to operate as part of the UOLE, but in the 1920s the new Soviet government grew increasingly suspicious of the organization's activities (eventually dissolving it in 1929); as such, the museum was split off from the UOLE in 1925 and became an independent museum.

=== Collection ===
The Sverdlovsk Regional Museum of Local Lore has an extensive collection of artifacts. The museum's collection contains many archeological finds from the Ural region, including ancient bones, tools, and the famous Shigir Idol.

=== Branches ===
In addition to the main museum in Yekaterinburg, SOCM operates 10 other museums in the region.
