= Mesolithic =

Prehistoric period, second part of the Stone Age

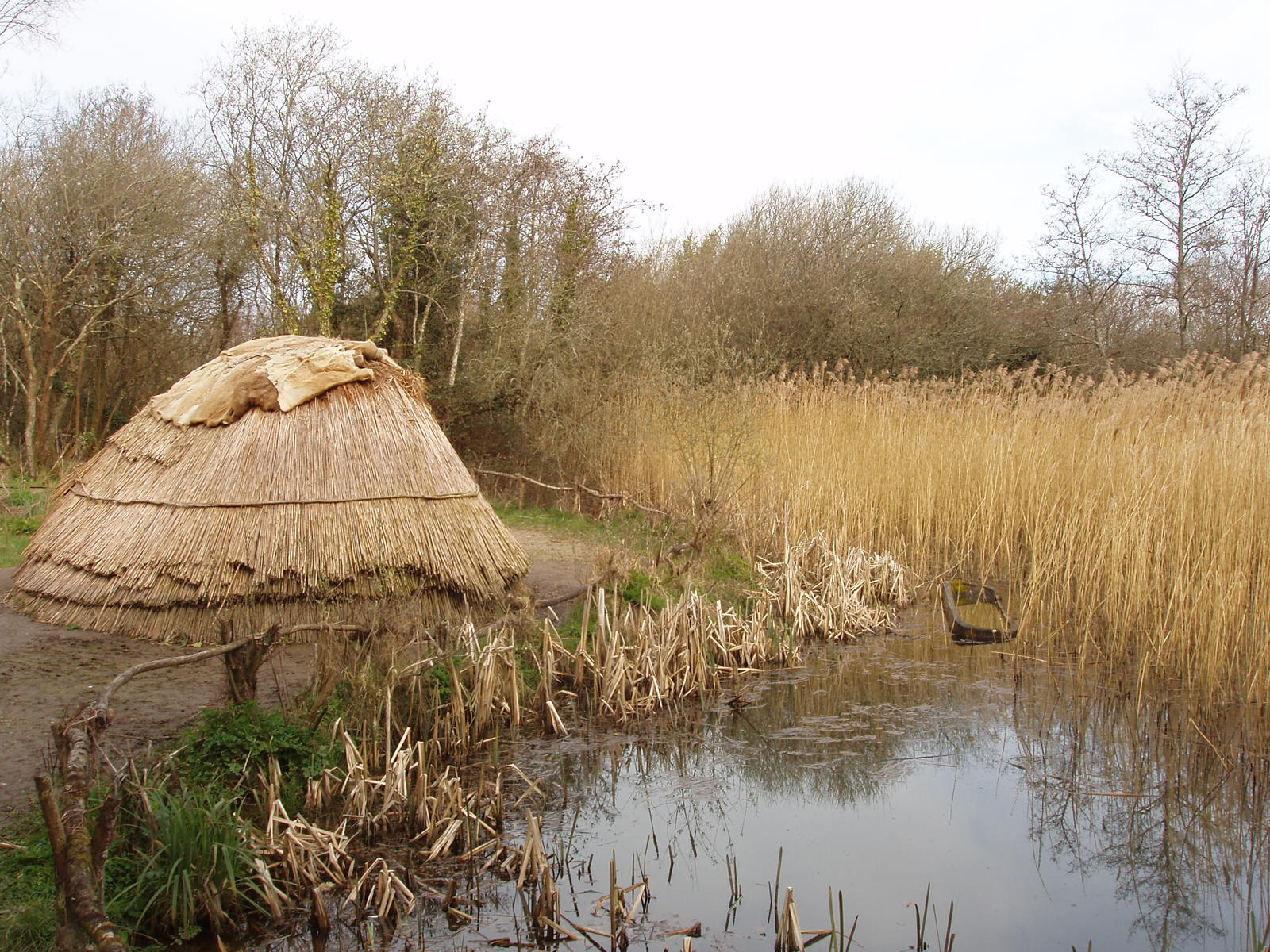
- Reconstruction of a "temporary" Mesolithic house in Ireland; waterside sites offered good food resources.
- Alternative names: Epipaleolithic (for the Near East)
- Geographical range: Europe
- Period: Middle of Stone Age
- Dates: 20,000 to 10,000 BP (Middle East); 15,000–5,000 BP (Europe)
- Preceded by: Upper Paleolithic
- Followed by: Neolithic

The Mesolithic (Greek: μέσος, mesos 'middle' + λίθος, lithos 'stone') is the Old World archaeological period between the Upper Paleolithic and the Neolithic. The term Epipaleolithic is often used synonymously, especially for outside Northern Europe, and for the corresponding period in the Levant and Caucasus. The Mesolithic has different time spans in different parts of Eurasia. It refers to the final period of hunter-gatherer cultures in Europe and the Middle East, between the end of the Last Glacial Maximum and the Neolithic Revolution. In Europe it spans roughly 15,000 to 5,000 BP; in the Middle East (the Epipalaeolithic Near East) roughly 20,000 to 10,000 BP. The term is less used of areas farther east, and not at all of those beyond Eurasia and North Africa.

The culture associated with the Mesolithic varies between areas, but it is associated with a transition from group hunting of large animals to a broader hunter-gatherer way of life, and the development of more sophisticated and typically smaller lithic tools and weapons. Agriculture is considered as the transition to the Neolithic, but some sites considered Mesolithic indicate some use of pottery and textiles. The more permanent settlements tend to be close to the sea or inland waters offering a good supply of food. Mesolithic societies are not seen as very complex, and burials are fairly simple, unlike the grandiose burial mounds of the Neolithic.

== Terminology ==
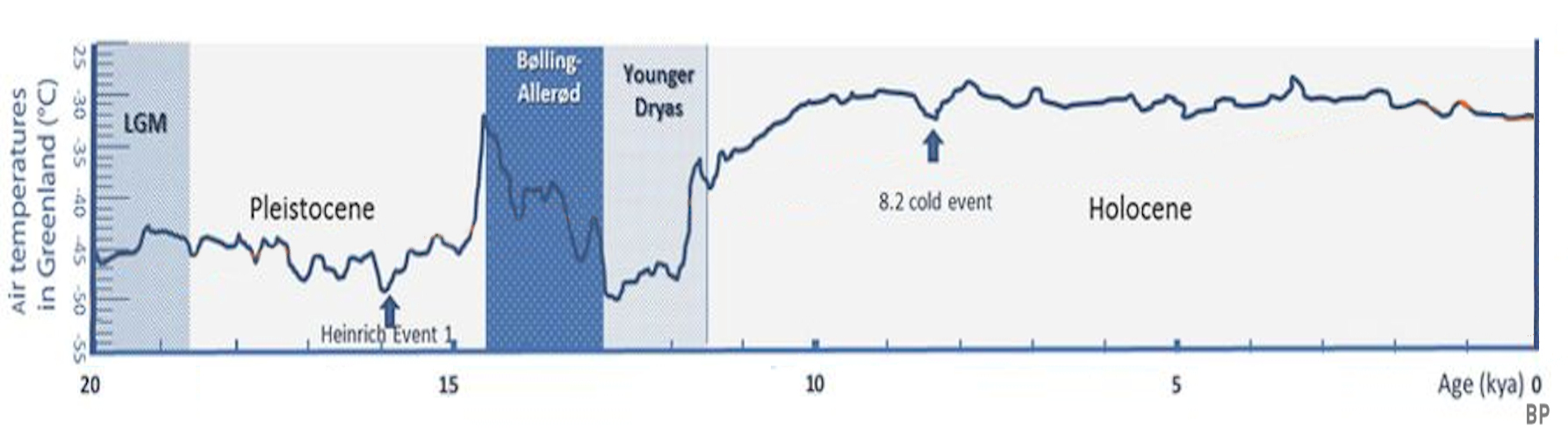
The Mesolithic begins during the latest Pleistocene, characterized by a progressive rise of temperatures, between the end of the Last Glacial Maximum and the Neolithic Revolution during the Holocene. Evolution of temperature in the Post-Glacial period according to Greenland ice cores.

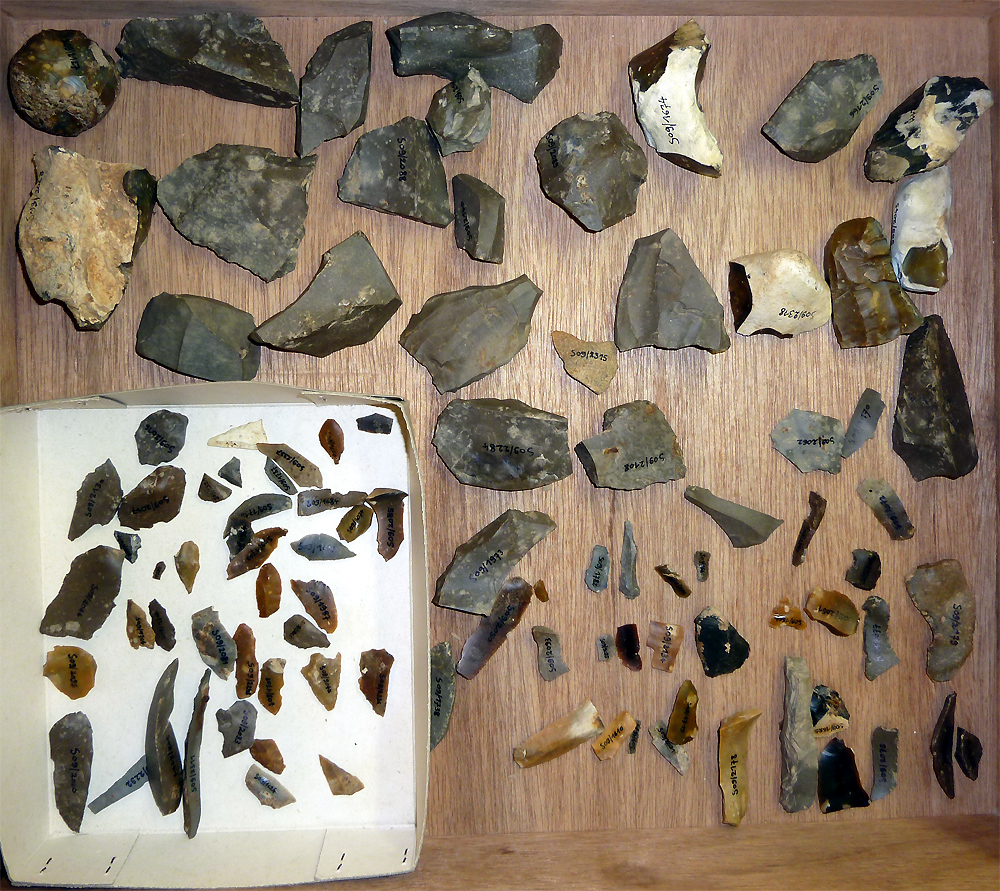
Mesolithic artifacts

The terms "Paleolithic" and "Neolithic" were introduced by John Lubbock in his work Pre-historic Times in 1865. The additional "Mesolithic" category was added as an intermediate category by Hodder Westropp in 1866. Westropp's suggestion was immediately controversial. A British school led by John Evans denied any need for an intermediate: the ages blended together like the colors of a rainbow, he said. A European school led by Gabriel de Mortillet asserted that there was a gap between the earlier and later.

Edouard Piette claimed to have filled the gap with his naming of the Azilian Culture. Knut Stjerna offered an alternative in the "Epipaleolithic", suggesting a final phase of the Paleolithic rather than an intermediate age in its own right inserted between the Paleolithic and Neolithic.

By the time of Vere Gordon Childe's work, The Dawn of Europe (1947), which affirms the Mesolithic, sufficient data had been collected to determine that a transitional period between the Paleolithic and the Neolithic was indeed a useful concept. However, the terms "Mesolithic" and "Epipalaeolithic" remain in competition, with varying conventions of usage. In the archaeology of Northern Europe, for example for archaeological sites in Great Britain, Germany, Scandinavia, Ukraine, and Russia, the term "Mesolithic" is almost always used. In the archaeology of other areas, the term "Epipaleolithic" may be preferred by most authors, or there may be divergences between authors over which term to use or what meaning to assign to each. In the New World, neither term is used (except provisionally in the Arctic).

"Epipaleolithic" is sometimes also used alongside "Mesolithic" for the final end of the Upper Paleolithic immediately followed by the Mesolithic. As "Mesolithic" suggests an intermediate period, followed by the Neolithic, some authors prefer the term "Epipaleolithic" for hunter-gatherer cultures who are not succeeded by agricultural traditions, reserving "Mesolithic" for cultures who are clearly succeeded by the Neolithic Revolution, such as the Natufian culture. Other authors use "Mesolithic" as a generic term for hunter-gatherer cultures after the Last Glacial Maximum, whether they are transitional towards agriculture or not. In addition, terminology appears to differ between archaeological sub-disciplines, with "Mesolithic" being widely used in European archaeology, while "Epipalaeolithic" is more common in Near Eastern archaeology.

== Europe ==
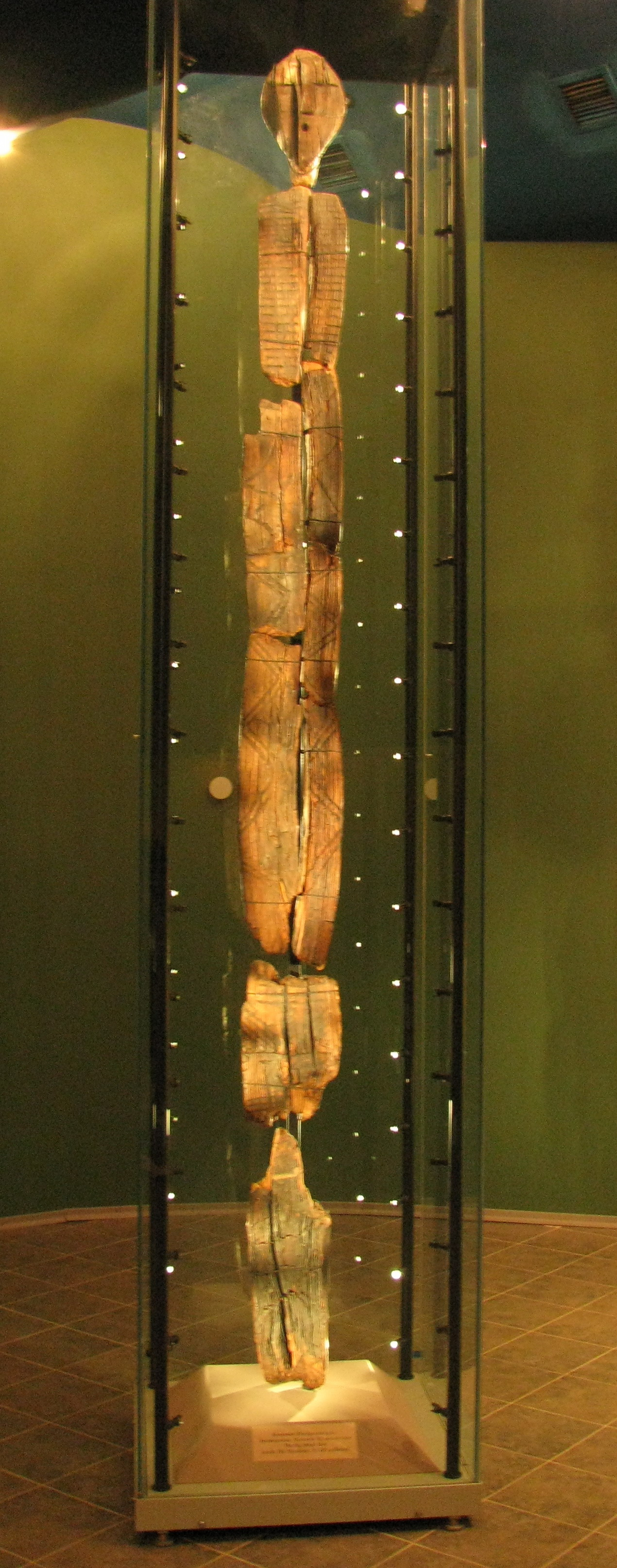
The Shigir Idol, from the east of the Ural Mountains.

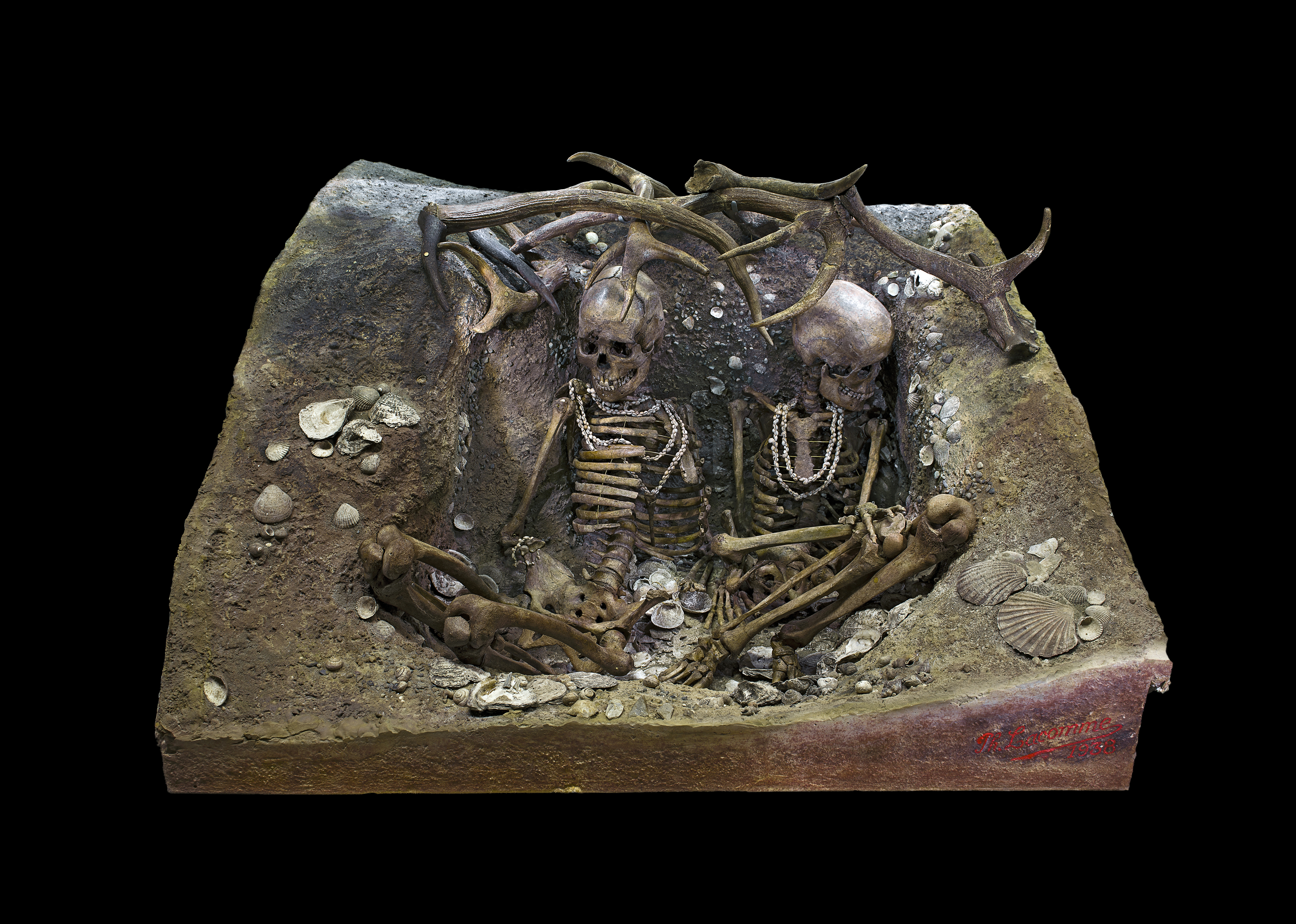
Two skeletons of women aged between 25 and 35 years, dated between 6740 and 5680 BP, both of whom died a violent death. Found at Téviec, France in 1938.

The Balkan Mesolithic begins around 15,000 years ago, in the Franco-Cantabrian region 14,000 years ago (called Azilian) and in other parts of Europe by 11,500 years ago (the beginning of the Holocene). The Mesolithic ends with the introduction of farming, depending on the region between c. 8,500 and 5,500 years ago. Regions where the end of the last glacial period had greater environmental effects have a much clearer Mesolithic era, lasting millennia. For example, in northern Europe societies could live well on rich food supplies from the marshlands created by the warming climate. Such conditions produced distinctive human behaviors preserved in the material record, such as the Maglemosian and Azilian cultures. Such conditions also delayed the Neolithic until some 5,500 BP in northern Europe.

One of the Mesolithic's most defining features is the type of stone toolkit. The Mesolithic used a microlithic technology – composite devices manufactured with Mode V chipped stone tools (microliths), unlike the Modes I–IV used in the Paleolithic. However, a macrolithic technology was used in the Mesolithic in some areas such as Ireland, parts of Portugal, the Isle of Man and the Tyrrhenian Islands. In the Neolithic, microlithic technology was replaced by a macrolithic technology with an increased use of polished stone tools.

There is some evidence for the beginning of construction at sites with a ritual or astronomical significance, including Stonehenge, with a short row of large post holes aligned east–west, and a possible "lunar calendar" at Warren Field in Scotland, with pits of post holes of varying sizes, thought to reflect the lunar phases. Both are dated to before c. 9,000 BP (the 8th millennium BC).

An ancient chewed gum made from the pitch of birch bark revealed that a woman enjoyed a meal of hazelnuts and duck about 5,700 years ago in southern Denmark. Mesolithic people influenced Europe's forests by bringing favored plants like hazel with them.

As the "Neolithic package" (including farming, herding, polished stone axes, timber longhouses and pottery) spread into Europe, the Mesolithic way of life was marginalized and eventually disappeared. Adoption of a farming lifestyle by hunter-gatherer communities was facilitated by long-term close contact with farming communities and those communities' openness to new members. Mesolithic adaptations such as sedentism, population size and use of plant foods are cited as evidence of the transition to agriculture. However, some Mesolithic communities rejected the Neolithic package likely due to ideology. In one sample from the Blätterhöhle in Hagen, it seems that the descendants of Mesolithic people maintained a foraging lifestyle for more than 2000 years after the arrival of farming; such societies may be called "Subneolithic". In north-Eastern Europe, the hunting and fishing lifestyle continued into the Medieval period in regions less suited to agriculture. And Scandinavia has no accepted Mesolithic period, and instead has locally preferred "Older Stone Age" and "Younger Stone Age".

=== Art ===
There is less surviving art from the Mesolithic than the preceding Upper Paleolithic and the following Neolithic. The Rock art of the Iberian Mediterranean Basin, which probably spreads across from the Upper Paleolithic, is a widespread phenomenon, much less well known than the cave-paintings of the Upper Paleolithic. The sites are now mostly cliff faces in the open air, and the subjects are now mostly human rather than animal, with large groups of small figures; there are 45 figures at Roca dels Moros. Clothing is shown, and scenes of dancing, fighting, hunting and food-gathering. The figures are much smaller than the animals of Paleolithic art, and depicted much more schematically, though often in energetic poses. A few small engraved pendants with suspension holes and simple engraved designs are known, some from northern Europe in amber, and one from Star Carr in Britain in shale. The Elk's Head of Huittinen is a rare Mesolithic animal carving in soapstone from Finland.

The rock art in the Urals appears to show similar changes after the Paleolithic, and the wooden Shigir Idol is a rare survival of what may well have been a very common material for sculpture. It is a plank of larch carved with geometric motifs, but topped with a human head. Now in fragments, it would have stood over five metres tall. The Ain Sakhri figurine from Palestine is a Natufian carving in calcite.

A total of 33 antler frontlets have been discovered at Star Carr. These are red deer skulls modified to be worn by humans. Modified frontlets have also been discovered at Bedburg-Königshoven, Hohen Viecheln, Plau, and Berlin-Biesdorf.

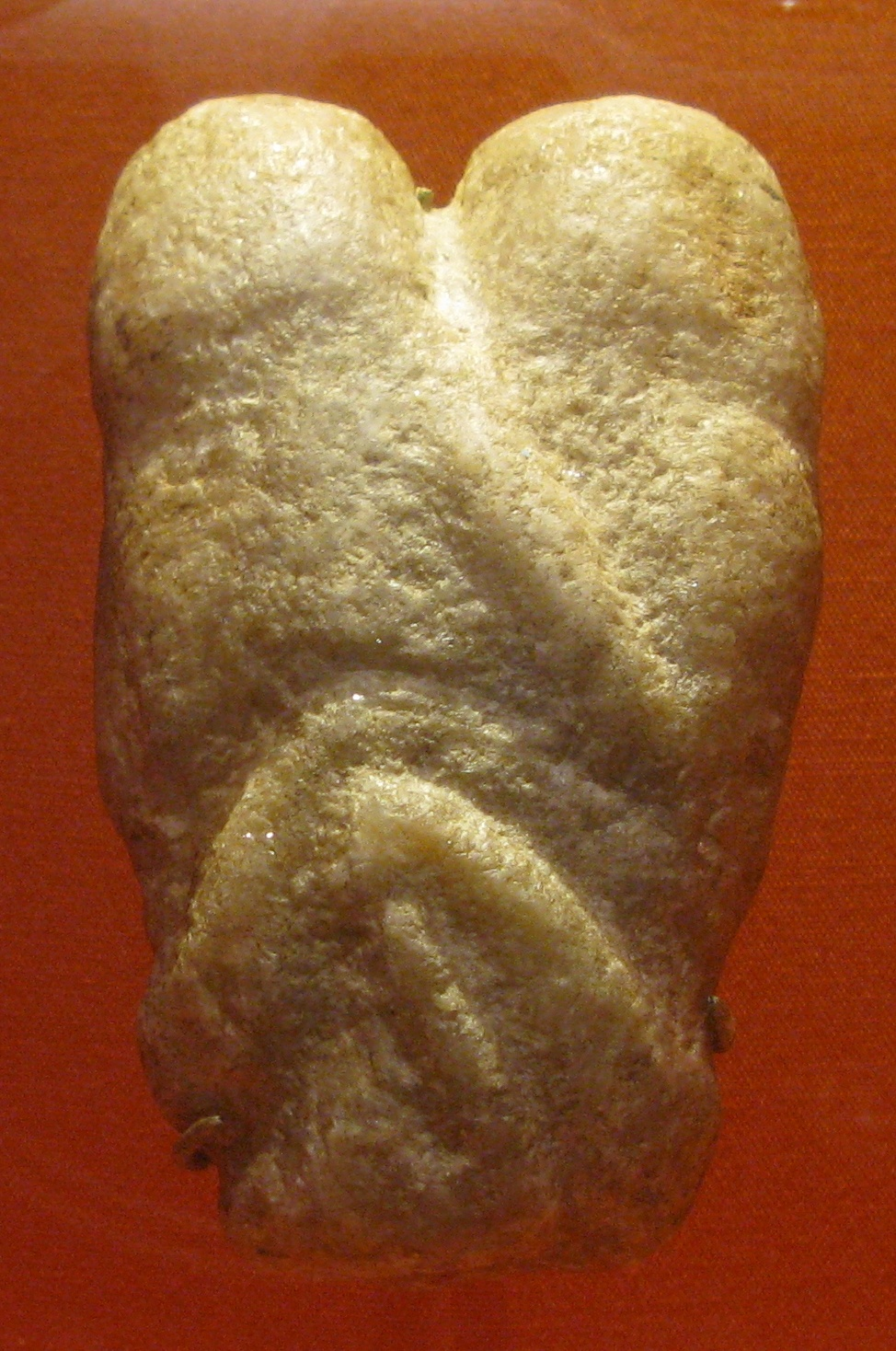
The Ain Sakhri lovers; c. 9000 BCE (late Epipalaeolithic Near East); calcite; height: 10.2 cm, width: 6.3 cm; from Ain Sakhri (near Bethlehem, Palestine); British Museum (London)

Animated image showing the sequence of engravings on a pendant excavated from the Mesolithic archaeological site of Star Carr in 2015

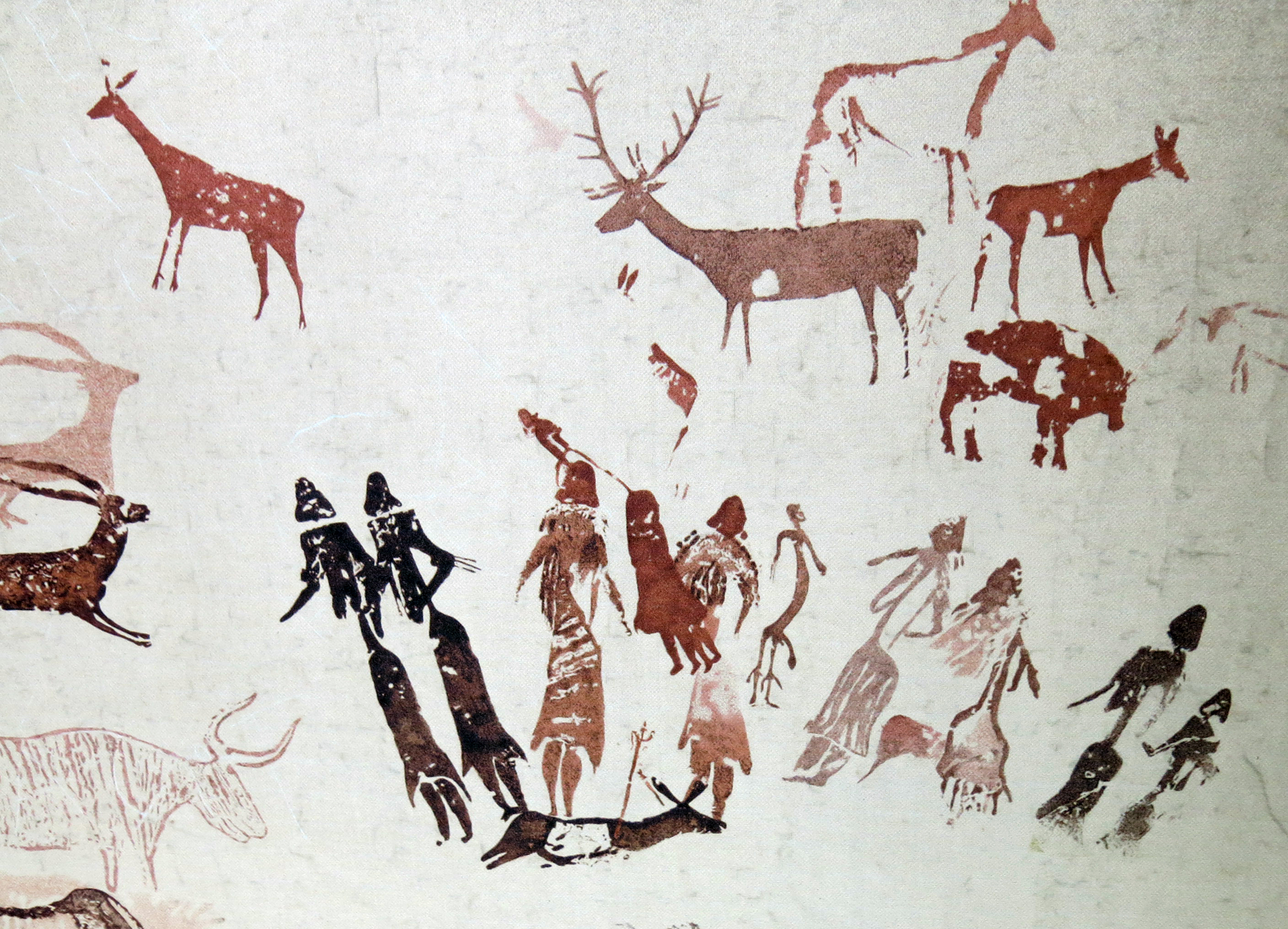
Roca dels Moros, Spain, The Dance of Cogul, tracing by Henri Breuil

=== Weaving ===
Weaving techniques were deployed to create shoes and baskets, the latter being of fine construction and decorated with dyes. Examples have been found in Cueva de los Murciélagos in Southern Spain that in 2023 were dated to 9,500 years ago.

=== Ceramic Mesolithic ===
Pottery-making cultures or "ceramic Mesolithic" can be distinguished between c. 9,000 to 5,850 ago in north-eastern Europe, Siberia, and some southern European and North African sites. Russian archaeologists describe them as Neolithic, even though farming is absent. This pottery-making Mesolithic culture is found peripheral to the sedentary Neolithic cultures. Its pottery was distinct, with point or knob base and flared rims, and made by methods not used by Neolithic farmers. Although each area of Mesolithic ceramic developed an individual style, common features suggest a single origin. The earliest finds of this type of pottery may be in the region around Lake Baikal in Siberia. It appears in the Yelshanka culture on the Volga 9,000 years ago, and from there spread via the Dnieper-Donets culture to the Narva culture of the Eastern Baltic. Spreading westward along the coastline it is found in the Ertebølle culture of Denmark and Ellerbek of Northern Germany, and the related Swifterbant culture of the Low Countries.

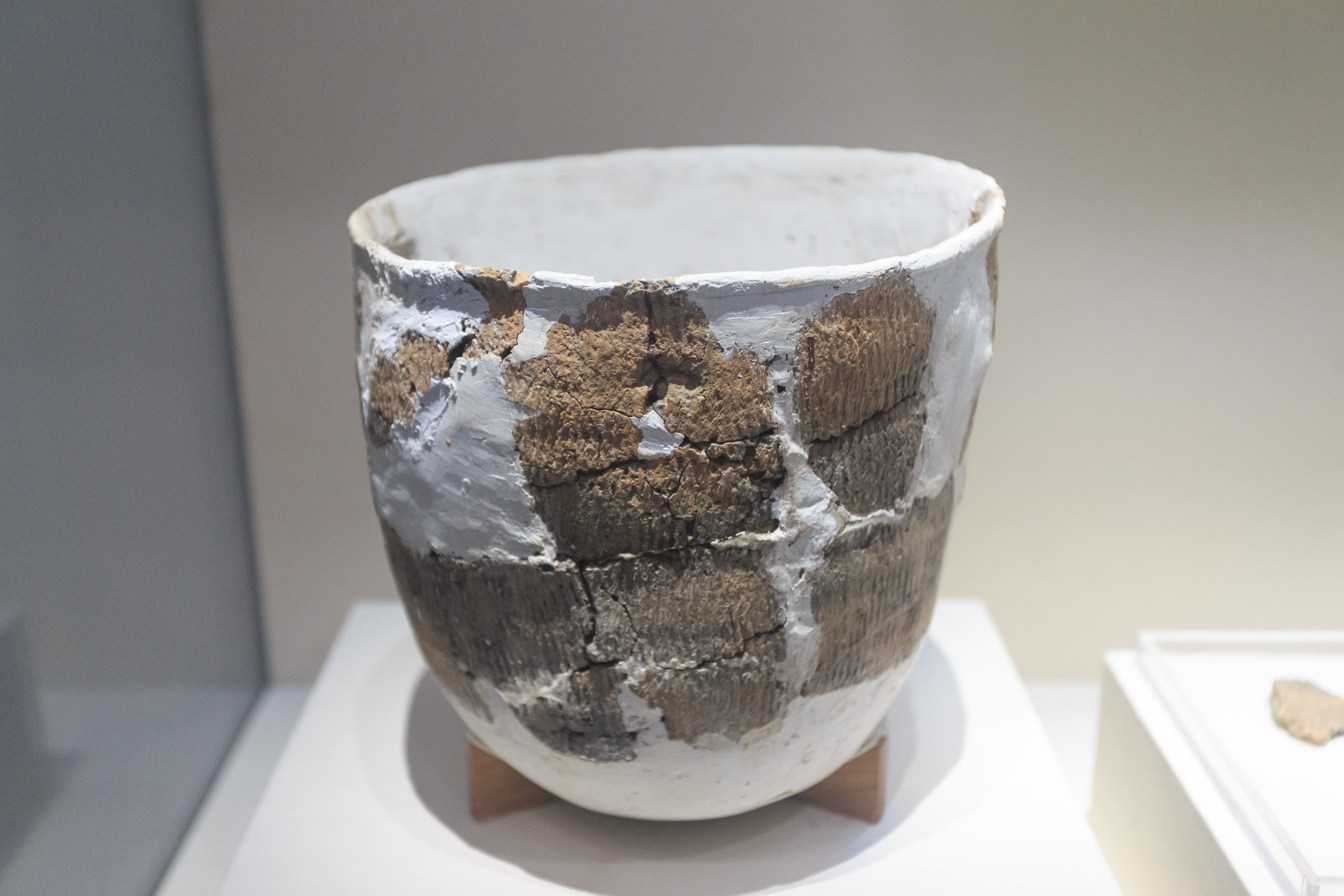
Pottery with re-construction repairs found in Xianrendong cave, dating to 20,000–10,000 years ago.

However, the earliest pottery known in the world was found in 2012 in Xianrendong cave in China, dating by radiocarbon to between 20,000 and 19,000 years ago, at the end of the Last Glacial Period. The date was established by carefully carbon-14 dating surrounding sediments. Many of the pottery fragments had scorch marks, suggesting that the pottery was used for cooking. These early pottery containers were made well before the invention of agriculture around 10,000 to 8,000 BC, by mobile foragers who hunted and gathered their food during the Late Glacial Maximum.

=== Cultures ===
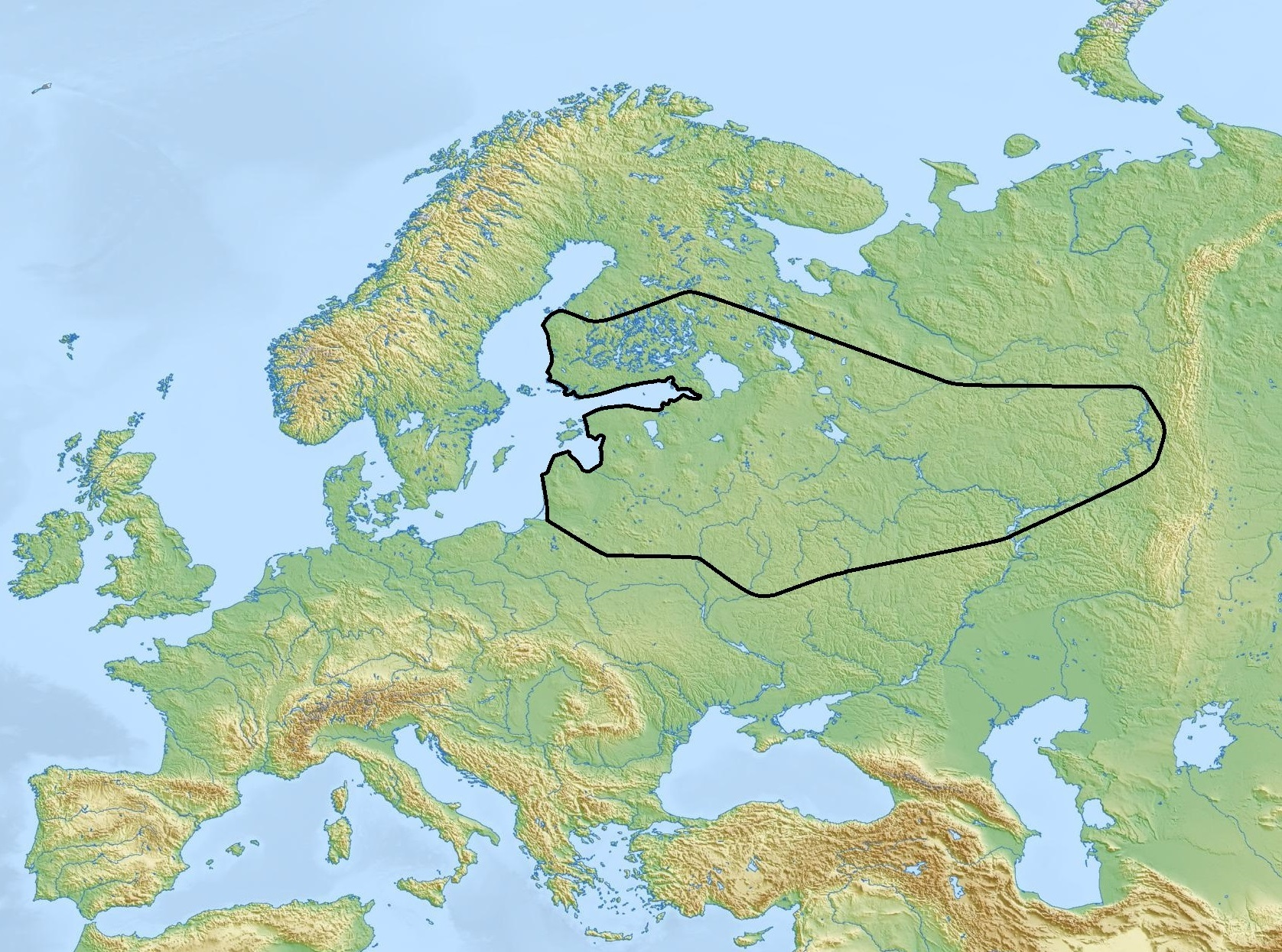
Comb Ceramic culture existed from around 4200 BC to around 2000 BC. The bearers of the culture are thought to have still mostly followed the Mesolithic hunter-gatherer lifestyle.

Geographical range	Periodization	Culture	Temporal range	Notable sites
Southeastern Europe (Greece, Aegean)	Balkan Mesolithic		15,000–7,000 BP	Franchthi, Theopetra
Southeastern Europe (Romania/Serbia)	Balkan Mesolithic	Iron Gates culture	13,000–5,000 BP	Lepenski Vir
Western Europe	Early Mesolithic	Azilian	14,000–10,000 BP	
Northern Europe (Norway)		Fosna-Hensbacka culture	12,000–10,500 BP	
Northern Europe (Norway)	Early Mesolithic	Komsa culture	12,000–10,000 BP	
Central Asia (Middle Urals)			12,000–5,000 BP	Shigir Idol, Vtoraya Beregovaya
Northeastern Europe (Estonia, Latvia and northwestern Russia)	Middle Mesolithic	Kunda culture	10,500–7,000 BP	Lammasmägi, Pulli settlement
Northern Europe		Maglemosian culture	11,000–8,000 BP	
Western and Central Europe		Sauveterrian culture	10,500–8,500 BP	
Western Europe (Great Britain)	British Mesolithic		11,000–6000 BP	Star Carr, Howick house, Gough's Cave, Cramond, Aveline's Hole
Western Europe (Ireland)	Irish Mesolithic		11,000–5,500 BP	Mount Sandel
Western Europe (Belgium and France)		Tardenoisian culture	10,000–5,000 BP	
Central and Eastern Europe (Belarus, Lithuania and Poland)	Late Mesolithic	Neman culture	9,000–5,000 BP	
Northern Europe (Scandinavia)		Nøstvet and Lihult cultures	8,200–5,200 BP	
Northern Europe (Scandinavia)		Kongemose culture	8,000–7,200 BP	
Northern Europe (Scandinavia)	Late Mesolithic	Ertebølle	7,300–5,900 BP	
Western Europe (Netherlands)	Late Mesolithic	Swifterbant	7,300–5,400 BP	
Western Europe (Portugal)	Late Mesolithic		7,600–5,500 BP	

== Outside Europe ==
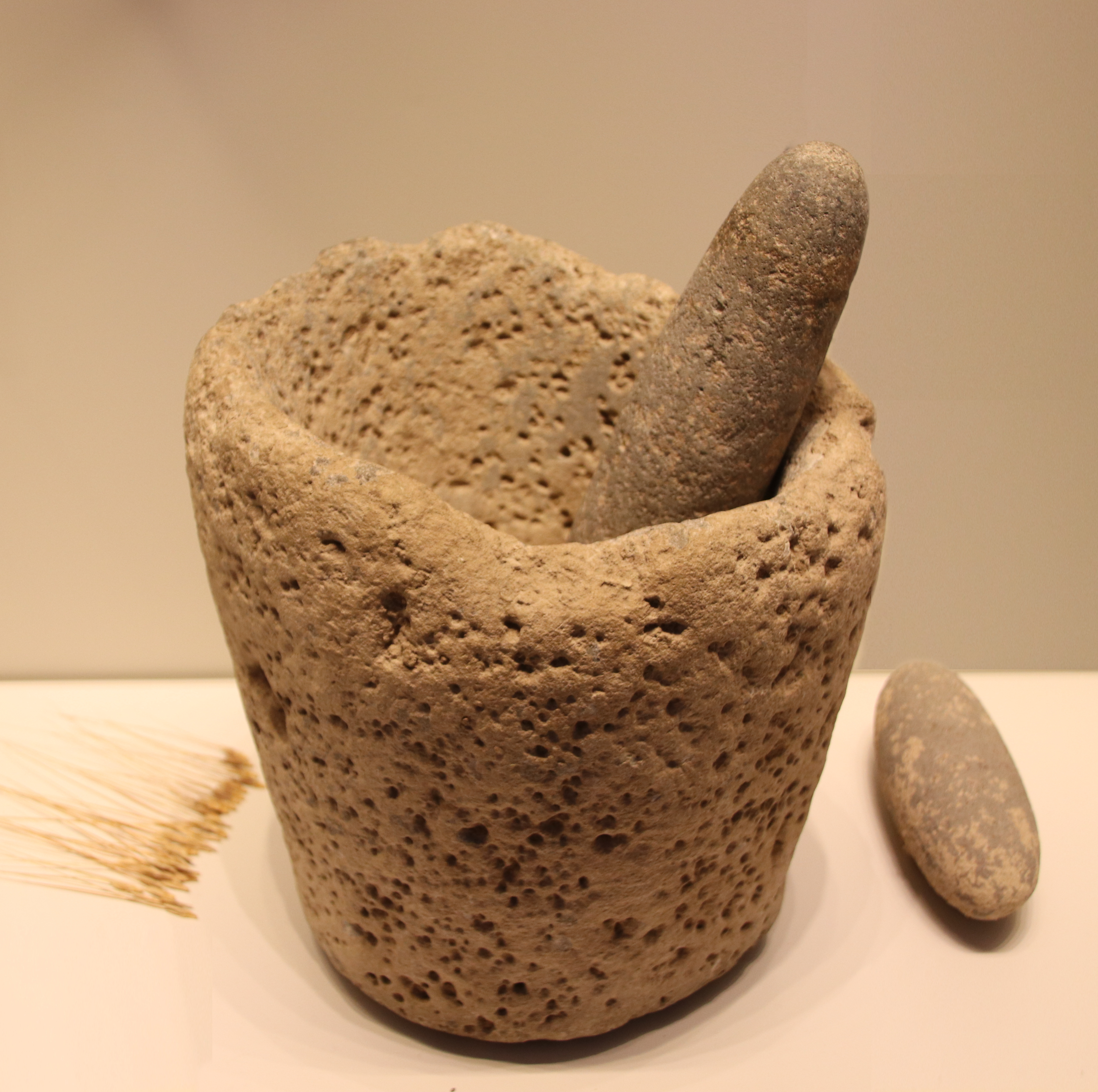
Mesolithic stone mortar and pestle, Kebaran culture, Epipaleolithic Near East. 22,000–18,000 BP

While "Paleolithic" and "Neolithic" have been useful concepts in the archaeology of China, and are mostly accepted, "Mesolithic" was introduced later, mostly after 1945, and does not appear to be a necessary or useful term in the context of China. Chinese sites that have been regarded as Mesolithic are better considered Early Neolithic.

In the archaeology of India, the Mesolithic, dated roughly between 12,000 and 8,000 BP, remains a concept in use.

In the archaeology of the Americas, an Archaic or Meso-Indian period, following the Lithic stage, somewhat equates to the Mesolithic.

The Saharan rock paintings found at Tassili n'Ajjer in central Sahara, and at other locations depict vivid scenes of everyday life in central North Africa. Some of these paintings were executed by a hunting people who lived in a savanna region teeming with a water-dependent species like the hippopotamus, animals that no longer exist in the now-desert area.

Geographical range	Periodization	Culture	Temporal range	Notable sites
North Africa (Morocco)	Late Upper Paleolithic to Early Mesolithic	Iberomaurusian culture	24,000–10,000 BP	
North Africa		Capsian culture	12,000–8,000 BP	
East Africa		Kenya Mesolithic	8,200–7,400 BP	Gamble's cave
Central Asia (Middle Urals)			12,000–5,000 BP	Shigir Idol, Vtoraya Beregovaya
East Asia (Japan)	Jōmon cultures		16,000–2,350 BP	
East Asia (Korea)	Jeulmun pottery period		10,000–3,500 BP	
South Asia (Indian subcontinent)	South Asian Stone Age		12,000–4,000 BP	Bhimbetka rock shelters, Chopani Mando, Lekhahia

== See also ==
- Caucasus hunter-gatherer
- History of archery § Prehistory
- List of Stone Age art
- List of Mesolithic settlements
- Mammoth extinction
- Eastern Hunter-Gatherer
- Scandinavian Hunter-Gatherer
- Western Hunter-Gatherer
- Anatolian hunter-gatherers
- Younger Dryas
