= Lekhahia =

Mesolithic site in Uttar Pradesh, India

Lekhahia is a Mesolithic site in Uttar Pradesh, India. It yielded skeletons remains form Rock Shelter 1. Some of its findings are pre-microlithic. It is situated in Mirzapur district of UP. Lekhahia rock shelter is located about three kilometers east of Gasor village. In the following year, in order to confirm the results of the excavations at Morhana Pahar and Baghaikhor, excavations were conducted near the rock shelters and specifically at Rock Shelters No. 1 and 2.

== Excavation Details ==
Excavation Outside the Rock Shelter

Two trenches were excavated south of Lekhahia Rock Shelter No. 1 to a maximum depth of three feet. Each trench measured 20 feet in length and 10 feet in width. The deposits revealed during excavation were divided into nine layers based on color and structure. These deposits lay above the weathered bedrock. The in-situ weathering of the bedrock, the abundance of worn stone nodules, and lateritic pellets in the deposit indicate that the formation of Layers 9 and 8 occurred due to intense climatic fluctuations between hot and humid conditions. On the basis of structure, Layers 7 and 6 suggest that the climate during their formation was less intense compared to earlier phases. The structure of Layer 5 indicates a transitional phase between the earlier Layers 9 to 6 and the later Layers 4 to 1. The deposits from Layers 4 to 1 were formed as a result of increasing aridity. The archaeological materials obtained from these deposits are similar to those from Morhana Pahar and Baghaikhor. From Layers 8 and 7, non-geometric tools were recovered. The tool assemblage includes parallel-sided blades, backed blades, points, lunates, scrapers, and cores. A large number of waste flakes were also found. In Layers 6 and 5, triangles appear in addition to the above tools. Trapezes are absent, and pottery is completely lacking. This suggests that among geometric forms, triangles were used before trapezes, and pottery began to be used after the introduction of geometric tools. From Layers 4 to 1, both geometric and non-geometric tools were found. Similar material was also recovered from other trenches at Lekhahia. In one trench (LKH-II-B), relatively long and broad blades were found in the lowest level, closely resembling Upper Palaeolithic blade traditions.

Excavation at Lekhahia Rock Shelter No. 1

At Lekhahia Rock Shelter No. 1, a trench measuring 17 × 8 feet was excavated to a maximum depth of 1 foot 5 inches. As a result of this excavation, 17 skeletons were brought to light. All were extended burials. A large number of microlithic tools were found with them. On the basis of stratigraphy, fourteen skeletons were divided into eight chronological phases. Except for Skeleton Nos. II and XII, all skeletons were laid with the head towards the west and the feet towards the east. Skeleton No. II had its head towards the south, and Skeleton No. XII towards the north. After osteological examination, it was determined that ten skeletons belonged to males and three to females. The skeletal remains were studied by J. R. Lukacs. He suggested that, in addition to the fourteen complete skeletons, partial remains indicate the presence of more burials. On the basis of fragmentary bones, it is estimated that there may have been at least 27 human burials at the site. Along with the skeletons, animal bones such as deer antlers, a shell, and a buffalo rib were found. Along with microlithic tools, ochre and rubbed laterite pellets were also recovered, possibly used for making pigment. The proportion of non-geometric and geometric tools associated with the skeletons is as follows:

Phase	Skeleton	Non-Geometric Tools	Geometric Tools
I	II	56%	44%
II	III	57%	43%
III	IV	73%	27%
IV	V	75%	25%
V	V, VIII, IX, XI	79%	21%
VI	XIII, XV	90%	10%
VII	XVI	81%	18.18%
VIII	XVII	99%	1%

== Dating record ==
Two radiocarbon dates were initially obtained from Lekhahia: TF-419: 2410 ± 115 BCE; TF-417: 1710 ± 910 BCE

In addition, two more recent radiocarbon dates have been obtained: GX-20983-AMS: 8,370 ± 75 BP GX-20984-AMS: 8,000 ± 75 BP
