= Shigir Idol =

Oldest known wooden sculpture

Coordinates: 57.3809°N 60.1407°E

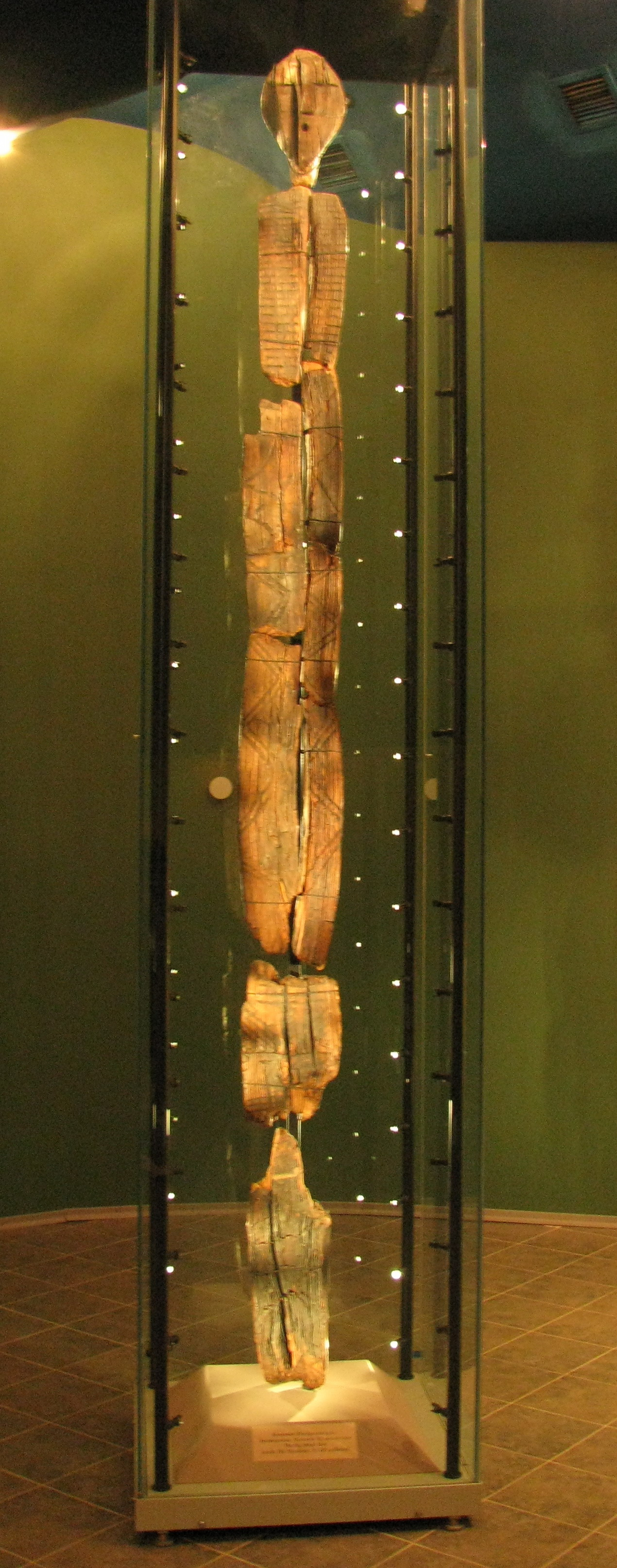
- The sculpture as displayed in the Sverdlovsk Regional Museum of Local Lore
- Material: Wood
- Height: 2.8 m (possibly more than 5m originally)
- Created: c. 11,500 years ago
- Discovered: 24 January 1890; Perm Governorate, Russia
- Present location: Sverdlovsk Regional Museum of Local Lore (Yekaterinburg, Sverdlovsk, Russia)

The Shigir Sculpture, or Shigir Idol (Russian: Шигирский идол), is the oldest known wooden sculpture. It is estimated to have been carved c. 11,500 years ago, or during the early Holocene period, and is twice as old as Egypt's Great Pyramid. The wood it was carved from is approximately 12,000 years old.

It was discovered in 1890 in a Russian peat bog, and is displayed in the Sverdlovsk Regional Museum of Local Lore in Yekaterinburg, Russia.

== Discovery ==
The sculpture was discovered on January 24, 1890 at a depth of 4 m (13 ft) in the peat bog of Shigir, on the eastern slope of the Middle Urals, near the village of Kalata (modern Kirovgrad) and approximately 100 km (62 mi) from Yekaterinburg. Investigations in this area had begun 40 years earlier, after the discovery of a variety of prehistoric objects in an open-cast gold mine.

It was extracted in ten parts. Professor D. I. Lobanov combined the main fragments to reconstitute a sculpture 2.8 m (9.2 ft) high.

In 1914, archaeologist Vladimir Tolmachev proposed a variant of this reconstruction by integrating the unused fragments. His reconstruction suggested that the original height of the statue was 5.3 m (17.4 ft).

Later, some of these fragments were lost, so only Tolmachev's drawings of them remain.

== Dating ==
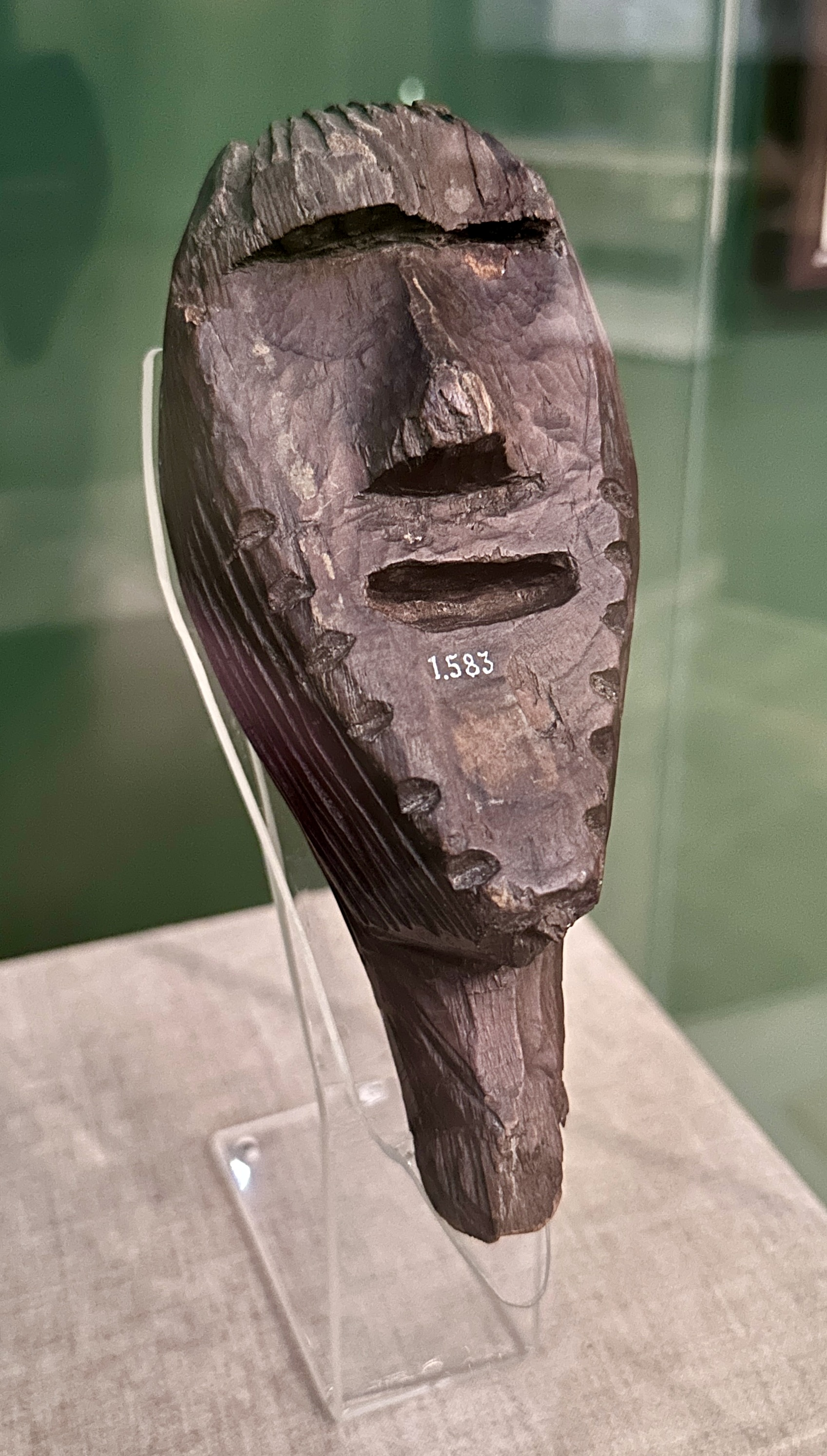
The "small" Shigir Idol.

The initial radiocarbon dating carried out by G. I. Zajtseva of the Institute of the History for the Material Culture in Saint-Petersburg, confirmed by the Geological Institute of Russian Academy of Sciences in Moscow, gave an age of around 9,500 years. In the 1990s, when this first radiocarbon dating was carried out, scholars suggested that the dating was incorrect, because they believed that the hunter-gatherers who inhabited the area 9,500 years ago would have been incapable of crafting and decorating such a massive object.

A later German analysis gave an age of 11,500 years. It is the most ancient wooden sculpture of its kind known in the world. Typically, wood degrades in most environments and does not endure for archaeological discovery as readily as other materials such as stone and metal - unless in peat. A decorated antler was found near the Shigir Idol and dated to the same period, giving credence to the estimated age of 11,500 years.

In 2021, in the journal Quaternary International, researchers from the University of Göttingen, and the Institute of Archeology of the Russian Academy of Sciences published the results of a series of recent AMS-results dating the Idol close to the beginning of the Holocene (c. 10,000 years ago). This dating makes it the oldest known monumental wooden sculpture in the world. Researchers note that, while any direct parallel to this find is not yet known, nevertheless, the contextualization can be assisted by some very limited evidence of wooden objects from the Palaeolithic and Mesolithic.

The geometric decorations, such as simple lines and zigzags of the Idol are commonly found in Late Palaeolithic and Early Mesolithic decorations. Thus, various elements of the Shigir sculpture are consistent with the record of Late Glacial to Early Mesolithic art in Eurasia.

== Description ==
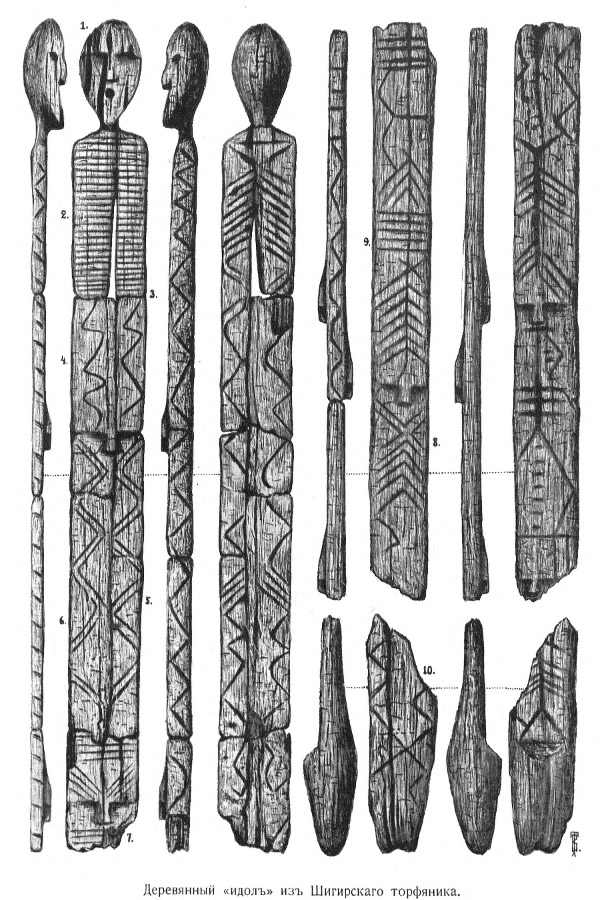
Some of the lower faces on the sculpture are visible in this image

The sculpture is carved from larch. As identified from the annual rings, the tree was at least 159 years old when felled. Stone tools were used for carving the markings. The top portion is a head with a face with eyes, nose, and mouth. The body is flat and rectangular. Geometrical motifs decorate its surface, including zigzag lines and depictions of human faces and hands. Horizontal lines at the level of the thorax may represent ribs, and lines broken in chevrons cover the rest of what often is described as the body; however, along with the face at the top, several faces are visible at various points along the sculpture. The arrangement resembles a totem pole.

Scholars have proposed various theories about the carvings' meaning. Svetlana Savchenko, a researcher at the Sverdlovsk Regional Museum, suggested that the decoration tells the creation myth those who carved it believed in. Other researchers at the museum have suggested that the markings could have served as a navigational aid or map. Mikhail Zhilin, an archaeologist at the Institute of Archaeology in Moscow, guessed that the statue could depict mythological creatures such as forest spirits. Archeologist Peter Vang Peterson, of the National Museum of Denmark, speculated that the idol could serve as a warning not to enter a dangerous area.

Scholars noted that the Shigir Idol's decoration was similar to that of the oldest known monumental stone ruins, at Göbekli Tepe in Turkey.

The ornamentation on the sculpture was carved using three different sizes of chisels. In addition, following his 2014 examination of the sculpture, Zhilin discovered another face in the sculpture and asserted that the faces were carved last of all, using tools made from the lower jaw bones of a beaver, with sharpened incisor teeth. A beaver jaw tool from the same period was found at the Beregovaya 2 site.

The discovery upended scholars' views on when humans began making ritual art, as opposed to the kind of realistic art seen in the Lascaux caves. Scientists had previously believed that complex art comparable to the Shigir Idol began in sedentary farming populations in the Middle East around 8,000 years ago.

== Preservation ==
Zhilin stated that the sculpture was made from the larch, which is naturally phytoncidic, then preserved in a bog that had an acid, anaerobic environment, which kills microorganisms and also has a tanning effect. Scientists suspect that many more statues like the Shigir Idol existed, but that they did not benefit from the same unusual conditions and therefore were not preserved.

== See also ==
- List of stone age art
