= Perm Regional Museum =

Museum in Perm, Perm Krai, Russia

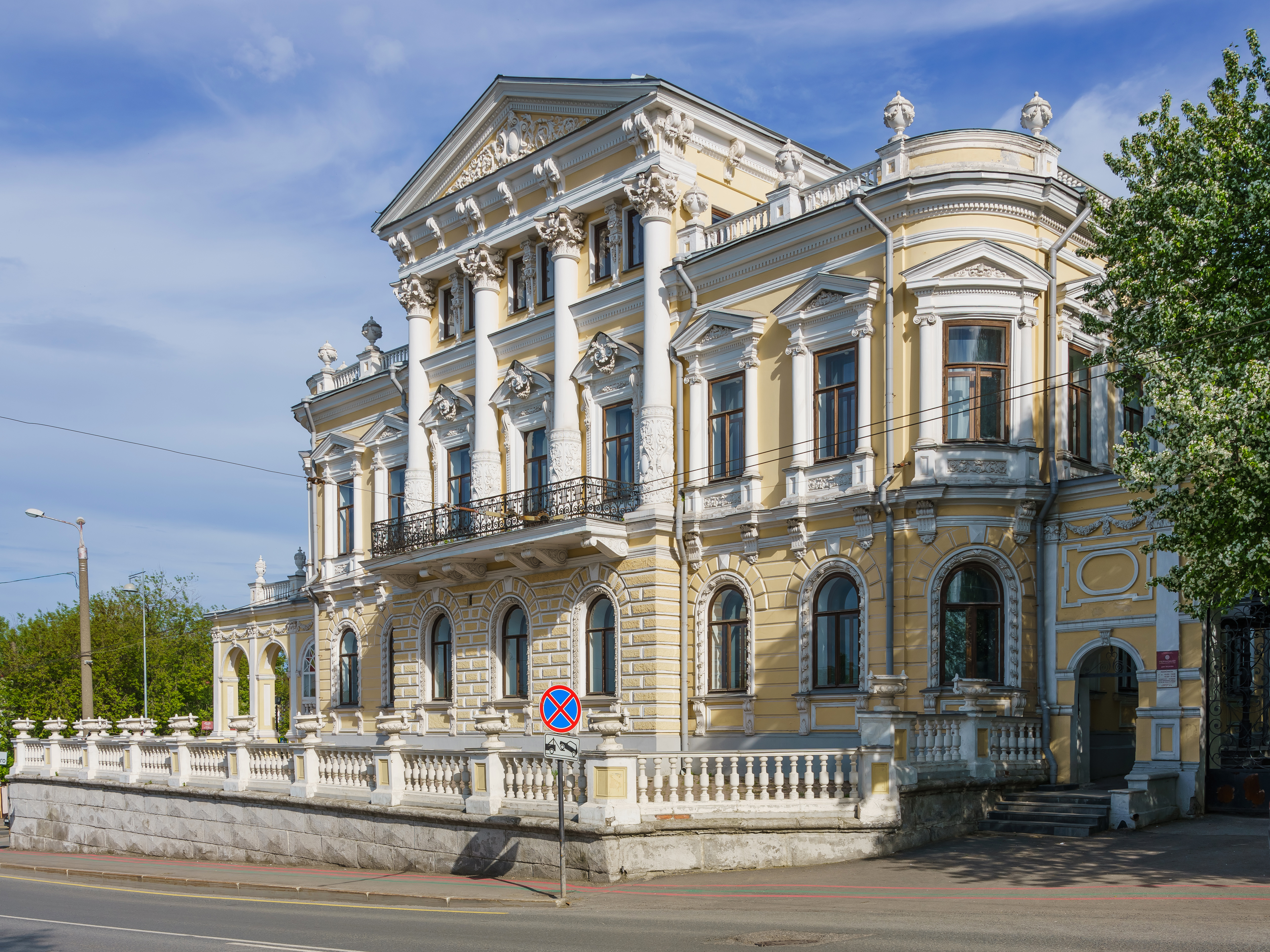
- Exterior of the museum's main building in 2019
- Established: 1890
- Location: Perm, Perm Krai, Russia
- Coordinates: 58.0187°N 56.2466°E
- Website: www.museum.perm.ru

The Perm Regional Museum, also known as the Perm Museum of Local Lore, is a museum located in Perm, Perm Krai, Russia. Founded in 1890, the museum is the oldest and largest museum in Perm. The museum maintains a number of permanent and temporary exhibitions and is a tourist attraction.

== Description ==
=== History ===
In 1870, a group of Russian intellectuals founded the Ural Society of Natural Science Lovers in Yekaterinburg. The society was dedicated to studying the natural sciences, specifically those related to the natural history of the Ural Mountains and surrounding area. The society continued to expand its areas of study and its membership, eventually establishing commissions in several cities. In November 1890, a new commission held its first meeting in Perm, and this date is considered to be the founding date of the modern Perm museum. The commission began to work on establishing a public museum in Perm, and this first building opened to the public on 25 January 1894.

In 1897, the museum moved to a new location on Petropavlovskaya street. Accompanying the move was the foundation of a new society, which renamed the museum to the Perm Scientific and Industrial Museum. The new museum offered free educational courses and lectures by notable scientists. In 1901 the museum would sponsor a program (the Mobile Museum of Teaching Materials) to assist local schools in teaching about pedagogical literature. According to the museum, it was the only institution of higher education in Perm until the establishment of Perm State University in 1916.

Following the Russian Revolution and subsequent formation of the Soviet Union in 1919, the museum was able to keep open. However, in 1920 state funding to the museum was severely reduced, leaving the museum with only enough money to keep the building maintained and heated. The Soviet era also saw the museum move several times, first to a former bishop's residence in 1920, then a former haberdashery factory in 1931, then to the hostel of a former medical institute in 1941. However, the museum was gradually granted properties including mothballed buildings and grounds formerly belonging to the church. In addition, the museum was able to keep the majority of its collection intact and was able to acquire new artifacts. The museum was renamed to the Perm Regional Museum of Local Lore in 1957.

The museum continued to expand in the later Soviet era, reacquiring some of its older properties and absorbing some smaller museums in the region. The institution survived the dissolution of the Soviet Union and thrived in the Russian Federation, collaborating with the State Historical Museum in Moscow to host a major exhibition on Perm in 2000. The museum acquired its current name in 2007, and in November of that year the museum's main building was relocated to its current location, the historic Meshkov House.

=== Collection ===
The museum gradually built up its collection over its century-long history. The museum acquired a number of archeological and cultural artifacts (some donated by prominent locals), as well as an extensive collection of fossils and bones. In addition to the main collection at the museum's main building, the museum operates nine other branches in Perm and the surrounding area.

== Gallery ==
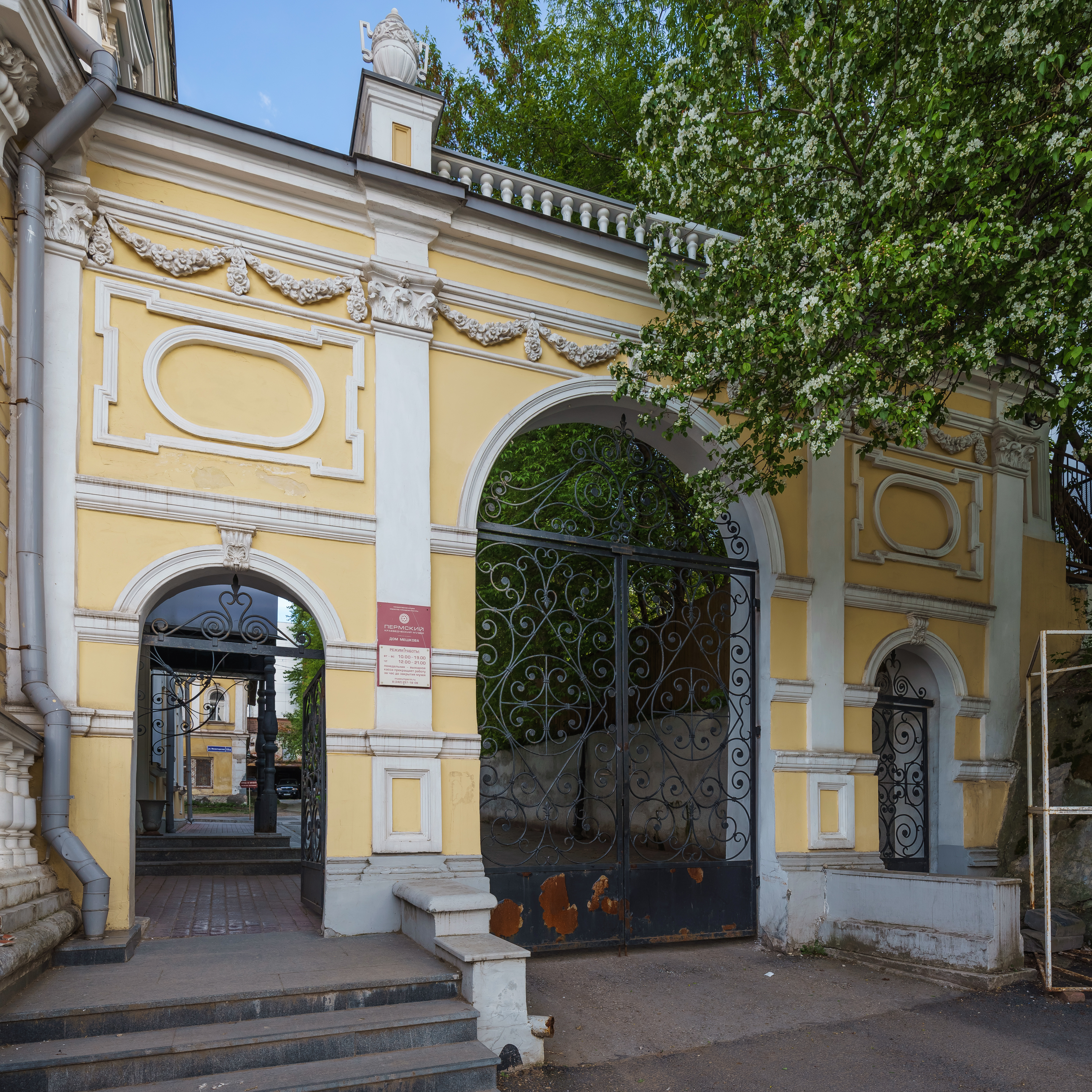
Gates

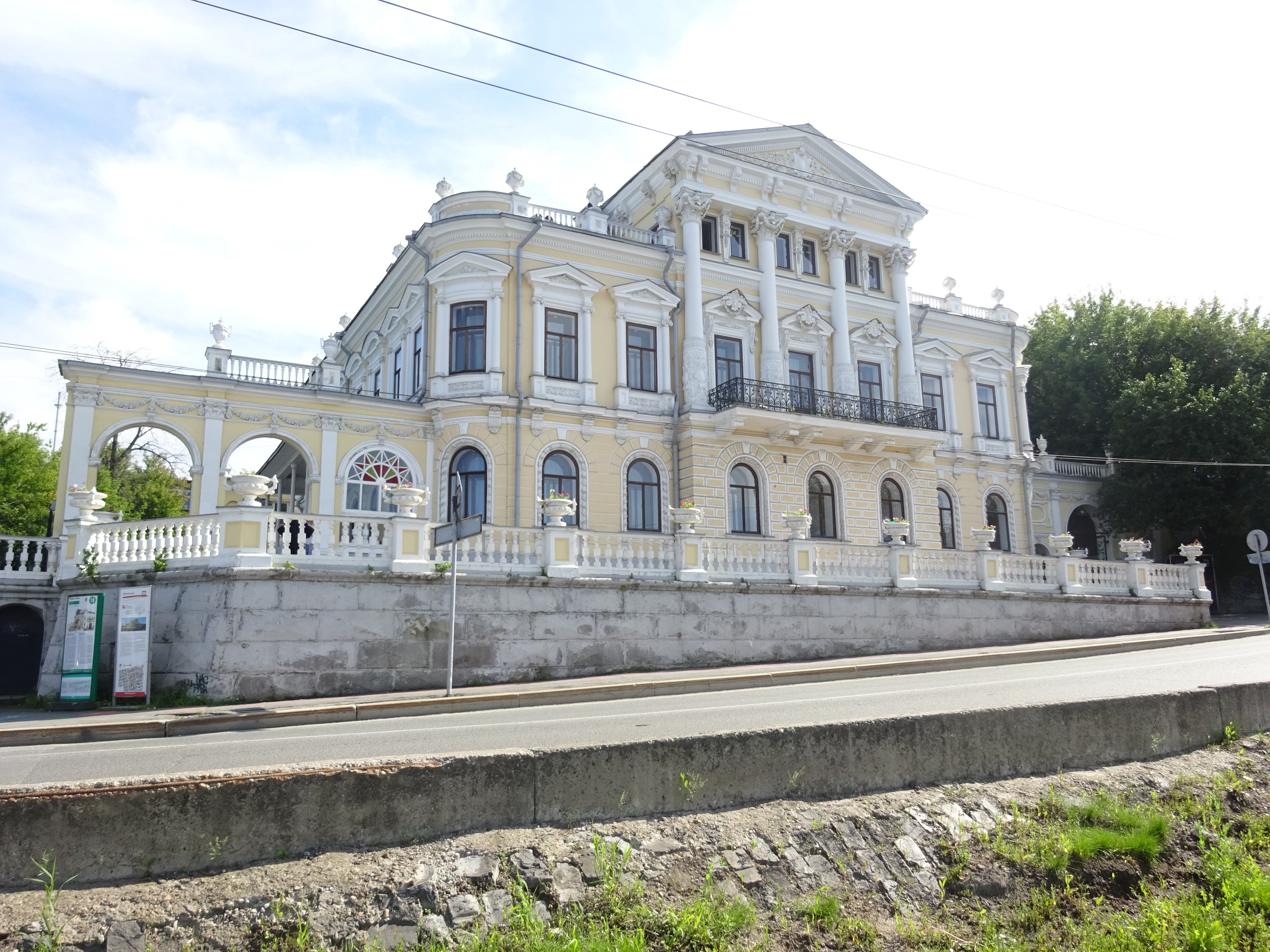
2019

== See also ==
- Perm Museum of Contemporary Art
