= Onésime Clerc =

Swiss-born Russian botanist (1845–1920)

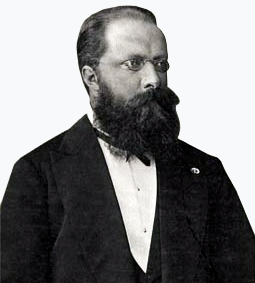
Onésime Clerc

Onésime Yegorowitsch Claire, also known as George Onésime Clerc (Russian: Онисим Егорович Клер, romanized: Onisim Yegorovich Kler; 25 February 1845 – 18 January 1920), was a Russian naturalist of Swiss origin.

== Life ==
Clerc was born in Corcelles, Switzerland, and graduated from the trade school in Neuchâtel. The family circumstances did not allow him to study at university.

In 1862, Clerc emigrated to the Russian Empire and became a French home teacher with the Trubetskoy family in Moscow. After taking an exam at the Saint Petersburg Imperial University, he was allowed to teach French at educational institutions. After three years in Moscow, he worked in Yaroslavl, where he participated in the work of the local scientific society.

In 1867, Clerc became a French teacher at the boys' high school in Yekaterinburg, which opened in 1861. He explored the nature and sights in the vicinity of Yekaterinburg. The director of the high school and his colleagues, as well as Narkiz Chupin, the director of the Yekaterinburg Mining School, supported him. Soon he founded the Ural Society of Natural Science Lovers, whose secretary and later president he remained until his death, and the UOLJ Museum, which opened at the end of 1870 and later became the local history museum of Sverdlovsk Oblast.

In 1870, Clerc married the daughter of a priest Nataliya Solotova, with whom he had four children. The eldest son Vladimir studied at the University of Geneva and became a biologist. The second son Modeste became a geologist. The third son Georgi became a zoologist. The youngest child Kristiana became a French teacher in Shadrinsk.

Clerc published geological and natural history works. He named botanical taxa. In the International Code of Nomenclature for algae, fungi, and plants, his name appears in the form Clerc. He was a member of more than 20 foreign and Russian scientific societies.

Clerc died on 18 January 1920 in Yekaterinburg.

== Legacy ==
The annual award for the best museum project in the Urals bears Clerc's name. In 2015, the first Clerc monument in Russia was erected at the entrance to the local history museum in Yekaterinburg.

== Honors ==
- Order of the Polar Star
- Ordre des Palmes Académiques

== Literature ==
- Pavel L. Gorchakovsky, Claude Favarger, Philippe Küpfer, Onésime Clerc (1845-1920), naturaliste: un neuchâtelois en Russie, in: Bulletin de la Société neuchâteloise des sciences naturelles, 118, 1995, p. 15-26. : ill (French).
- Rudolf Mumenthaler, Im Paradies der Gelehrten, 1996 (German).
