= Ural Society of Natural Science Lovers =

Russian organization

- Founded: 1870
- Founder: Onésime Clerc
- Dissolved: 1929
- Location: Yekaterinburg, Russian Empire
- Region served: Russian Empire (founding to 1918); Soviet Union
- Revenue: Membership fees

The Ural Society of Natural Science Lovers (abbreviated as UOLE or WOLE) was a Russian organization. Functioning from the mid-19th to early 20th centuries, the organization supported the study of the natural sciences and history of the Urals. Prior to its dissolution in 1929 the organization was joined by a number of notable Russian scientists, educators, and explorers.

== History ==
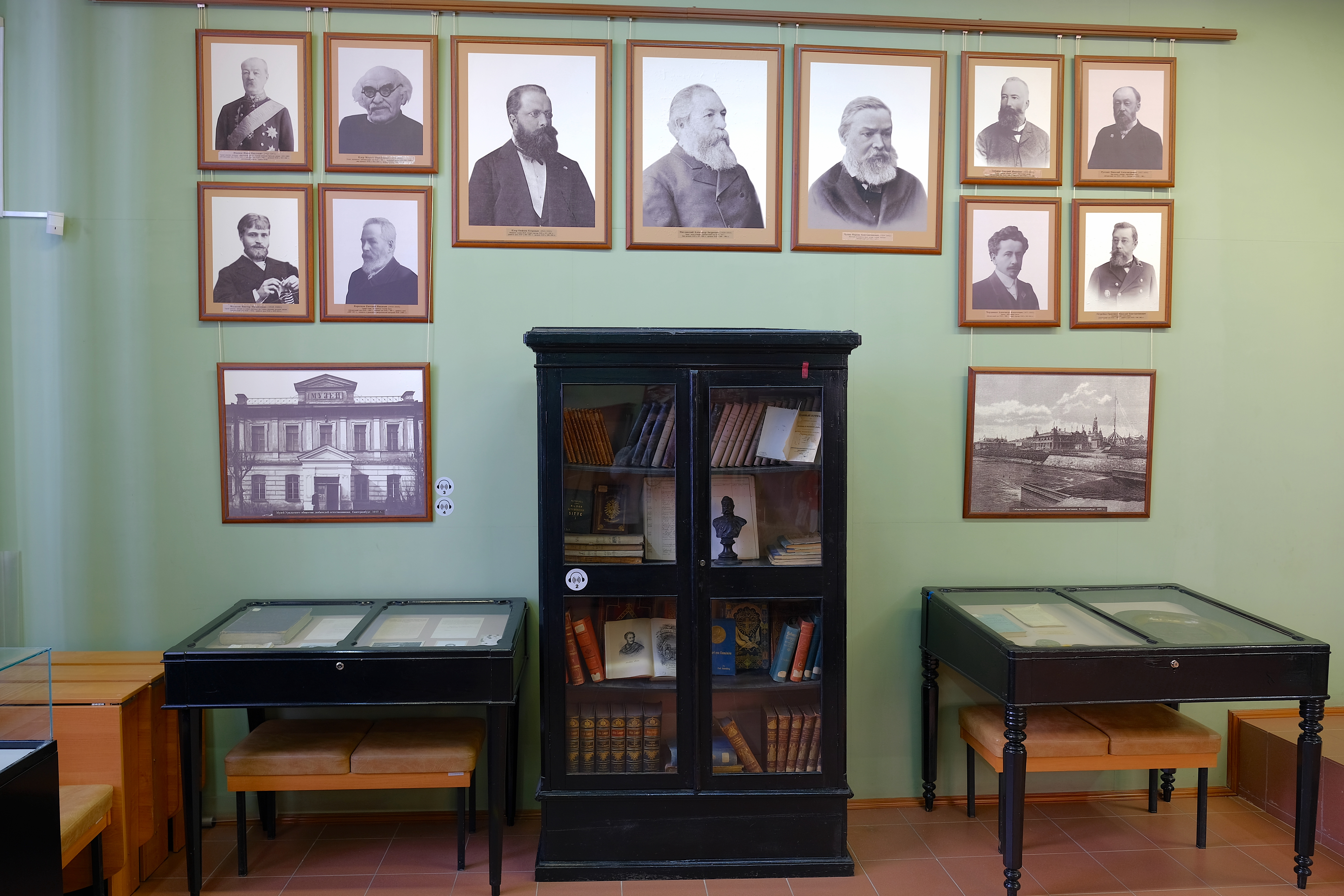
Portraits of the UOLE's founders on display at the Museum of History and Archeology of the Urals, also known as the UOLE museum

The Ural Society of Natural Science Lovers was founded in Yekaterinburg in 1870. At the time Yekaterinburg was a rapidly-growing center of industry and commerce, resulting in the rise of new class of wealthy businessmen. However, the region lacked any institutions of higher education. Seeking to rectify this, on 29 December 1870 a group of around 80 local notables held a meeting to form a private society to promote education, with this concept becoming the Ural Society of Natural Science Lovers. The driving force behind the formation of the society was Onésime Clerc, a Swiss-born teacher who had immigrated to Yekaterinburg and taken an interest in promoting the sciences. Clerc personally conducted research into the geology, metrology and herbology of the Urals, and these interests fit in with the purpose of the new organization. The UOLE was initially funded by membership fees.

Upon its founding the society was primarily concerned with the study of the natural history of the Ural region. However, as the society grew it began to branch out into new fields, such as meteorology and archeology. The UOLE continued to expand its membership in the 1870s and 80s, opened schools, and acquired artifacts. The collection of objects owned by the group continued to grow, especially after the society held a successful industrial exhibition in 1887 that netted the society many donations. In 1889 the society opened its first permanent exhibition, housing it in part of a local government building. The society also began to form chapters in other Russian cities; some of these chapters (like the society's Perm chapter, founded in 1890) would later go on to found their own museums.

From 1871 onwards, the UOLE operated a museum in Yekaterinburg. The museum's collection would be relocated several times and eventually became the modern day Sverdlovsk Regional Museum of Local Lore. The UOLE also published notes of its meetings from 1877 to 1927, some of which were translated into French and later English.

=== Decline ===
Following the Russian Revolution and subsequent formation of the Soviet Union, the UOLE was initially granted funding by the local Soviet administration. However, the society came under scrutiny from Soviet authorities; one source noted that the society was considered a potential stronghold of counter-revolutionary activity in Yekaterinburg. In the 1920s, several prominent members were arrested, property was seized from the UOLE, and the society was forcibly closed in 1929.
