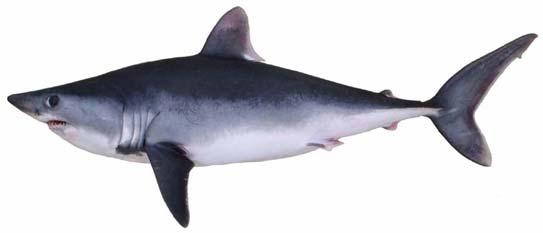

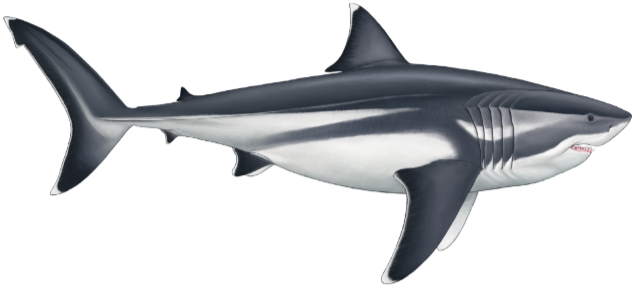
- Lamna nasus (top) and Otodus megalodon (bottom)

Scientific classification
- Kingdom: Animalia
- Phylum: Chordata
- Class: Chondrichthyes
- Subclass: Elasmobranchii
- Division: Selachii
- Order: Lamniformes
- Superfamily: Lamnoidea; Bonaparte, 1835

Families
- Lamnidae; †Otodontidae

= Lamnoidea =

Lamnoidea Temporal range: late Albian-present

Superfamily of sharks

Lamnoidea is a proposed superfamily of mackerel sharks, including families Lamnidae and Otodontidae. A number of characteristics, including regional endothermy, tooth morphology, and rostral cartilage morphology, have been suggested to support a sister group relationship between lamnids and otodontids. However, the hypothesis has been described as "unfounded" by K. Shimada, who suggests that there is "not even one decisive diagnostic character supporting the validity" of Lamnoidea, and that the relationship of otodontids to other members of Lamniformes remains uncertain.

== Phylogeny ==
Below is a cladogram showing the position of Lamnoidea within Lamniformes under the "Lamnoidea" hypothesis. The topology of extant families is based on Vella & Vella (2020), and the placements of Cretoxyrhinidae and Otodontidae are based on Ferrón (2017), Cooper (2020), and Greenfield (2022).

- Lamniformes
  - Mitsukurinidae
  - - - Alopiidae
      - - Odontaspididae
        - - Pseudocarchariidae
          - Megachasmidae
    - - Carchariidae
      - - Cetorhinidae
        - - †Cretoxyrhinidae?
          - Lamnoidea
            - †Otodontidae
            - Lamnidae
