= Paraptychodus =

Paraptychodus Temporal range: Albian

Scientific classification
- Kingdom: Animalia
- Phylum: Chordata
- Class: Chondrichthyes
- Subclass: Elasmobranchii
- Division: Selachii
- Order: Lamniformes
- Family: †Ptychodontidae
- Genus: †Paraptychodus; Hamm, 2015

Type species
- †Paraptychodus washitaensis Hamm, 2015

Extinct durophagous shark

Paraptychodus is a genus of extinct, durophagous shark that lived in North America during the Albian of the Early Cretaceous (ca. 100–105 Ma). It is notable for being the likely immediate evolutionary ancestor of the shark genus, Ptychodus. It is represented in the fossil record by one species, Pt. washitaensis.

== Phylogeny and evolution ==
Paraptychodus is the earliest known ptychodontid and likely immediate ancestor to Ptychodus. Based on complete body fossils from Mexico, Ptychodus has recently been classified as a lamniform, making Paraptychodus a lamniform as well.

The Albian record of Paraptychodus and early occurrences of Ptychodus in the Cenomanian suggest a North American origin for Ptychodus.

== Dentition ==
Like Ptychodus, Paraptychodus possessed a durophagous dentition. Its teeth have a convex crown surface crossed by transverse ridges. Although it differed from Ptychodus in having the labial protuberance and lingual sulcus featured in the tooth root and not the crown. And, Paraptychodus posterior teeth have a raised, pointed crown not observed in any Ptychodus species.

== Paleobiology ==
Paraptychodus inhabited the early Western Interior Seaway alongside a number of other shark genera such as Leptostyrax, Cretalamna, and Squalicorax. Given the size of their teeth, the largest being < 1 cm in size, it was likely a small shark (< 2 m). The depositional environment it was found in has been interpreted to be a shallow, near-shore shelf populated with numerous hard-bodied invertebrates. Researcher Shawn Hamm hypothesized Paraptychodus could have preyed upon small ammonoids.
