= Agua Nueva Formation =

Geologic formation from the Cretaceous period

- Stratigraphic range: Latest Cenomanian to Turonian
- Type: Formation

Lithology
- Primary: Limestone
- Other: Shale. bentonite, chert

Location
- Country: Mexico
- Extent: San Luis Potosí

The Agua Nueva Formation is a geologic formation in Mexico. It preserves fossils dated to the latest Cenomanian and Turonian ages of the Cretaceous period. It consists "predominantly of alternating fossiliferous, organic matter-rich, laminated, dark gray limestone and non-laminated, organic matter-poor limestone in decimeter-thick beds (10 to 30 cm) with occasional centimetric beds (5 cm) of brown shale that show no apparent internal structures." The formation is noted for its qualities as a Konservat-Lagerstätte, with notable finds including the plesiosaur Mauriciosaurus, the mosasaur Yaguarasaurus and sharks Ptychodus and Aquilolamna.

It appears to have been deposited on the upper part of a shallow continental shelf.

== Fossil content ==
Color key: Taxon / Reclassified taxon / Taxon falsely reported as present / Dubious taxon or junior synonym / Ichnotaxon / Ootaxon / Morphotaxon	Notes; Uncertain or tentative taxa are in small text; ~~crossed out~~ taxa are discredited.

=== Cartilaginous fish ===
Cartilaginous fish of the Agua Nueva Formation
Genus	Species	Location	Member	Material	Notes	Images
Aquilolamna	A. milarcae			Complete skeleton	A bizarre aquilolamnid shark.	
Lamniformes indet.				Articulated vertebrae	An indeterminate mackerel shark, potentially a cretoxyrhinid.	
Ptychodus	P. decurrens		Vallecillo	Teeth	A ptychodontid shark.	
Ptychodus	P. mortoni		Vallecillo	Teeth	A ptychodontid shark.	
Ptychodus	P. sp.		Vallecillo	Complete skeletons	A ptychodontid shark.	
cf. Scyliorhinus	S. sp.			Articulated vertebrae	A catshark.	

=== Ray-finned fish ===
Based on Amalfitano et al (2020):

Ray-finned fish of the Agua Nueva Formation
Genus	Species	Location	Member	Material	Notes	Images
Araripichthys	A. sp.				An araripichthyid.	Fossil specimen from an unknown location
Belonostomus	B. sp.				An aspidorhynchid.	Fossil specimen from Germany
Clupeoidei indet.			Huehuetla		A relative of herrings.	
Enchodus	E. sp.		Huehuetla		An enchodontid aulopiform.	
Goulmimichthys	G. roberti		Vallecillo, Huehuetla		A pachyrhizodontid crossognathiform.	Fossil specimen from Colombia
Hastichthys	H. sp.		Huehuetla		A dercetid aulopiform.	
"Nursallia"	"N." tethysensis		Huehuetla		A pycnodont.	Fossil specimen from an unknown location
Pachyrhizodus	P. caninus				A pachyrhizodontid crossognathiform.	
Paranursallia	P. gutturosa				A pycnodont.	Fossil specimen from an unknown location
Rhynchodercetis	R. regio				A dercetid aulopiform.	Fossil specimen from Lebanon
Tingitanichthys	T. sp.				A pachyrhizodontid crossognathiform.	
Tselfatia	T. formosa		Huehuetla		A plethodid tselfatiiform.	Fossil specimen from an unknown location
Vallecillichthys	V. multivertebratum		Vallecillo		A saurodontid ichthyodectiform.	

=== Lobe-finned fish ===
Lobe-finned fish of the Agua Nueva Formation
Genus	Species	Location	Member	Material	Notes	Images
Latimerioidei indet.				Gular plate	A large-sized marine coelacanth, potentially Megalocoelacanthus. Originally interpreted as a cephalopod gladius and given the name "Palaeoctopus pelagicus".	

=== Reptiles ===
==== Mosasaurs ====
Mosasaurs of the Agua Nueva Formation
Genus	Species	Location	Member	Material	Notes	Images
Yaguarasaurus	Y. regiomontanus				A plioplatecarpine mosasaur.	

==== Plesiosaurs ====
Plesiosaurs of the Agua Nueva Formation
Genus	Species	Location	Member	Material	Notes	Images
Mauriciosaurus	M. fernandezi				A polycotylid plesiosaur.	

=== Molluscs ===
==== Cephalopods ====
Cephalopods of the Agua Nueva Formation
Genus	Species	Location	Stratigraphic position	Material	Notes	Images

== See also ==
- List of fossiliferous stratigraphic units in Mexico
