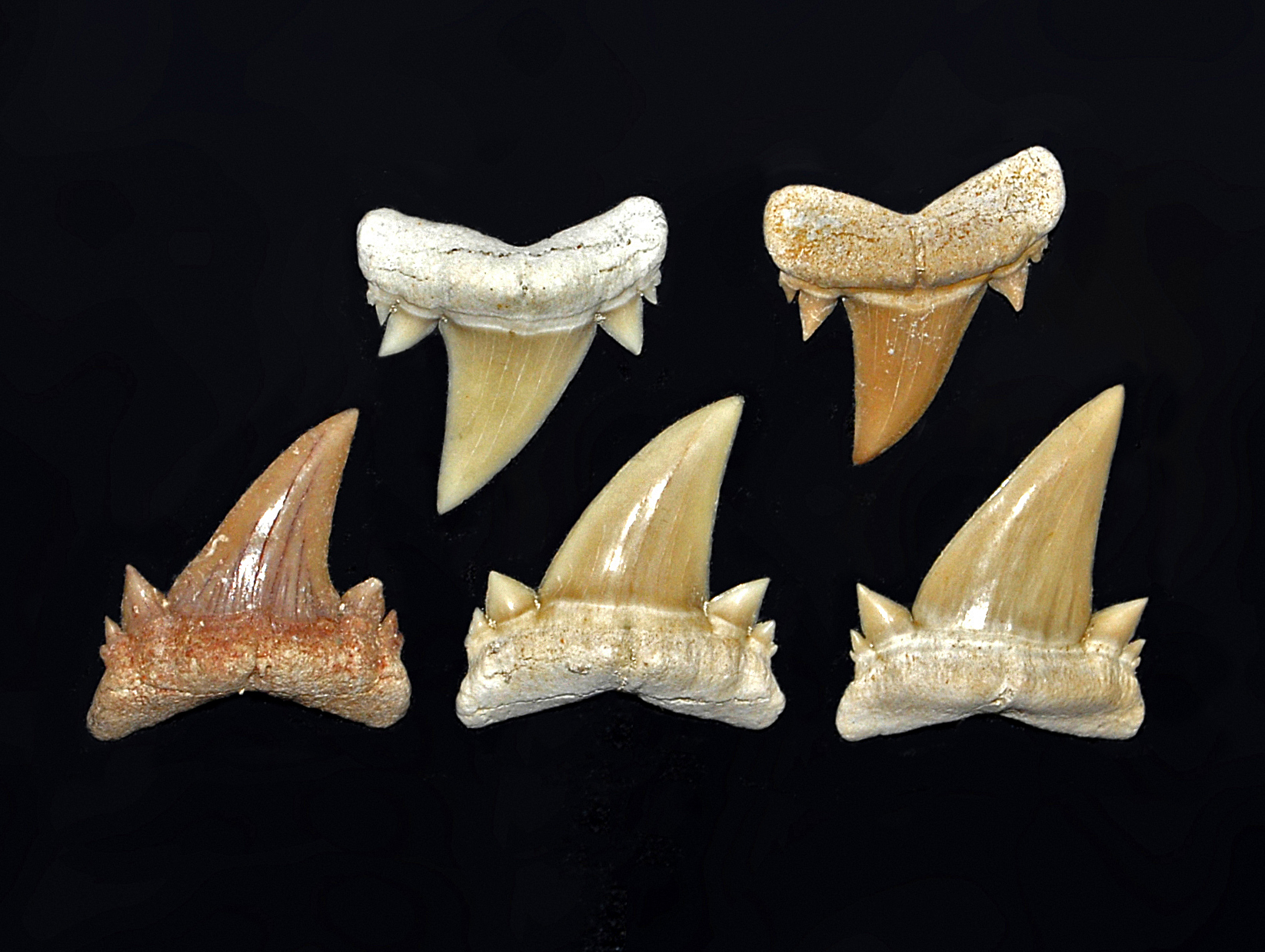
- Fossil teeth of Serratolamna gafsana from Khouribga (Morocco)

Scientific classification
- Kingdom: Animalia
- Phylum: Chordata
- Class: Chondrichthyes
- Subclass: Elasmobranchii
- Division: Selachii
- Order: Lamniformes
- Family: †Serratolamnidae
- Genus: †Serratolamna; Landemaine, 1991

Type species
- †Lamna serrata (Agassiz, 1843)

Species
- †S. serrata Agassiz, 1843; †S. khderii (Zalmout & Mustafa, 2001); †S. caraibea (Leriche, 1938); †S. africana Darteville & Casier, 1943; †S. maroccana? (Arambourg, 1935); †S. gafsana? (White,1926); †S. aschersoni (Stromer, 1905)

= Serratolamna =

Serratolamna Temporal range: Late Cretaceous–Paleocene

Extinct genus of sharks

Serratolamna is an extinct genus of mackerel sharks that is placed in the monotypic family Serratolamnidae.

== Description ==
The fossils of Serratolamna mainly consist of teeth and scattered vertebrae. The teeth are asymmetrical with smooth crowns and multiple cusplets. The basal margin of the roots are V-shaped. Based on the size of its teeth, it appears Serratolamna grew no larger than 1.5 metres.

== Distribution ==
Fossils of species within this genus have been found in Late Cretaceous of Cuba, France, Madagascar, Mexico, Morocco, Sweden and United States.

== See also ==
- Prehistoric fish
