= Protolamna =

Protolamna Temporal range: Valanginian-Maastrichtian ~140–70 Ma

Scientific classification
- Kingdom: Animalia
- Phylum: Chordata
- Class: Chondrichthyes
- Subclass: Elasmobranchii
- Division: Selachii
- Order: Lamniformes
- Family: †Pseudoscapanorhynchidae
- Genus: †Protolamna; Cappetta, 1985

Type species
- Protolamna sokolovi Cappetta 1980

Extinct genus of mackerel shark

Protolamna is an extinct genus of large mackerel shark from the Cretaceous Period. Protolamna fossils indicate gigantism evolved early on in the history of lamniforms.

== Fossil record ==
Protolamna is likely one of the most ancient lamniformes, known from as early as the Valanginian age of the Early Cretaceous (ca. 140 Ma). It appears to have had a cosmopolitan distribution throughout its geologic range, with fossils found on every continent except Antarctica.

== Paleobiology ==
Protolamna is known from isolated teeth, and a partial dentition associated with an articulated vertebral column. Despite having small teeth (typically about 2 cm in size), from these more substantial remains, researchers have estimated a total length greater than 6 meters (20 ft). This makes Protolamna the oldest-known gigantic lamniform.

From associated dermal denticles, researches have hypothesized that Protolamna was a pelagic-adapted predator that occupied near-shore environments. As a slow but active swimmer with a tearing type dentition, it likely preyed on bony fishes, small sharks, squids, and crustaceans in its environment.

== Species ==
Seven species are currently attributed to this genus, including the following:

- P. borodini (Maastrichtian, New Jersey)
- P. carteri (Cenomanian, Texas)
- P. compressidens (Turonian-Coniacian, Belgium, France, Texas)
- P. gigantea (Cenomanian, Minnesota)
- P. ricaurtei (Barremian-Aptian Paja Formation, Colombia)
- P. roanokeensis (Albian, Texas)
- P. sokolovi (Aptian-Albian, Russia)
