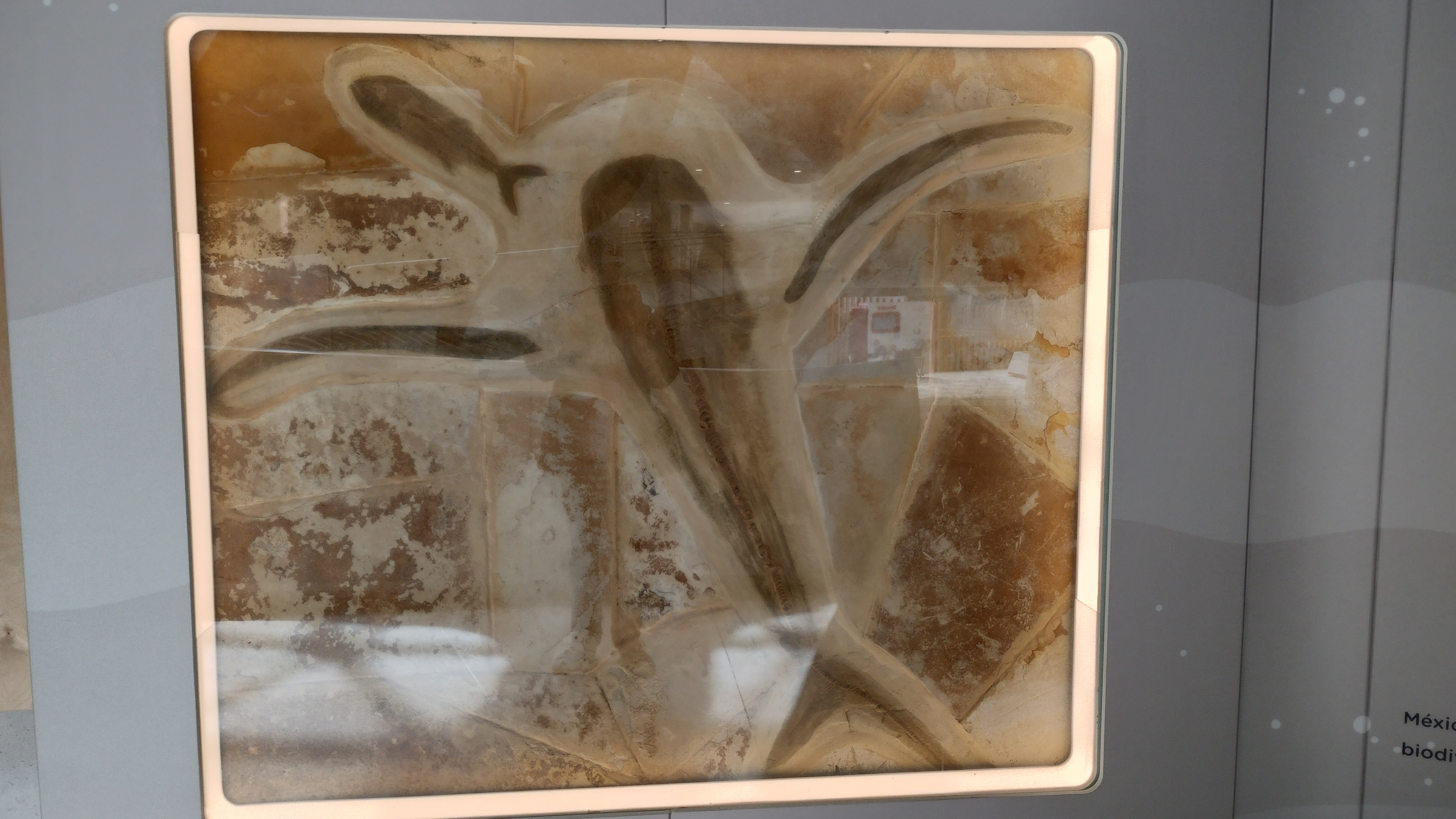
- Fossil cast in the Papalote Museo del Niño, in Monterrey.

Scientific classification
- Kingdom: Animalia
- Phylum: Chordata
- Class: Chondrichthyes
- Subclass: Elasmobranchii
- Division: Selachii
- Order: Lamniformes (?)
- Family: †Aquilolamnidae; Vullo et al., 2021
- Genus: †Aquilolamna; Vullo et al., 2021

Type species
- †Aquilolamna milarcae Vullo et al., 2021

= Aquilolamna =

Aquilolamna Temporal range: Late Cretaceous, 93 Ma

Genus of extinct elasmobranch from the Late Cretaceous period

Aquilolamna is an extinct genus of shark-like elasmobranch from the Late Cretaceous (Turonian)-aged Agua Nueva Formation of Mexico. It is currently known to contain only one species, A. milarcae, also known as the eagle shark, and it is classified in its own family Aquilolamnidae, which has been tentatively assigned to the mackerel sharks.

== Taxonomy ==
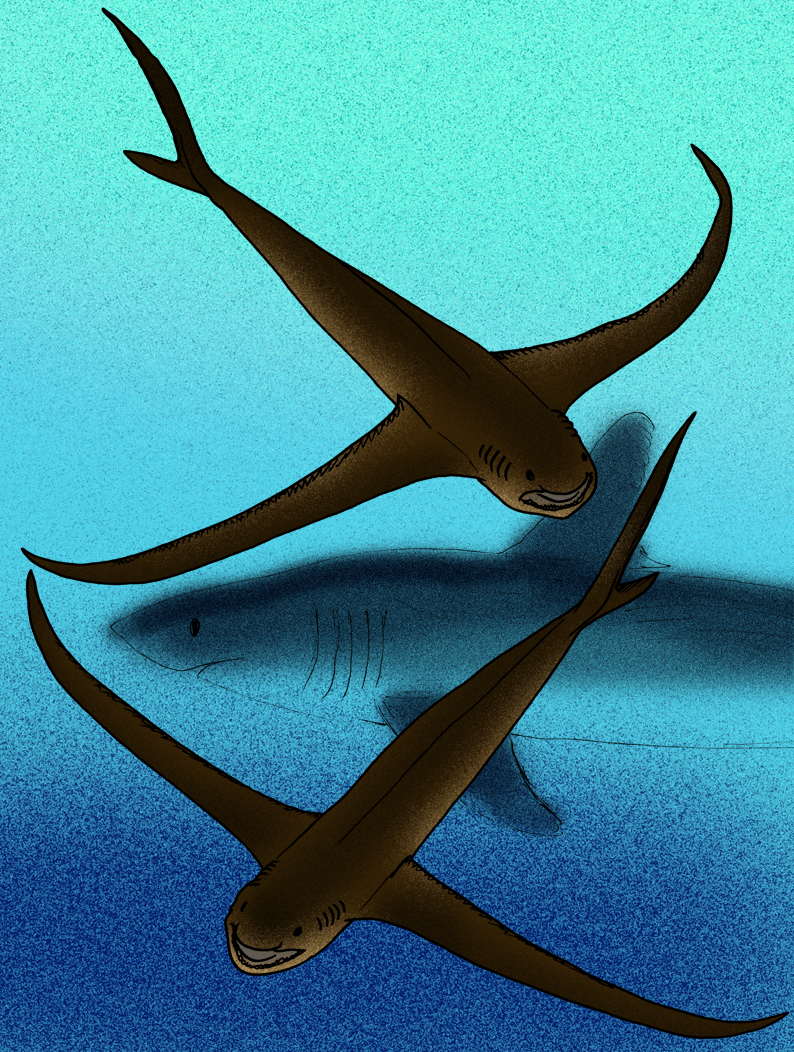
Life restoration.

While Aquilolamna is thought to be an elasmobranch, its taxonomy is disputed as, despite the holotype being a well-preserved body fossil, no teeth are known, which are important for determining the taxonomic affinities of fossil sharks; they are thought to have been dislodged when the individual died, although they could be preserved deeper in the matrix. Potential skin impressions preserved with the fossil could potentially be just fossilized bacterial mats. It was tentatively assigned to Lamniformes in its original description based on some morphological similarities to other members of the family. However, due to its extremely unusual features, other paleontologists have reservations about classifying it as such, and future research may be required. It has also been suspected that Aquilolamna may have been closely allied with Cretomanta, an extinct neoselachian of uncertain taxonomic affinity described in 1990 from teeth found in Texas (with further remains found in Canada and Colorado). Cretomanta lived around the same time as Aquilolamna and, given their possible similarities, both genera may belong to the same (unknown) family.

== Description ==
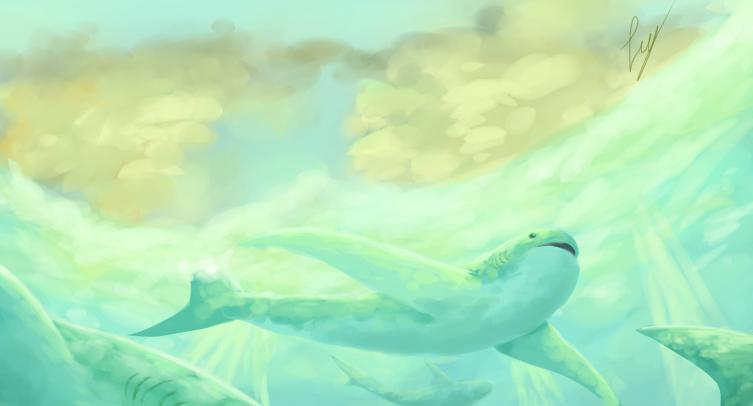
Life restoration

Aquilolamna displays an array of extremely unusual adaptations that make it unlike any living or extinct species of shark. It had a torpedo-shaped body and tail similar to that of most sharks, but also had a pair of extremely long, winglike pectoral fins whose width from tip to tip (1.90 meters) were wider than it was long (1.65 meters). These, combined with its broad head, have led to the hypothesis that Aquilolamna was a planktivorous filter-feeder, suggesting a form of convergent evolution with a manta ray-like body plan, which appeared millions of years later in the fossil record. Unlike manta rays, which "fly" through the water by flapping their fins, Aquilolamna may have instead steadily "glided" through the water with the help of its slender pectoral fins, and propelled itself with its tail.

== Discovery ==
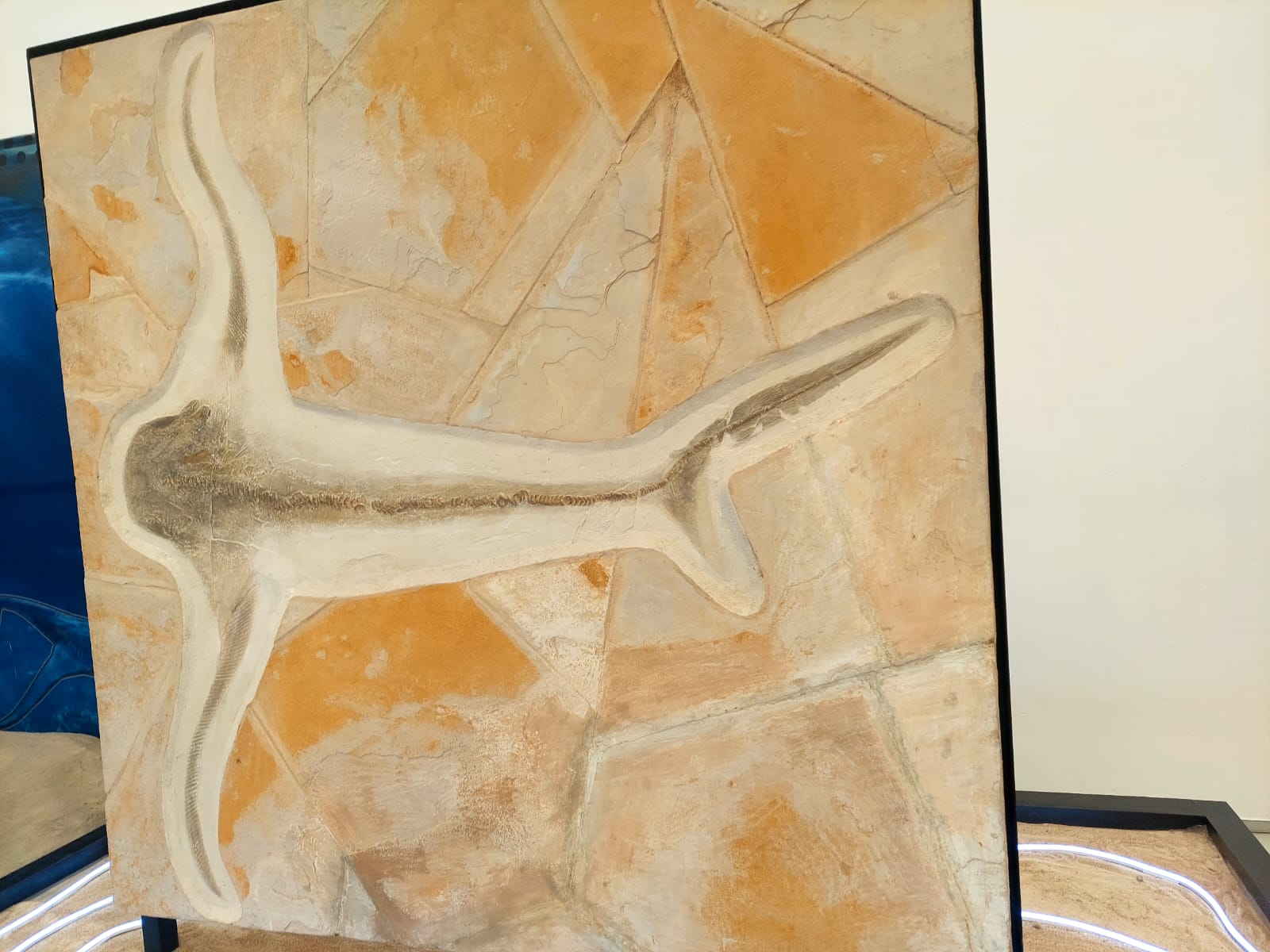
Fossil in Museo del Desierto

It was described from a single extremely well-preserved specimen, containing a fully-preserved skeleton and potential skin impressions, recovered in 2012 by an unknown quarry worker in Vallecillo in the Mexican state of Nuevo León. The specimen came to the attention of local teacher Margarito González González, who collected and prepared the specimen. Over the coming years, it received increasing attention at paleontological conferences, and was finally described in 2021. The paper describing the new species was problematic because the authors claimed the fossil was at a public museum, when in reality was part of the private collection of politician Mauricio Fernández Garza. The authors were also accused of scientific colonialism because they did not work with local paleontologists, as is mandated by the Instituto Nacional de Antropología e Historia, the national agency regulating paleontological research in Mexico.

== Paleoecology ==
Aquilolamna likely lived in a pelagic habitat during the Turonian period of the Late Cretaceous, about 93 million years ago. The formation it was found in, the Agua Nueva, is thought to be composed of sediments deposited in the outer part of a shallow continental shelf. It may have shared its habitat with marine reptiles, such as the polycotylid Mauriciosaurus, ammonites, and various bony fishes such as the ichthyodectiform Vallecillichthys and the crossognathiforms Goulmimichthys and Araripichthys. The top predator in the ecosystem was likely the large mackerel shark Cretoxyrhina. Aquilolamna's lineage may have gone extinct following a decline in plankton populations brought about by ocean acidification from the Cretaceous–Paleogene extinction event, with mobulid rays and other batoids later filling in the ecological niche left by its extinction.
