= Otodus hastalis =

Otodus hastalis Temporal range: Miocene

Scientific classification
- Domain: Eukaryota
- Kingdom: Animalia
- Phylum: Chordata
- Class: Chondrichthyes
- Subclass: Elasmobranchii
- Division: Selachii
- Order: Lamniformes
- Family: †Otodontidae
- Genus: †Otodus
- Species: †O. hastalis

Binomial name
- †Otodus hastalis (Lawley, 1876)

Synonyms
- Carcharocles hastalis (Lawley, 1876)

Extinct species of shark that lived in the Miocene

Otodus hastalis is an extinct dubious species of Lamniform shark what lived in the Miocene epoch, and was related to Megalodon.

== Description ==
Otodus hastalis is a dubious extinct species of mackerel shark, that lived during the Miocene epoch in Europe.
