= Cetorhinus huddlestoni =

Cetorhinus huddlestoni Temporal range: Middle Miocene

Scientific classification
- Kingdom: Animalia
- Phylum: Chordata
- Class: Chondrichthyes
- Subclass: Elasmobranchii
- Division: Selachii
- Order: Lamniformes
- Family: Cetorhinidae
- Genus: Cetorhinus
- Species: †C. huddlestoni

Binomial name
- †Cetorhinus huddlestoni Welton, 2013

Extinct species of shark

Cetorhinus huddlestoni is an extinct species of basking shark that lived in the Middle Miocene period. Its fossils consist of juvenile specimens, represented by fragmented and complete teeth. They are believed to be the same size as the current basking shark (Cetorhinus maximus). It was discovered in the Sharktooth Hill Bonebed of Kern County, California by Bruce Welton in 2013.

Fossils of other sharks such as Cetorhinus piersoni, Galeocerdo spp., Otodus subauriculatus, Otodus megalodon, and Carcharodon carcharias were found in the same place as Cetorhinus huddlestoni.

== Description ==
The teeth of C. huddlestoni are the same size as the ones found in adult basking shark, but are not as reduced.
