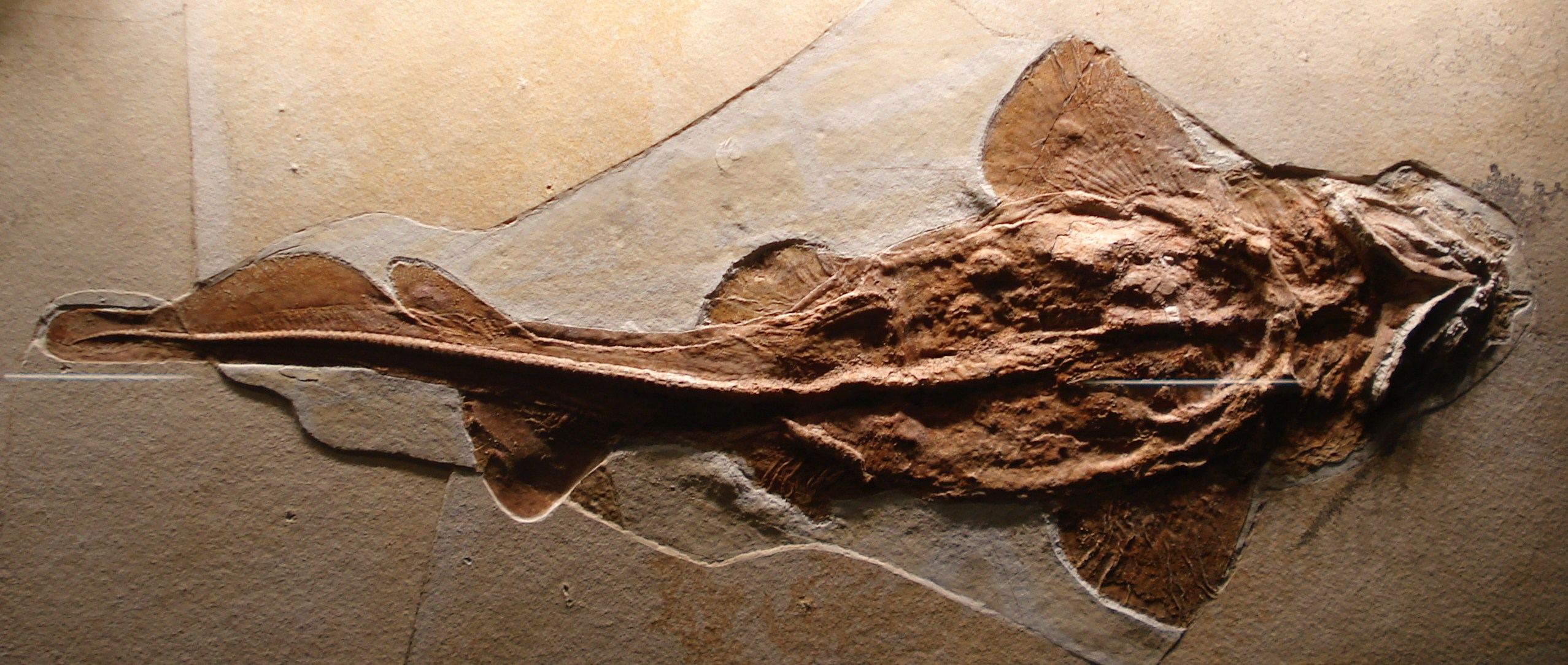

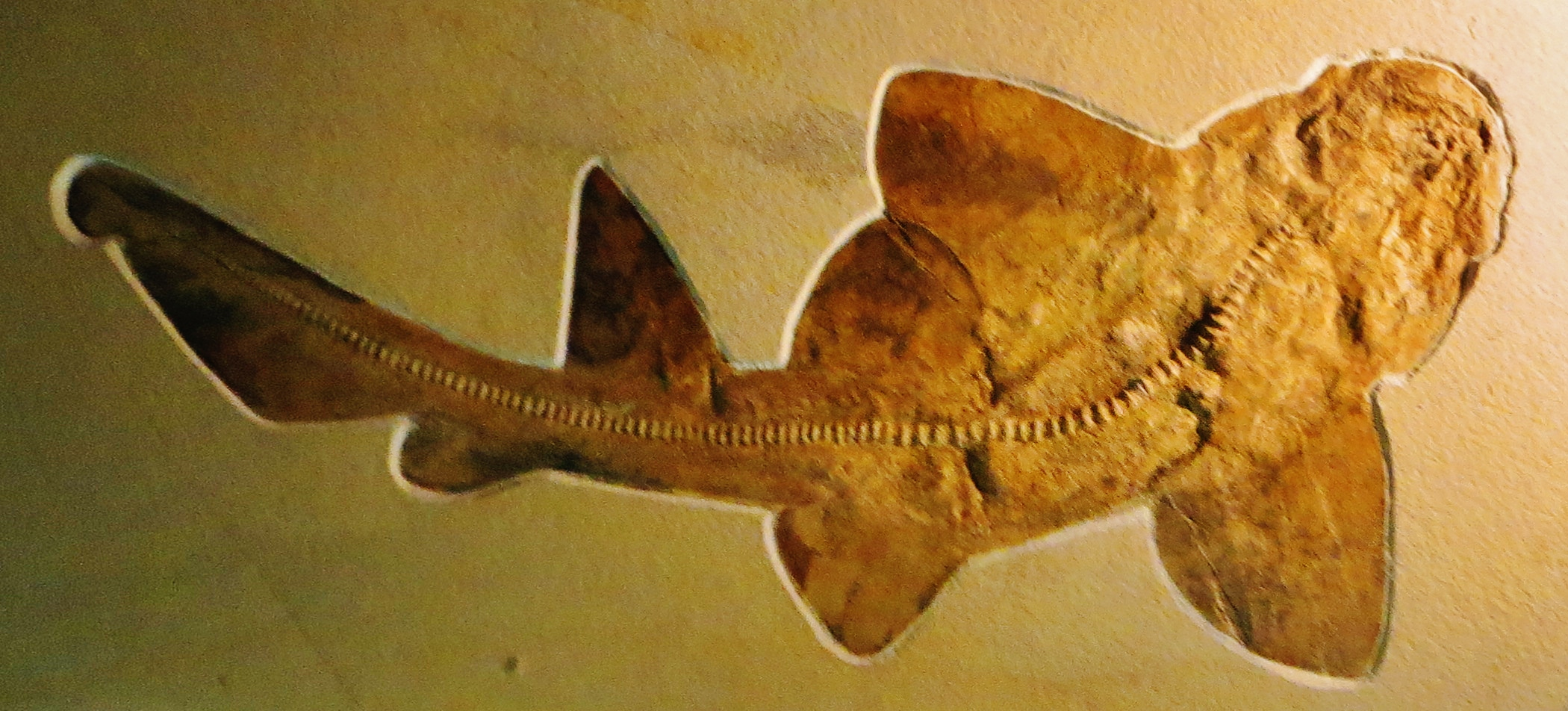
- Specimens of P. stromeri from the Upper Jurassic of Germany

Scientific classification
- Kingdom: Animalia
- Phylum: Chordata
- Class: Chondrichthyes
- Subclass: Elasmobranchii
- Division: Selachii
- Superorder: Galeomorphi
- Genus: †Palaeocarcharias; Beaumont, 1960
- Species: †P. stromeri

Binomial name
- †Palaeocarcharias stromeri Beaumont, 1960

= Palaeocarcharias =

Palaeocarcharias Temporal range: Middle-Late Jurassic Bathonian–Tithonian

Extinct genus of sharks

Palaeocarcharias is an extinct genus of shark, known from the Jurassic of Europe. It has only a single named species, Palaeocarcharias stromeri, which is known from exceptionally preserved specimens from the Late Jurassic (Tithonian) of Germany (Solnhofen Limestone) and France (Canjuers Lagerstatte). Isolated teeth of indeterminate species from England (White Limestone Formation, and possibly the Forest Marble and Taynton Limestone) extend the range of the genus back to the Middle Jurassic (Bathonian). Morphologically, it closely resembles carpet sharks (Orectolobiformes), and is around 1 metre (3.3 ft) in total body length. However, it shares greater similarities in tooth development with mackerel sharks (Lamniformes), including the absence of orthodentine, and has been suggested to the earliest known member of the Lamniformes or a member of a sister group to the Lamniformes. A 2018 study suggested that should be classified as the sole member of the order Palaeocarchariiformes, but a subsequent 2023 study questioned this and favoured placement in Lamniformes. A 2024 study of a specimen from Canjuers suggested that as that it was in fact a true carpet shark, perhaps a member of Orectolobidae (the wobbegongs).
