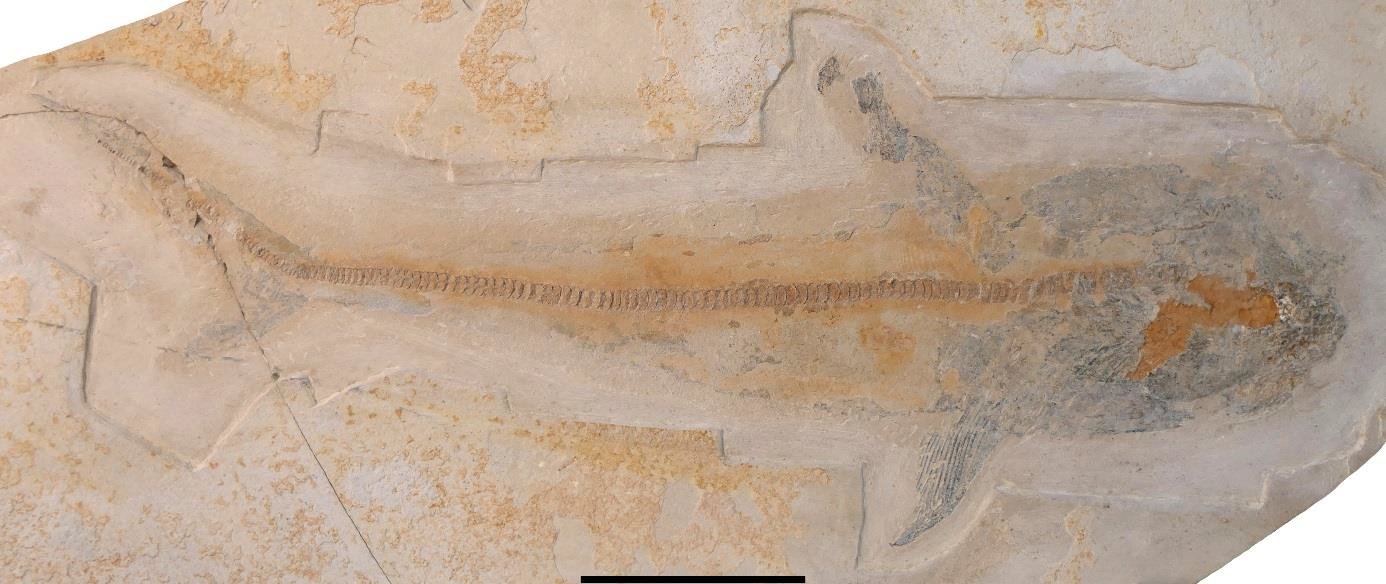
- Complete specimen of Ptychodus sp. (MMSP CPC 3064) from Agua Nueva Formation

Scientific classification
- Kingdom: Animalia
- Phylum: Chordata
- Class: Chondrichthyes
- Subclass: Elasmobranchii
- Division: Selachii
- Order: Lamniformes
- Family: †Ptychodontidae; Jaekel, 1898
- Genus: †Ptychodus; Agassiz, 1835

Type species
- Ptychodus latissimus Agassiz, 1835

Other species
- List: Ptychodus altior Agassiz, 1839; Ptychodus anonymus Williston, 1900; Ptychodus arcuatus Agassiz, 1837; Ptychodus articulatus Agassiz, 1837; Ptychodus atcoensis Carrillo-Briceno, 2013; Ptychodus belluccii Bonarelli, 1899; Ptychodus concentricus Agassiz, 1839; Ptychodus decurrens Agassiz, 1839; Ptychodus elevatus Leriche, 1929; Ptychodus gibberulus Agassiz, 1837; Ptychodus janewayii Cope, 1874; Ptychodus mahakalensis Chiplonkar and Ghare, 1977; Ptychodus mammillaris Agassiz, 1839; Ptychodus marginalis Agassiz, 1839; Ptychodus mortoni Agassiz, 1843; Ptychodus multistriatus Woodward, 1889; Ptychodus oweni Dixon, 1850; Ptychodus paucisulcatus Dixon, 1850; Ptychodus polygyrus Agassiz, 1839; Ptychodus rugosus Dixon, 1850; Ptychodus spectabili Agassiz, 1837; Ptychodus whipplei Marcou, 1858

= Ptychodus =

Ptychodus Temporal range: Late Cretaceous 100.5–75 Ma

Extinct genus of sharks

Ptychodus (from Greek: πτυχή ptyche 'fold' and Greek: ὀδούς odoús 'tooth') is a genus of extinct durophagous (shell-crushing) lamniform sharks from the Cretaceous period, spanning from the Cenomanian to the Campanian. Fossils of Ptychodus teeth are found in many Late Cretaceous marine sediments worldwide.

At least 16 species are considered valid, with the largest members of the genus suggested to have grown up to 10 meters (33 feet) long, and the smallest about 2 meters (6.6 feet). The youngest remains date to around 75 million years ago. A large number of remains have been found in the former Western Interior Seaway.

== Discovery ==
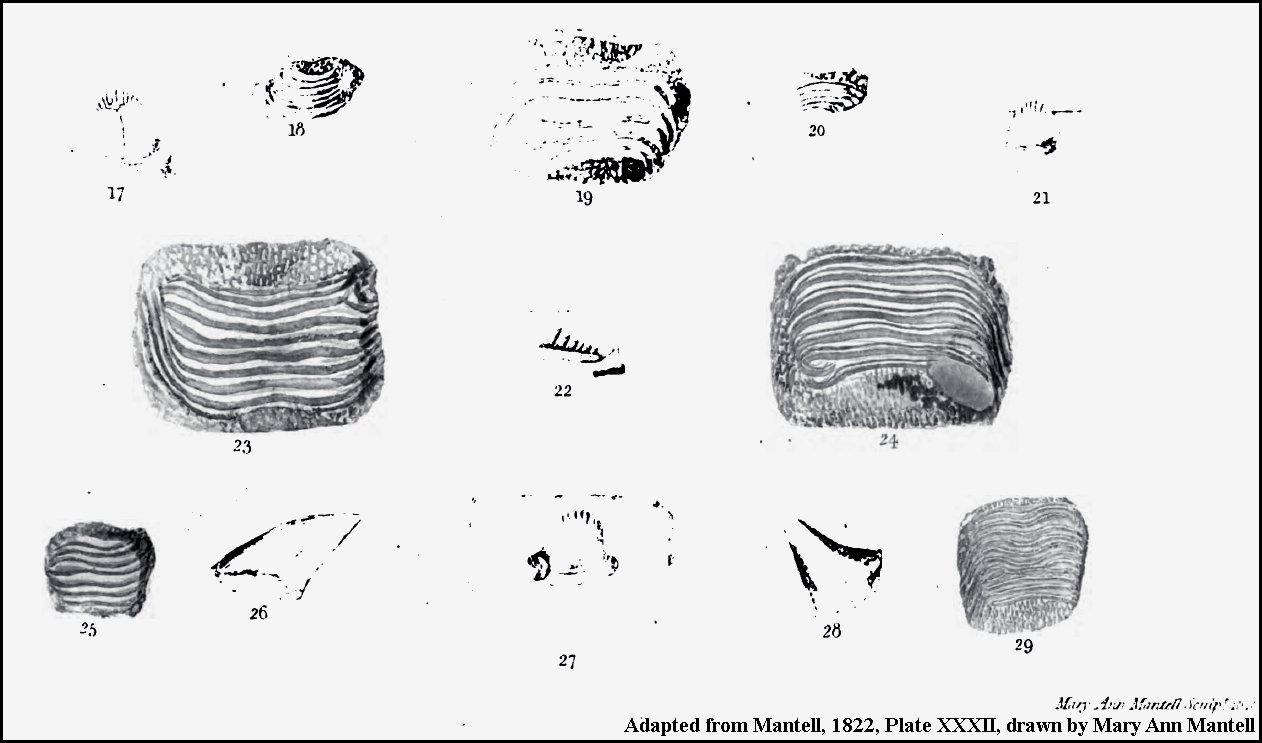
1822 illustration of the first Ptychodus teeth.

Due to a global distribution Ptychodus is well represented in the fossil record; many fossils have been uncovered such as isolated teeth, fragments of dentition, calcified vertebral centra, denticles, and associated fragments of calcified cartilage. The very first remains of Ptychodus were found in England and Germany in the first half of the 18th century. Ptychodus teeth have long been identified as palates of diodon, or porcupinefish (Osteichthyes, Diodontidae), well-known for their ability to inflate their bodies in defense. At the beginning of the 19th century, several authors including Swiss paleontologist Louis Agassiz eventually demonstrated the affinities of Ptychodus teeth with those of elasmobranchs (rays and sharks). The first discovery of Ptychodus teeth in Kansas came in 1868 when Leidy reported and described a damaged tooth near Fort Hays, Kansas. After, many more teeth were uncovered in almost perfect conditions and other species within the genus were identified.

Fossils of species within this genus have been found in the marine strata of United States, Brazil, Canada, the Czech Republic, France, Germany, India, Israel, Japan, Jordan, Mexico, Sweden, and the United Kingdom. This rich fossil record of Ptychodus indicates the genus existed from the Cenomanian through the Campanian.

The generic name Ptychodus comes from the Greek words ptychos (fold/layer) and odon (tooth), so "fold teeth" describing the shape of their crushing and grinding teeth.

== Taxonomy and Evolution ==
While the affinity of Ptychodus as some kind of cartilaginous fish has long been accepted, the exact position in the group was long uncertain. A 2016 publication found that Ptychodus are likely true sharks belonging to Selachimorpha, rather than hybodonts or batoids as previously thought. A 2024 study of a complete skeleton concluded that they belong to the Lamniformes (mackerel sharks).

The earliest records of Ptychodus proper occur in the Cenomanian of the Late Cretaceous with P. anonymus. However, earlier forms similar to Ptychodus appeared in the Albian, including the likely immediate ancestor to Ptychodus, Paraptychodus. These records of early Ptychodus and ancestral forms suggest Ptychodus originated in the Western Interior Seaway, and then propagated through Cretaceous seas across the globe.

== Description ==
=== Size ===
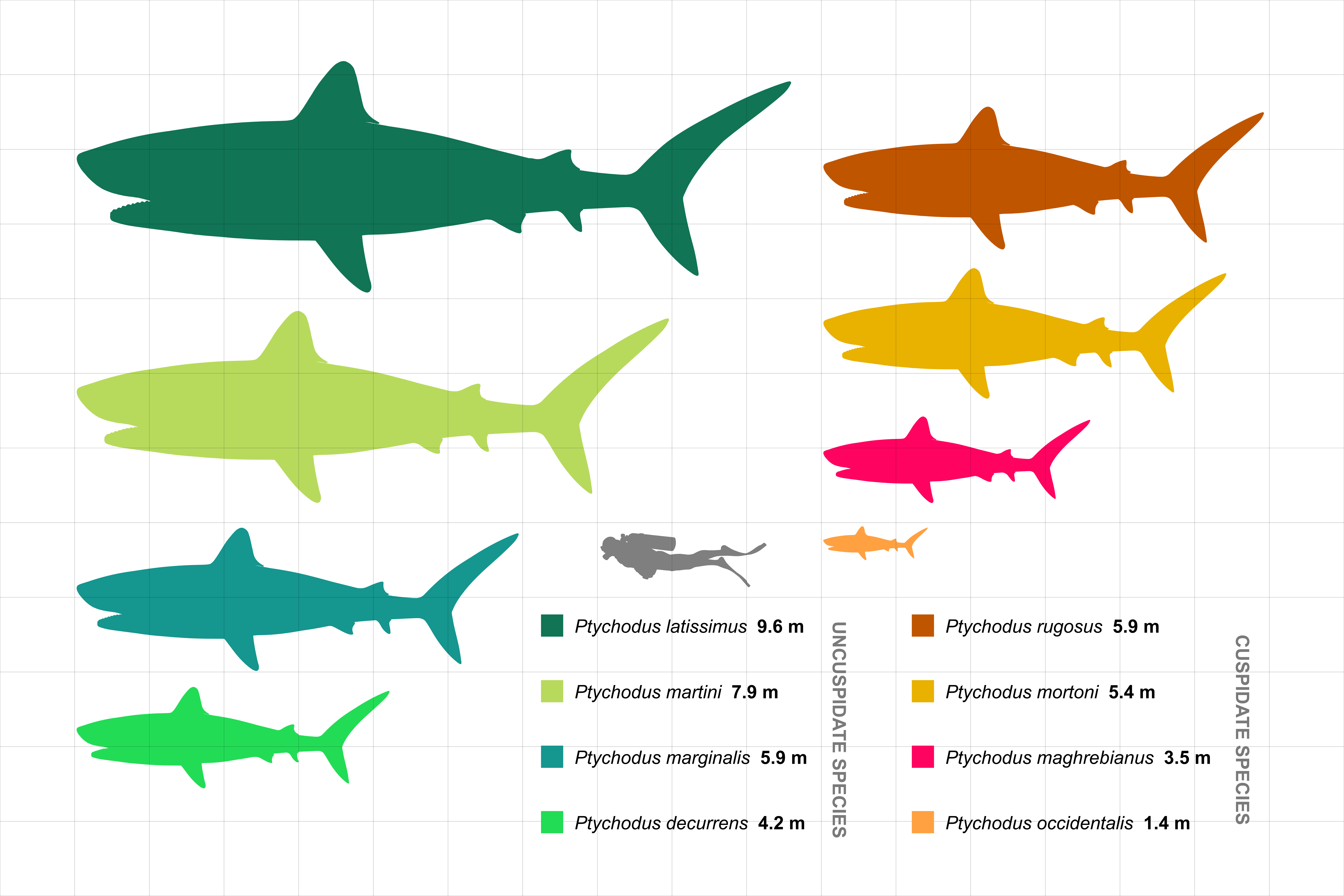
Size estimates of several Ptychodus species compared to a 1.8 m (5.9 ft) tall human

Ptychodus was a diverse genus with many species that varied in size. Some species like P. mortoni could grow to large sizes, with estimates placing it at 10 meters (33 feet) in total length based on extrapolations from tooth size. Large vertebrae referred to Ptychodus hint that other species could reach a similar size. The smallest species of Ptychodus like P. occidentalis were likely only about 2 meters (6.6 feet) in total length.

=== Dentition ===
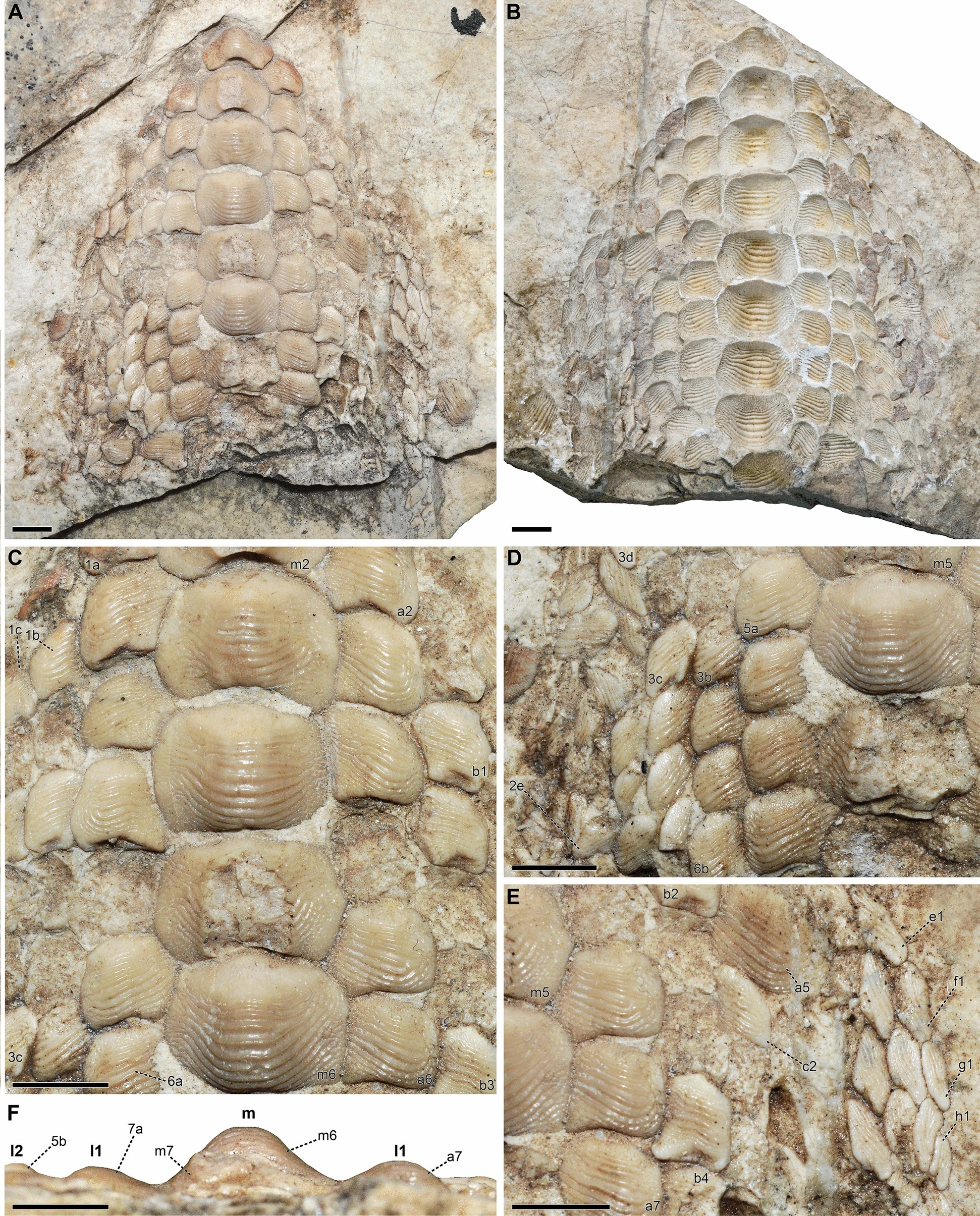
Largely complete and articulated lower jaw tooth plate of Ptychodus decurrens from Croatia

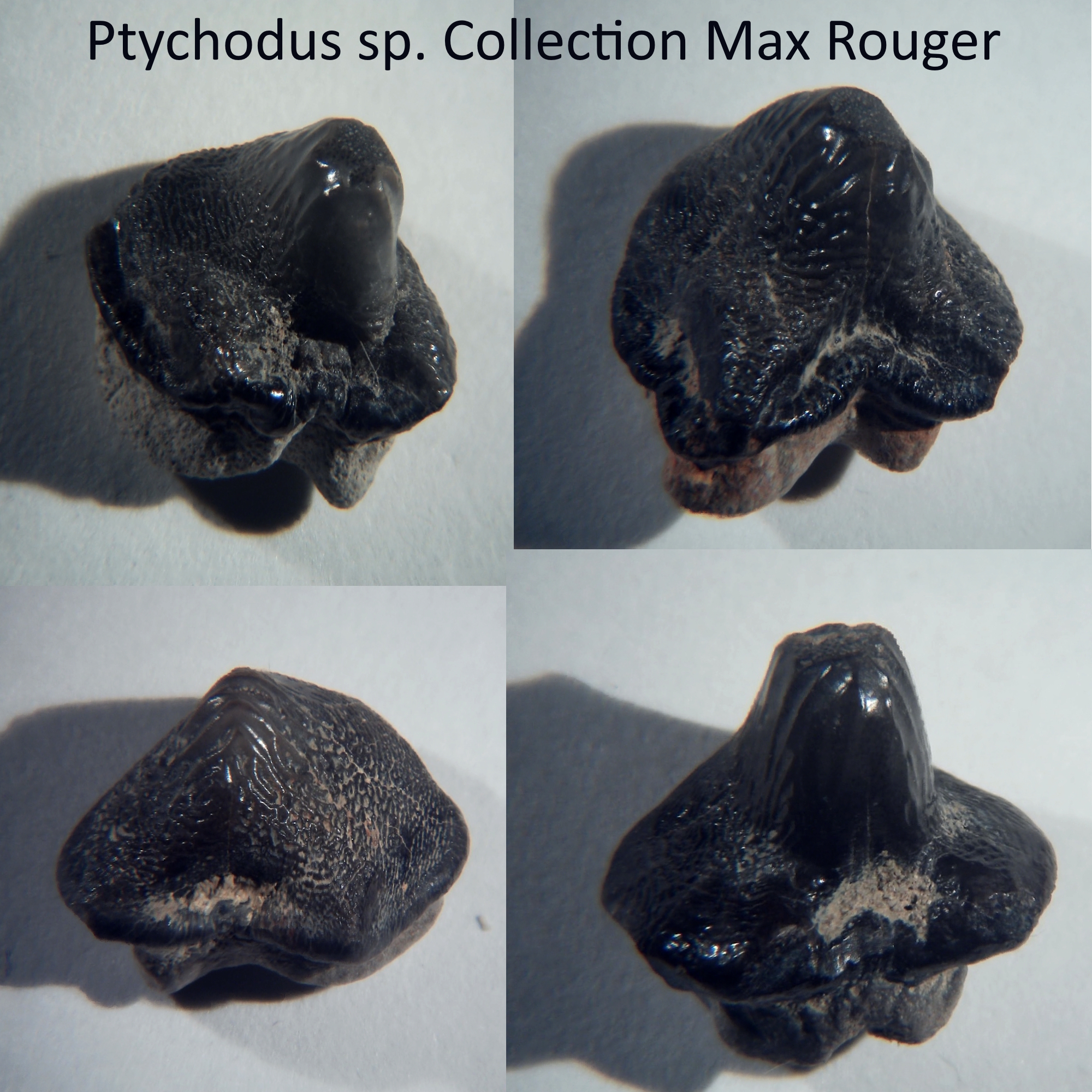
Psychodus sp. teeth. from the Cenomanian – Turonian Eagle Ford Group near Dallas, Texas

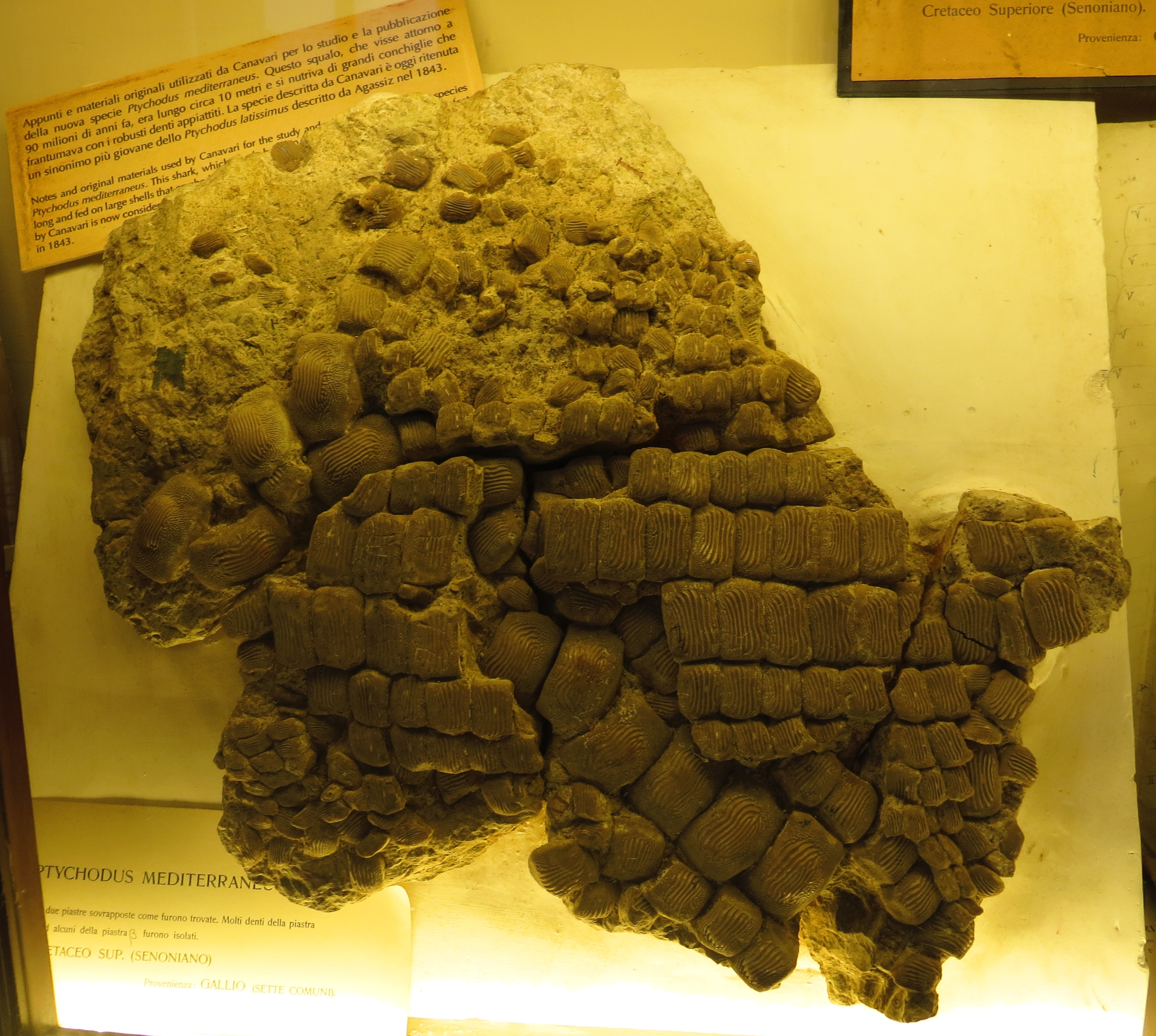
Partially articulated tooth battery

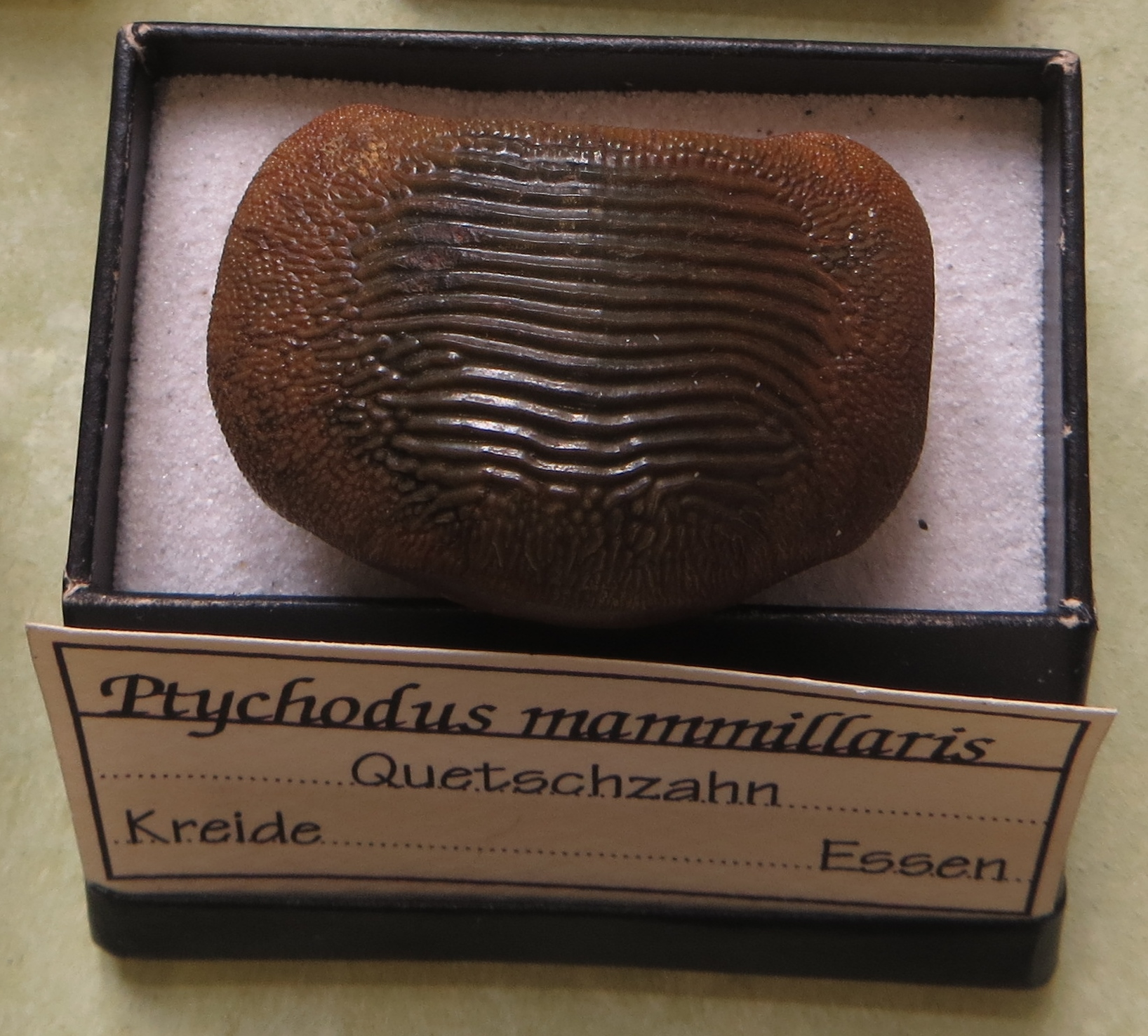
Tooth of Ptychodus mammillaris

Unlike the colossal nektonic planktivores Rhincodon (whale sharks) and Cetorhinus (basking sharks) which rely upon gill rakers to acquire their food, the Ptychodus had a massive arrangement of crushing plate teeth. A Ptychodus jaw contains many teeth, up to 550 teeth, 220 of which are on the lower jaw and 260 in the upper jaw. These teeth were very large as well—Paleontologists believe that the largest tooth plate measured 55 centimeters in length and 45 centimeters in width. There are two distinct formations of tooth plates between the genus; one being juxtaposed, non-overlapping tooth rows, and another being imbricated tooth rows.

It is believed that the shape coincides with the diet of the species and their geographic locations, but the time it lived has a big part as well. Ptychodus marginalis teeth differ from Ptychodus polygyrus. P marginalis was in the Middle Cenomanian to Middle Turonian deposits in the English Chalk, while P. polygyrus was in the Late Santonian-Early Campanian deposits.

=== Body ===
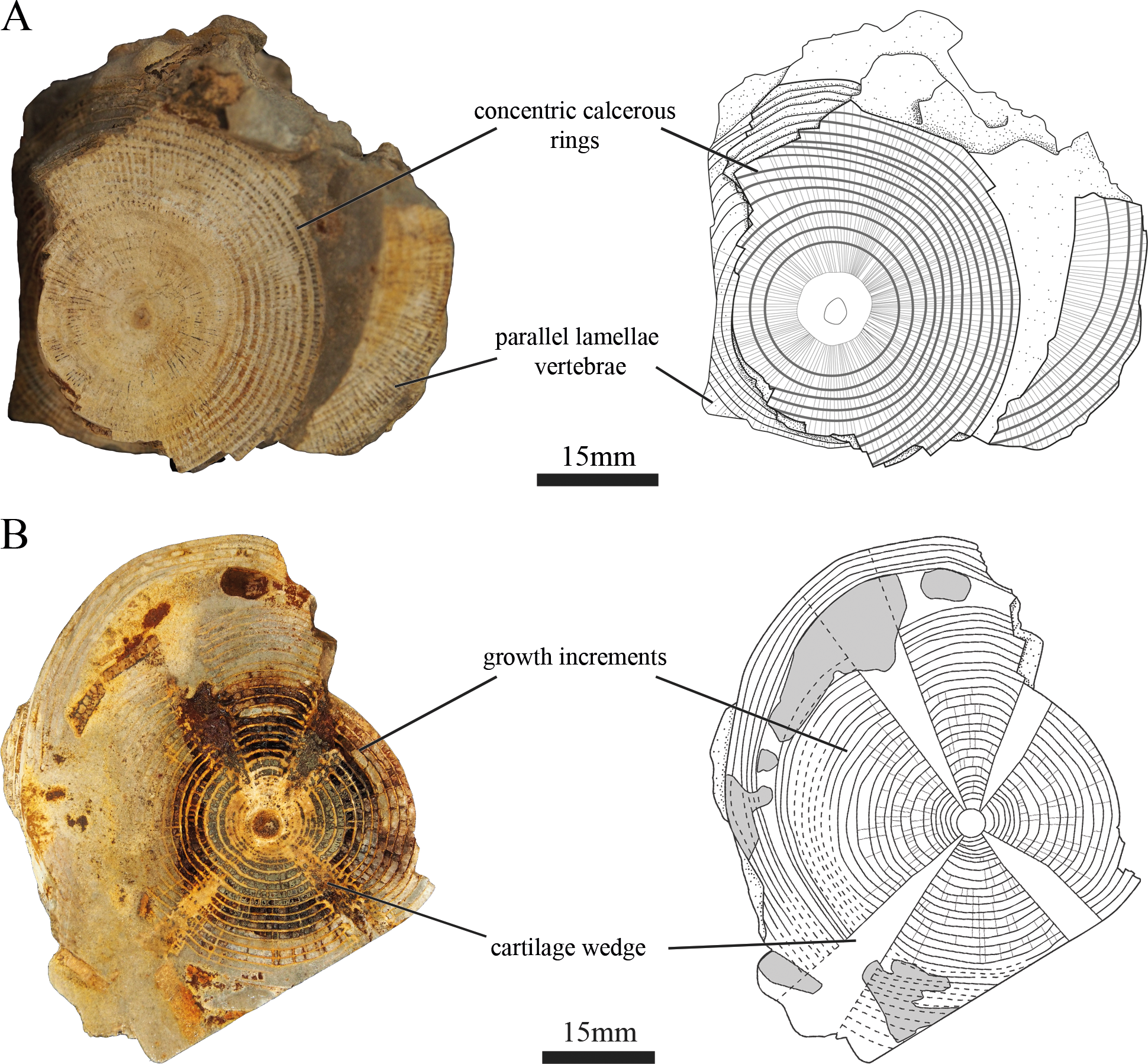
Vertebral centra of Ptychodus sp. EMRG-Chond-SK-1

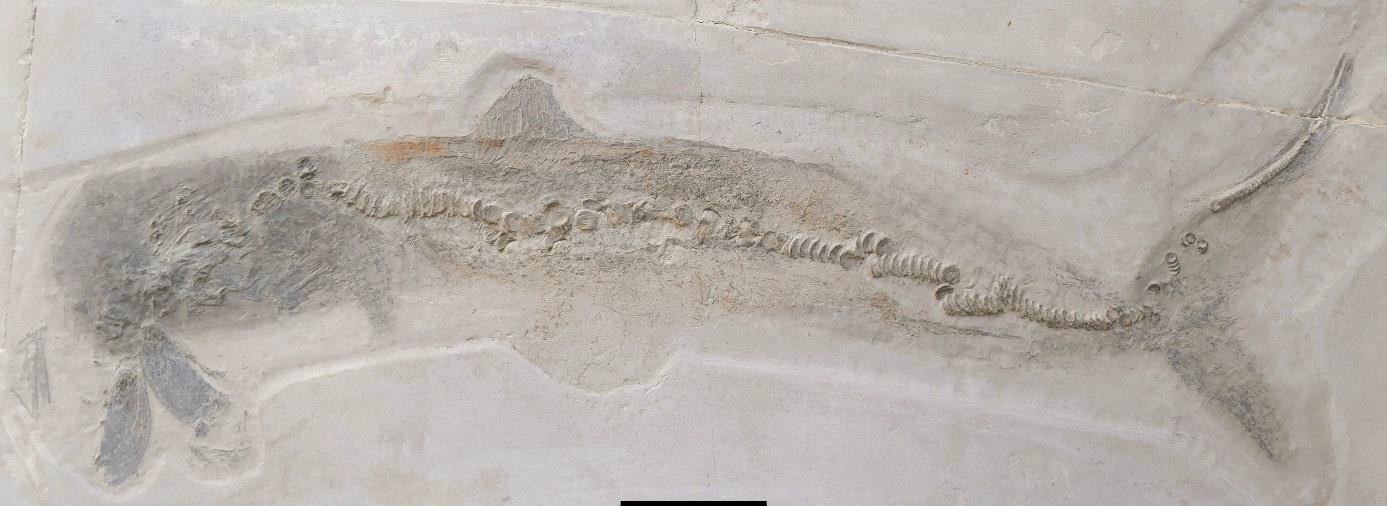
Ptychodus sp. MMSP CPC 3067

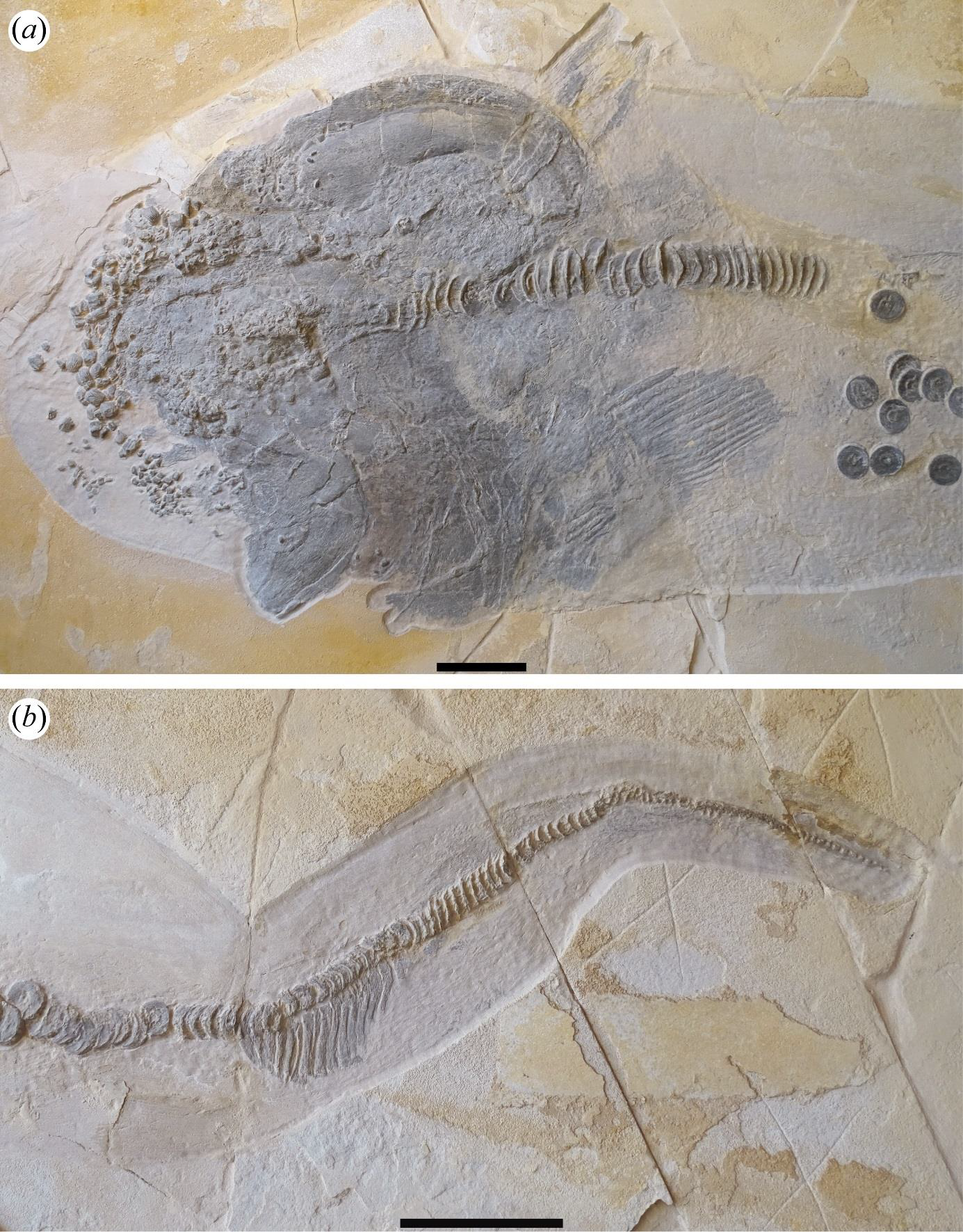
(a) head and (b) tail of Ptychodus sp. MMSP CPC 3068

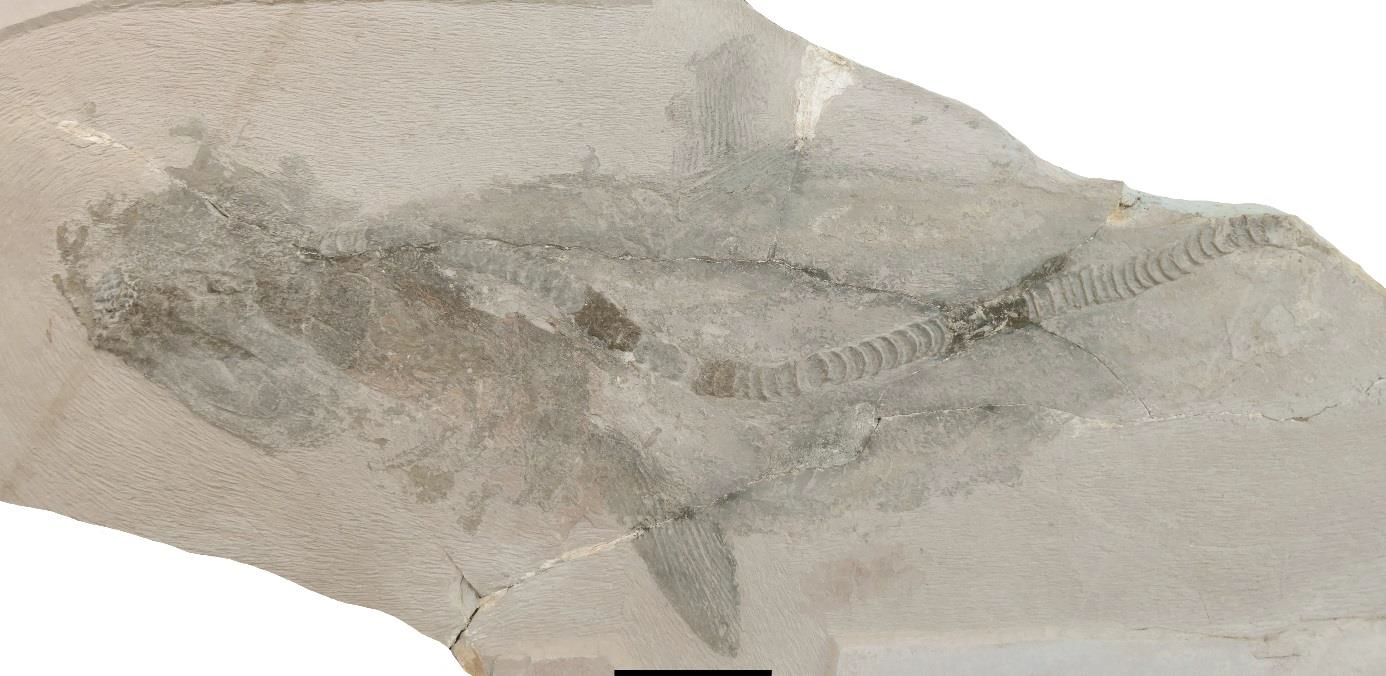
Ptychodus sp. MMSP CPC 3066

The only known complete body remains are from the Agua Nueva Formation in Mexico, which suggest that Ptychodus had a fusiform body, with a large and elongate head, the primarily dorsal fin was large and placed forward on the body while the second posterior dorsal fin was much smaller, with a small anal fin being present. The overall body form closely resembles that of the great white shark and Lamna (which includes the porbeagle and salmon shark).

== Paleobiology ==
Life restoration

Based on analysis of vertebrae from Spain, it is suggested that species of Ptychodus lived relatively long lives and were slow growing and produced large offspring and small litters.

=== Diet ===
Ptychodus is thought to have been durophagous, using its low rounded teeth to crush hard-shelled organisms (such as ammonites, bivalves, belemnites, echinoderms, and brachiopods). Many authors have suggested that Ptychodus fed on bottom dwelling (benthic) prey like bivalves (particularly inoceramids) and crustaceans, while also consuming some hard bodied organisms that lived in open water (pelagic). A 2024 study suggested that based on its body morphology, the species likely primarily consumed pelagic hard prey, like ammonites and marine turtles, rather than benthic prey.

=== Extinction ===
It is suspected that Ptychodus went extinct during the Campanian due to increased competition with shell crushing mosasaurs in the groups Globidensini and Prognathodontini.
