= Megaselachus =

Megaselachus Temporal range: Early Miocene

Scientific classification
- Kingdom: Animalia
- Phylum: Chordata
- Class: Chondrichthyes
- Subclass: Elasmobranchii
- Division: Selachii
- Order: Lamniformes
- Family: †Otodontidae
- Genus: †Megaselachus; Glyckman, 1964

Type species
- †Carcharias subauriculatus (Agassiz, 1839)

Other species
- †?M. productus (Agassiz, 1838)

Synonyms
- Carcharias subauriculatus (Agassiz, 1839); Megaselachus polygorus? (Glickman, 1964); Carcharodon subauriculatus (Agassiz, 1843)

Extinct shark from the Miocene

Megaselachus is a possibly dubious extinct genus of otodontid shark. In the past, this particular genus has been used to house other otodontids, such as the famous megalodon. It is sometimes considered a subgenus of Otodus, or merged with other related genera such as Carcharocles. The genus lived during the Miocene. Only a single species can be confidentially placed in the genus, Megaselachus subauriculatus. An additional species, M. productus is now considered a possible synonym of Otodus megalodon.

== Taxonomy ==
The Megaselachus is now considered a dubious name and problematic name. The holotype of M. subauriculatus is the MLP 12-3724, that was named in 1839 by Louis Agassiz as Carcharias subauriculatus. In 1843, Louis Agassiz realized that the teeth of this species were more similar to those of the Great White Shark (Carcharodon carcharias), than to the genus Carcharias as previously thought. He recombined as junior synonym of Carcharodon subauriculatus (now O. chubutensis) previously in same year.

In 1964, the paleontologist Glickman suggested a separate genus, the Megaselachus and include M. subauriculatus, M. megalodon and M. chubutensis in same genus. The M. productus was proposed in 1838, and previously supported now as a synonym of O. megalodon or O. chubutensis, but are in debate. New studies previously in 2000s, paleontologists started began to question the validity of this genus, assuming that the genus had no characteristics of its own that separated it from Otodus and Carcharocles.

== Description ==
Megaselachus teeth are moderately narrow. They also have a heavily serrated crown. The labial side is convex with a prominent triangular neck, while the lingual side is concave.
