= Truyolsodontos =

Truyolsodontos Temporal range: Cenomanian-Coniacian

Scientific classification
- Domain: Eukaryota
- Kingdom: Animalia
- Phylum: Chordata
- Class: Chondrichthyes
- Subclass: Elasmobranchii
- Division: Selachii
- Order: Lamniformes
- Family: †Truyolsodontidae; Bernárdez, 2018
- Genus: †Truyolsodontos; Bernárdez, 2018

Type species
- †Truyolsodontos estauni Bernárdez, 2018

Other species
- †Truyolsodontos magnus (Landemaine, 1991)

Synonyms
- Species synonymy: T. magnus; Protoscyliorhinus magnus Landemaine, 1991

Extinct genus of sharks

Truyolsodontos is an extinct genus of mackerel sharks that lived during the Late Cretaceous. It contains two valid species, T. estauni and T. magnus. It has been found in Spain, France, Ireland, and possibly Lithuania.
