= List of megamouth shark specimens and sightings =

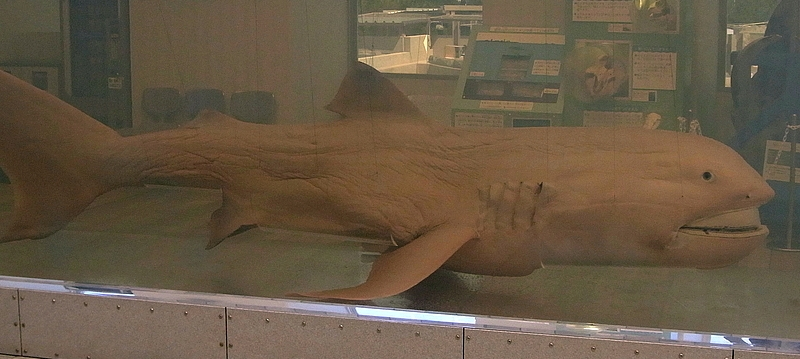
Specimen #7 deposited at Marine World Uminonakamichi, Japan

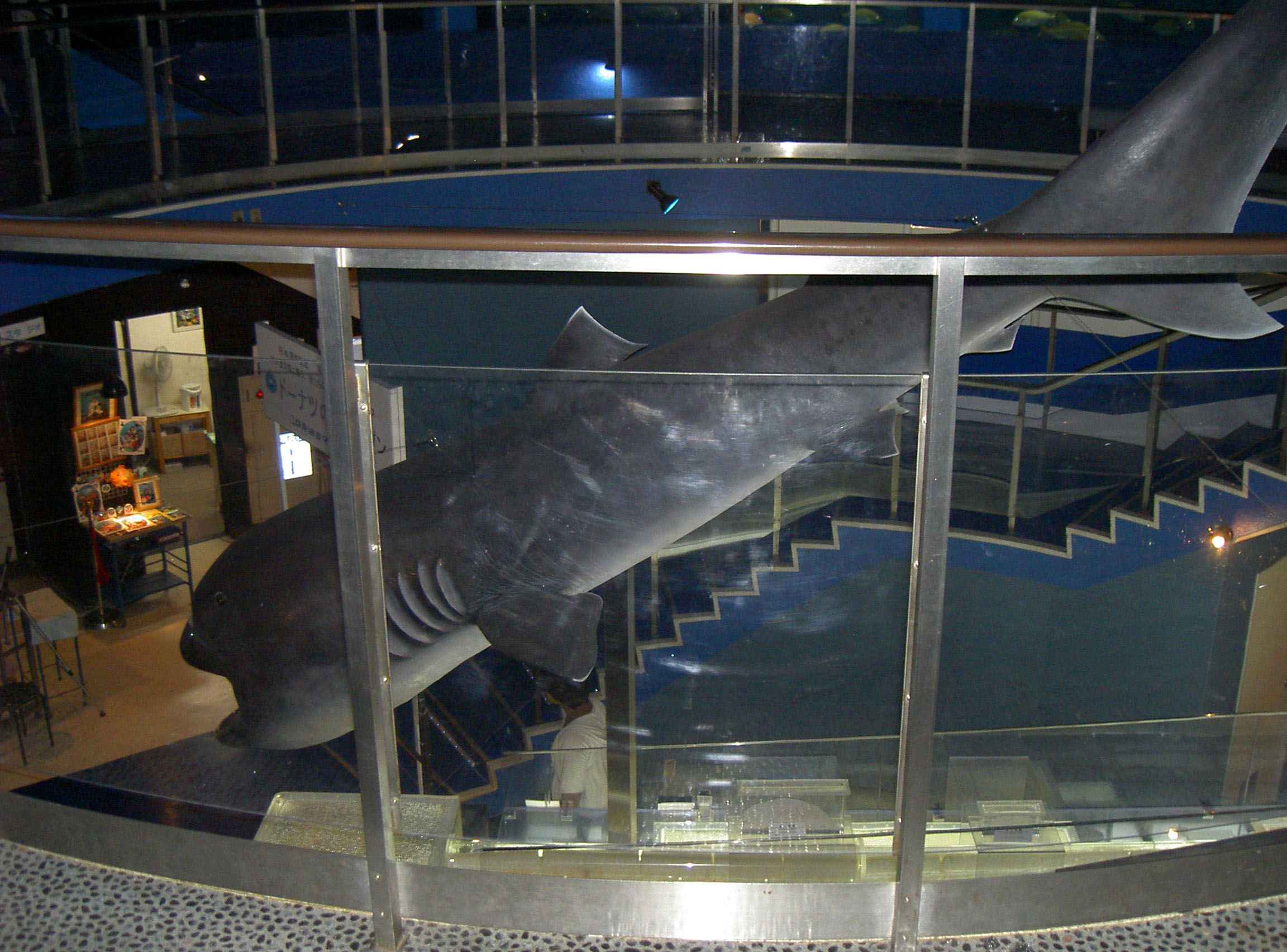
Specimen #37 exhibited at Aburatsubo Marine Park, Japan

This list of megamouth shark specimens and sightings includes recorded human encounters with Megachasma pelagios, popularly known as the megamouth shark. A similar list is published by the Ichthyology Department of the Florida Museum of Natural History at the University of Florida.

== List of megamouth sharks ==
Records are listed chronologically in ascending order and numbered accordingly.

- Date – Date on which the specimen was first captured, found, or observed.
- Location – Area where the specimen was found.
- Sex – Sex and sexual maturity of the specimen.
- Size – Data relating to measurements. Abbreviations used are based on standardised acronyms in ichthyology (see Measurements).
- Method of capture – Circumstances in which the specimen was recovered or observed.
- Disposition – Repository or otherwise fate of the specimen.
- References – Primary sources for each specimen as well as later publications that refer to the specimen.
- Notes – Miscellaneous information.

#	Date	Location	Sex	Size	Method of capture	Disposition	References	Notes
1	15 November 1976	25 miles (40 km) off Kāne'ohe, Oahu, Hawaii (21°51′N 157°46′W)	Male	TL: 4.46 m; PCL: 3.091 m (69.3% TL); WT: 750 kg	Became entangled in the sea anchor of a United States Navy ship	Deposited at the Bernice Pauahi Bishop Museum	Dunford (1976); Taylor (1977); Cressey & Boyle (1978); Johnson (1978); Taylor et al. (1983); [Anonymous] (1983a, b, c, d, e, f); Maisey (1985); Wood (1986); Gallagher (N.d.)	Holotype and first recorded specimen. First examined by Leighton Taylor, who dubbed it "megamouth".
2	29 November 1984	Catalina Island, California	Male	TL: 4.49 m	"Caught"	Deposited at the Natural History Museum of Los Angeles County	[Anonymous] (1984a, b); Lavenberg & Seigel (1985); Diamond (1985); Maisey (1985); Wood (1986)	
3	18 August 1988	Mandurah, Western Australia	Male	TL: 5.15 m; PCL: 3.43 m (66.6% TL)	Found washed ashore	Deposited at Western Australian Museum	Berra & Hutchins (1988); [Anonymous] (1988a, b); Nielsen (1988); Berra & Hutchins (1990); Berra & Hutchins (1991)	
4	23 January 1989	Hamamatsu, Shizuoka, Japan	Male	TL: 4+ m	Found washed ashore	Discarded	Nakaya (1989a); Nakaya (1989b)	
5	June 1989	Yaizu, Shizuoka, Japan	Female?	TL: ~4.9 m	Caught in net	Released alive	Miya et al. (1992); Mollet (2012)	Most likely a female according to John Morrissey.
6	21 October 1990	Dana Point, California	Male	TL: 4.94 m	Found entangled in a drift gillnet	Tracked	Haight (1990a); Haight (1990b); [Anonymous] (1990a, b, c, d); [Anonymous] (1991a, b); Lavenberg (1991); Nelson et al. (1997)	Specimen was taken alive, then fitted with two ultrasonic transmitters and tracked for two days. The shark was observed to move close to the surface at night and deeper during the day.
7	29 November 1994	Hakata Bay, Fukuoka, Japan (34°40′N 130°50′E)	Immature female	TL: 4.71 m; PCL: 3.136 m (66.6% TL)	"Stranded"	Deposited at Marine World Uminonakamichi (Fukuoka, Japan)	Castro (1994); Takada (1994); Takada (1995); Clark & Castro (1995); Castro et al. (1997); Nakaya et al. (1997); Takada et al. (1997); Tanaka & Yano (1997); Yabumoto et al. (1997); Yamaguchi & Nakaya (1997); Yano et al. (1997a); Yano et al. (1997b); Yano et al. (1997c); Goto (1999)	First confirmed female; much studied. Numerous papers on this specimen were published in Biology of the Megamouth Shark (1997).
8	4 May 1995	40 miles (64 km) off Dakar, Senegal (15°08′N 18°22′W)	Immature male	TL: ~1.8 m	Caught in purse seine of French tuna fishing ship	Discarded	Séret (1995)	First recorded specimen from the Atlantic Ocean and smallest known specimen at the time.
9	18 September 1995	southern Brazil	Immature male	TL: 1.9 m; WT: 24.4 kg	Caught by commercial longline vessel	Deposited at Instituto de Pesca in São Paulo, Brazil	Castro & Gadig (1995); Amorim et al. (1995); Amorim et al. (2000)	
10	30 April 1997	12 miles (19 km) south of Mikizaki, Owase, Mie, Japan (33°44′N 136°16′E) at 150 m depth	Female	TL: 5.44 m; WT: 1,040 kg	Caught by fishermen	Deposited at Toba Aquarium	Yano et al. (1997d); Ito et al. (1999)	External brain form and cranial nerves studied in detail.
11	20 February 1998	Macajalar Bay, Cagayan de Oro, Philippines	Male	TL: ~5.49 m	Caught by three fishermen	Consumed	Baldo & Elizaga (1998); Elizaga (1998a); Elizaga (1998b); Reyes (1998); Morrissey & Elizaga (1999); Amorim et al. (2000)	
12	23 April 1998	Atawa, Mie, Japan	Female	TL: 5.2–5.49 m	"Captured"	Discarded	Yano et al. (1998); Amorim et al. (2000); Burgess (N.d.)	
13	30 August 1998	Manado, North Sulawesi, Indonesia (1°46′0″N 124°50′3″E)	Female?	TL: ~5 m	Observed being attacked by sperm whales	Swam away	Pecchioni & Benoldi (1999); Amorim et al. (2000)	
14	1 October 1999	30 miles (48 km) west of San Diego, California	Female	TL: ~17 ft (5.2 m)	Caught in a drift gillnet	Released alive in good condition	Petersen (1999)	Four colour photographs taken. Water temperature was 67.2 °F (19.56 °C).
15	19 October 2001	42 miles (68 km) northwest of San Diego, California	Male	TL: ~18 ft (5.5 m)	Caught in a drift gillnet	Released alive in good condition	Petersen (2001)	Tissue biopsy collected. Water temperature was 65.8 °F (18.78 °C).
16	18 January 2002	eastern Indian Ocean (2°17.9′S 88°12.7′E) at 150 m depth	Immature male	TL: 2.35 m; WT(estimate): >120 kg	Caught in tuna purse seine	Discarded	Boonyapiwat & Vidthayanon (2002)	Caught by M/V Seafdec. Sea surface temperature was 26.8 °C.
17	20 April 2002	Nature's Valley near Plettenberg Bay, approximately 400 km east of Cape Town, South Africa (33°59′S 23°34′E)	Female	TL: 3.5 m; WT: 300 kg	Found washed ashore	Deposited at Port Elizabeth Museum	[Anonymous] (2002); Sanchez (2002); Smale (2002); Smale et al. (2002)	Collected from the beach by Vic Cockcroft of the Centre for Dolphin Studies. Tissue samples taken. Specimen was examined, measured and dissected by Malcolm Smale and Leonard Compagno. Mould of the animal was used for educational displays.
18	6 January 2003	Tablon, Cagayan de Oro, Philippines	?	TL: 4.97 m; BD: 1.01 m	Caught by fisherman	Consumed	Yasay (2003)	Caught by fisherman Eldiposo Pabaida. Personnel of the Bureau of Fisheries and Aquatic Resources 10 (BFAR 10) measured the specimen and took several photographs.
19	26 May 2003	Dana Point, California	?	TL(estimate): 20–25 ft (6–7.6 m); WT (estimate): 5 tons	Sighted at sea	Released	Robbins (2003)	Sighted by Scott Caldwell from the Leslie Anne. A rope was temporarily tied around the animal's tail, preventing escape. No photographs taken; unconfirmed sighting.
20	3 July 2003	800 m off Ki-Lei-Bi, Hualien County, Taiwan	Male	TL: ~2.5 m; WT: 490 kg	Caught in net	Consumed	Mollet (2004)	Caught by fisherman Li. Specimen bought by local seafood store. Stomach was found to be empty.
21	7 August 2003	Omaezaki, Shizuoka, Japan	Male	TL: 4.3 m	?	Deposited at Tokai University	Furuta (2003); Burgess (N.d.)	Prepared for display by taxidermist.
22	8 March 2004	41.6 nautical miles (77.0 km) off Posorja Port, Guayas, Ecuador (2°54.374′S 81°14.858′W)	Male	TL: 4.2 m; WT: ~600 kg	Caught in trammel net	Sent to market	Romero & Cruz (2004)	Caught by small fishing vessel that was unable to bring it aboard. Assisted by the Ecuadorian tuna fish ship Betty Elizabeth. Animal was alive at time of capture and regurgitated food consisting mainly of Engraulis ringens. Surface temperature of the sea was 23.6 °C.
23	13 March 2004	Gapang Beach, northern tip of Sumatra	Immature male	TL: 1.767 m; WT: 13.82 kg	Found washed ashore	Deposited at Cibinong Museum	Lumba Lumba Dive Centre (2004); White et al. (2004)	Smallest recorded specimen. On public display.
24	19 April 2004	Ichihara, Tokyo Bay, Japan	Female	TL: 5.63 m; WT: 2,679 lb (1,215 kg)	Found washed ashore	Taxidermy specimen displayed at the Natural History Museum and Institute	Osedo (2004)	Survived several days before dying from stress. Identified by Masaki Miya, curator of fishes at the National History Museum and Institute in Chiba.
25	23 April 2004	off Ajiro, Shizuoka, Japan	Female	TL: ~4.9 m	Caught by fishermen	Discarded	Furuta (2004)	Japanese newspaper article mentions total length of 5.5-5.6 m and weight of "1", implying over 1 ton.
26	4 November 2004	Barangay Namocon, Tigbauan, Iloilo, Philippines	Female	TL: 5.04 m; WT: ~1 ton	Stranded on beach	Preserved in tank at SEAFDEC Museum	[Anonymous] (2004); Bagarinao (2004)	Stranded alive at around 5 pm and died at around 10 pm. Removed from the beach by 16 fishermen. Preserved in 10% formalin in a 1-ton fiberglass tank.
27	23 January 2005	off Kisei cho Nishiki, Mie, Japan, at 200 m depth	Female	TL: 5.28 m	Caught in purse seine	Deposited at Toba Aquarium	Furuta (2005)	Prepared by taxidermist for display at the aquarium.
28	30 January 2005	Macajalar Bay, Cagayan de Oro, Philippines	Female?	TL: 4.17 m; WT: ~1,000 kg	Caught in net	Buried	Elizaga (2005a); Elizaga (2005b); Lumingkit et al. (2005); Ellorin (2005)	Caught by fisherman Sofronio Casañares. It pulled Casañares's paddle-driven banca for around an hour before stopping, apparently due to exhaustion. Specimen was dissected prior to burial.
29	~25 April 2005	Hualien Port, Hualien County, Taiwan	?	WT: 580 kg	Caught by ocean sunfish driftnetters	Sold at market for human consumption	Wang & Yang (2005a)	Described by fishermen as "big mouthed shark with no teeth".
30	2 May 2005	Hualien Port, Hualien County, Taiwan	?	WT: 580 kg	Caught by ocean sunfish driftnetters	Sold at market for human consumption	Wang & Yang (2005b)	Described by fishermen as "big mouthed shark with no teeth".
31	4 May 2005	Hualien Port, Hualien County, Taiwan	Female	TL: 7.09 m?; WT: 689 kg	Caught by ocean sunfish driftnetter	Dissected at Taipei Zoo/Academia Sinica	Wang & Yang (2005c)	Presumed to be pregnant based on swollen belly. Measured by Shih-Chu Yang. One ectoparasite collected from specimen.
32	5 May 2005	off Hualien County, Taiwan	Female	WT: 807 kg	Caught by fishermen	Dissected at Taipei Zoo	Wang & Yang (2005d)	Likely to have been pregnant. Sold directly to Kwung-Tsao Shao of the Academia Sinica.
33	5 June 2005	off Hualien County, Taiwan	?	WT: 400–500 kg	Caught by fishermen	?	Lin (2005)	Fifth megamouth shark caught in the area within two and a half months.
34	26 January 2006	4 km off Bayawan, Negros Oriental, Philippines	Female	TL: 5 m; WT (estimate): 1 ton/750 kg	Accidentally caught in fishing net	Buried	[Anonymous] (2006); Sala (2006)	Towed by pumpboat of the Bayawan city government to the city's boulevard, but died before it could be released. Very small shrimp found in stomach.
35	12 March 2006	Barra, Macabalan, Cagayan de Oro, Philippines	Female	TL: 7 ft 5 in (2.26 m); WT: 60–80 kg	Accidentally caught in gillnet	?	Cabig (2006)	Identified by Edward B. Yasay. Animal died before Yasay could study it.
36	23 March 2006	"China Sea"	?	TL: 4.7 m; WT: 650 kg	Caught by fishermen	?	Lin (2006)	Photograph taken.
37	2 May 2006	Sagami Bay, Yugawara, Kanagawa Prefecture, Japan	Female	TL: 5.7 m	Found alive in a fixed shore net	Dissected and exhibited at the Aburatsubo Marine Park in Kanagawa	Burgess (2006); Mollet (2012)	Could not be initially landed due to adverse wind conditions. Animal was filmed on third day and died soon afterwards.
38	16 November 2006	Tortugas Bay, Baja California, Mexico	Immature female	TL: 2.149 m; WT: 27 kg	Accidentally caught by commercial shark boat	On display at the Regional Fisheries Center of Ensenada	Castillo-Géniz (2006)	Accidentally caught by crew of the commercial shark boat F/V Corina del Mar. Examined on November 28 by team of technicians and students led by José Leonardo Castillo-Géniz. Samples taken of stomach contents, teeth, and dermal denticles.
39	29 May 2007	Tungkop, Minglanilla, Cebu, Philippines	?	TL: 8.2 ft (2.5 m); WT: ~40–50 kg	Found wounded near shore	?	Parco (2007a); Parco (2007b)	Found alive with head wound; died after several hours.
40	7 June 2007	Sagami Bay, Japan	Female	TL: 5.4 m	Caught in net	Released alive	Mollet (2012)	Photographed, filmed and tagged prior to release.
41	9 July 2007	700 km east of Ibaraki Prefecture, Japan	Female	TL: 3.6–4 m; WT: 360–450 kg	Caught in purse seine	Deposited at Okinawa Churaumi Aquarium	[Anonymous] (2007); Lin (2007); [Anonymous] (2011a, b, c)	Brought to Ishinomaki port and fish market in Miyagi Prefecture. Frozen and transferred to Okinawa Churaumi Aquarium. Dissected at Okinawa Churaumi Aquarium between March 1–3, 2011, in preparation for plastination. During dissection, internal organs were removed, vertebrae sampled for age determination, and head subjected to a CT scan.
42	27 September 2007	Hinunangan, Philippines	?	TL: 2.74 m	Found dead on beach	?	Tajonera (2009a)	Weight unknown. Photographed by Marlou Pan.
43	around 30 June 2008	off Taiwan	?	WT: 200+ kg	"Captured"	?	Mollet (2012); Burgess (N.d.)	Reported by Victor Lin. No photograph and no length or sex data available.
44	10 July 2008	off eastern Taiwan	Female?	TL (estimate): ~5–5.5 m; WT: 870 kg	"Caught"	?	Mollet (2012); Burgess (N.d.)	Claimed to be 9 m long in media reports.
45	5 September 2008	Hinunangan, Philippines	?	TL: 2.13 m	Found stranded alive	Pushed back into water, presumably swam away	Tajonera (2009b)	No photographs taken. Identified by AT-Fisheries.
46	30 March 2009	off eastern coast of Burias Island, Philippines, at ~200 m depth	Male	TL: 4 m; WT: ~400–500 kg	Caught in gillnet by fishermen targeting Rastrelliger kanagurta and Auxis rochei	Consumed	Aca (2009); Dell'Amore (2009)	Died during capture. Tied up and towed to Barangay Dancalan, Donsol, Sorsogon. Identified by Elson Aca of WWF. Cuts found near left side of mouth. Several shrimp larvae found in stomach.
47	9 June 2009	off eastern Taiwan	Female?	TL: 3.90 m; WT: 350 kg	Caught by fishermen from Taitung County	Preserved at local shark museum	Lin (2009)	Bought by local shark museum to be mounted for display.
48	9 July 2009	Praia Grande, Cabo Frio, Rio de Janeiro, Brazil	Male	TL: 5.39 m	Found dead on beach	Partially consumed by locals	Lima et al. (2009); Gomes & Buttigieg (2009); Mollet (2012)	Appeared to have died of natural causes. Autopsy revealed empty stomach.
49	9 July 2009	700 km off Ibaraki Prefecture, Japan	Female	TL: 4 m; WT (estimate): 450 kg	"Caught"	Flesh sold at market for consumption at Ishinomaki		
50	6 November 2009	18 miles (29 km) southwest of Islas San Benito, Mexico	?	TL: 2 m	Caught in fishing net	?	Camacho (2009)	Caught by Ensenada fishermen on vessel Famtasma del Mar, captained by Eden Ruvicel.
51	25 April 2010	Taiwan Strait, off southeastern China	Male	TL (estimate): ≥4 m; WT (estimate): >1000 kg; WT(skin): 100–200 kg	"Caught"	Flesh cut into chunks and sold at market for consumption; skin and jaw saved; to be donated to educational facility	Lin (2010a)	Photographs taken of skinned specimen only.
52	19 June 2010	off eastern Taiwan	?	WT (estimate): ~770 kg	"Caught"	Flesh sold at market for consumption; jaw saved	Lin (2010b); Mollet (2012)	Purchased by fish dealer in northeastern Taiwan "in poor condition, described as tattered and broken or perhaps even cut open". Photographs taken of jaw and flesh chunks only.
53	14 January 2011	500 m off Owase, Mie, Japan	?	TL (estimate): 5 m	"Bycaught and fled by itself"	?		Found being entrapped in a set net in early morning, and on 15th, an aquarium at Osaka tried to purchase the individual alive and make it the first exhibition of live animal in the world, but the shark was found missing in 6am, likely to surpass the net rather than breaking through it.
54	12 June 2011	Bahía de Vizcaíno, off western Baja California peninsula, Mexico	Immature male	TL: 3 m	"Caught"	?	Falcón (2011)	Sent to Ensenada, Mexico, to be sliced into pieces, examined, and photographed. Gill and muscle structure studied by researchers from Mexico and the Scripps Institution of Oceanography. Captured by same vessel that caught specimen #38.
55	1 July 2011	Odawara(Sagami Bay), Kanagawa Prefecture, Japan	Female	TL: ~3 m	?	Deposited at Kanagawa Prefectural Museum of Natural History	Mollet (2012); Burgess (N.d.)	Information and photographs provided by Alex Buttigieg (Mollet, 2012). While some fishermen claimed that another shark shored at Ishibashi area nearby was even bigger, the others consider that this report was of the same individual.
56	January 2012	"Sea of China"	?	TL: 5.65–5.70 m; WT: 1,150–1,250 kg	?	?	Mollet (2012)	Information and photographs provided by Victor Lin (Mollet, 2012).
57	16 October 2012	off eastern Taiwan	Female	TL (estimate): 6 m [4.29 m without tail]; WT (estimate): 800–900 kg	"Caught"	Organs preserved and donated to unspecified university; meat sold	Lin (2012)	Tail broke off during recovery. Total intact length estimated by fish dealer who purchased specimen.
58	14 April 2014	off Shizuoka, Japan	Female	TL: 4.4 meters; WT (estimate): not reported	"Caught"	Autopsy scheduled for May 2014	NHK News Web	Specimen will be studied at Tokai University Marine Science Museum, Shizuoka, Japan
59	24 December 2014	off Futo, Itō, Shizuoka, Japan	?	? ("Massive")	Entrapped in set nets and was released	The shark was released because it was too big to bring ashore.	Fujii M. 伊豆東海岸定置網へのメガマウスザメ混獲事例より. 板鰓類研究会報. No. 51.	
60	28 January 2015	off Albay, Philippines	Male	?	Washed ashore	Preserved on ice pending necropsy and display	Washington Post Inquirer Southern Luzon; Mother Nature Network	
61	2 June 2015	Nghệ An Province, Vietnam	?	TL (estimate): 5 m; WT (estimate): 800–900 kg	Washed ashore		Xác cá 'khủng' trôi dạt vào bờ biển Nghệ An	
62	18 April 2016	5 km off Owase, Mie, Japan	?	TL: 5 m; WT: 1,000 kg	Bycatch in seine nets	Purchased with a successful bid by a local fishmonger, then was delivered to a national research institute, kept in a fledge	体長5メートル、メガマウス水揚げ 尾鷲港（三重県）, Chunichi Shimbun and Chūkyō Television Broadcasting	
63	12 June 2017	Pondol, Hinunangan, Southern Leyte, Philippines	?	TL: 4.3 m; WT: 600 kg	Washed ashore	Buried along the beach	Blingco, Melanie (14 June 2017). "LOOK: Megamouth shark found dead in Southern Leyte". ABS-CBN News.	The shark had multiple wounds that were believed to be the cause of death
64	11 February 2018	18.5 km off Bayawan, Negros Oriental, Philippines	?	TL: 4.34 m	Died after accidentally getting caught in drift nets	Buried along shoreline	Partlow, Mary Judaline (12 February 2018). "Rare megamouth shark dies in fishnet entanglement in NegOr". Philippine News Agency.	Genetic samples were taken from the specimen by the Large Marine Vertebrates Research Institute Philippines (LAMAVE) and the National Museum of the Philippines
65	29 December 2021	San Roque, Tolosa, Leyte, Philippines	Male	TL: ~5 m	Washed ashore	Disposed of by the Bureau of Fisheries and Aquatic Resources	Marticio, Marie Tonette (30 December 2021). "Megamouth shark found dead in Leyte town". Manila Bulletin.	Based on injuries in the dorsal and ventral parts, it is believed to have died after becoming entangled in fishing nets. Strong waves and bad weather may have also contributed.
66	11 June 2022	Bagacay, Gubat, Sorsogon, Philippines	?	TL: 4.57 m	Washed ashore	Planned to be preserved and displayed as museum material by the Bureau of Fisheries and Aquatic Resources	Barcia, Rhaydz (11 June 2022). "Dead megamouth shark washes ashore in Sorsogon". Rappler.	Presumably entangled in nets
67	11 November 2023	Silago, Southern Leyte, Philippines	?	TL: 4.69 m; WT: 1,000 kg	Washed ashore		Dejon, Robert (21 November 2023). "Shark found on the shore of Southern Leyte town". Leyte-Samar Daily Express.	Huge wound in chest area, suspected of having been bitten by a bigger shark
68	12 November 2023	Domolog, Bindoy, Philippines	?	?	Washed ashore		Saavedra, John Rey (20 November 2023). "Shrimp, shark washed ashore no link to Mindanao quake". Philippine News Agency.	
69	16 November 2023	Ipil, Dipaculao, Aurora, Philippines	1 Pregnant female, 7 pups		Washed ashore	Adult female buried along the shoreline, pups were taken for preservation by the National Museum of the Philippines	"Rare megamouth sharks found dead in Aurora". GMA New Online. 28 November 2023.	Pregnant female about to give birth with several juveniles unborn and three birthed that also died, for a total of 7 pups. Cause of death is unknown, but not caused by human intervention.

== Measurements ==
- BD – body diameter.
- PCL – precaudal length, also known as normal length. It is the length from the tip of the snout to the precaudal pit measured in a straight line.
- TL – total length from the tip of the snout to the tip of the longer lobe of the caudal fin, usually measured with the lobes compressed along the midline. It is a straight line measure, not measured over the curve of the body.
- WT – total mass of specimen.
