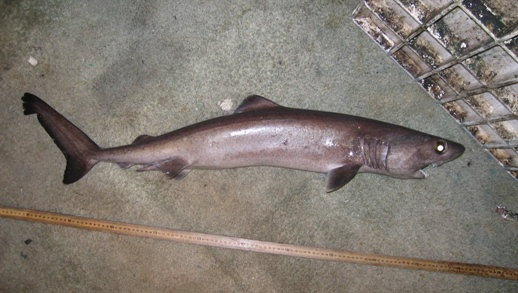

Conservation status
- Least Concern (IUCN 3.1)

Scientific classification
- Kingdom: Animalia
- Phylum: Chordata
- Class: Chondrichthyes
- Subclass: Elasmobranchii
- Division: Selachii
- Order: Lamniformes
- Family: Pseudocarchariidae; Compagno, 1973
- Genus: Pseudocarcharias; Cadenat, 1963
- Species: P. kamoharai

Binomial name
- Pseudocarcharias kamoharai (Matsubara, 1936)
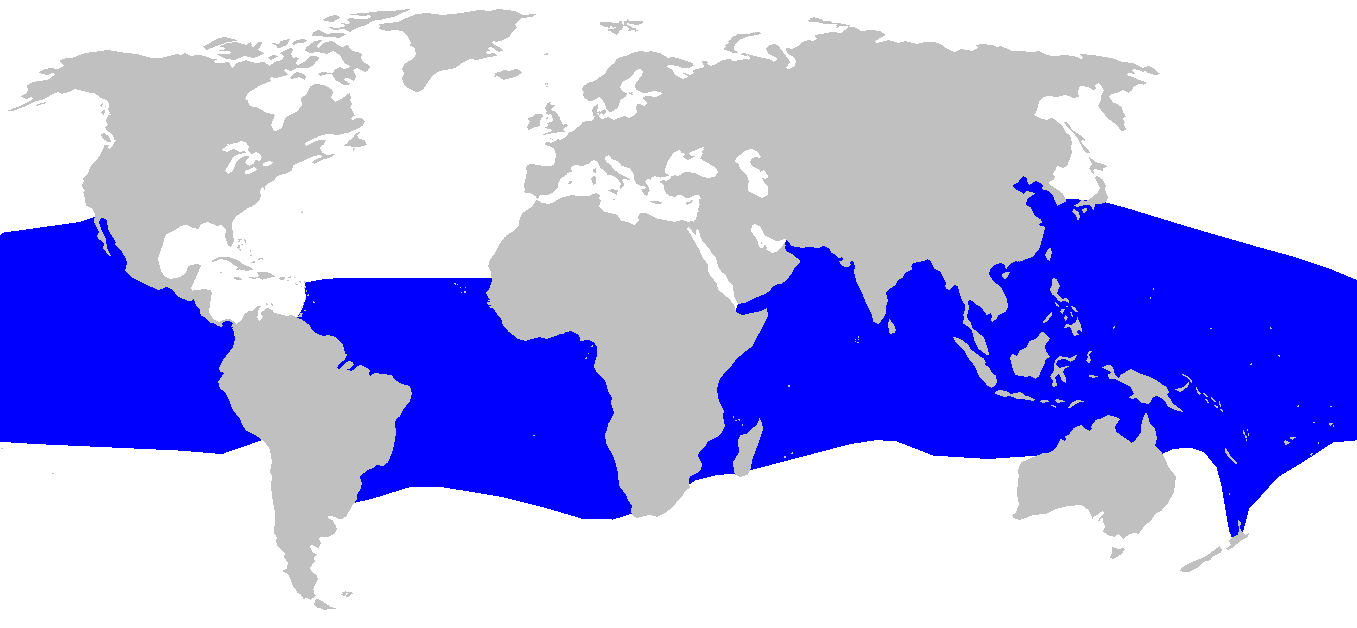
- Range of the crocodile shark

Synonyms
- Carcharias kamoharai Matsubara, 1936; Carcharias yangi Teng, 1959; Pseudocarcharias pelagicus Cadenat, 1963

= Crocodile shark =

Pseudocarcharias kamoharai (species of mackerel shark)

The crocodile shark (Pseudocarcharias kamoharai) is a species of mackerel shark and the only extant member of the family Pseudocarchariidae. A specialized inhabitant of the mesopelagic zone, the crocodile shark can be found worldwide in tropical waters from the surface to a depth of 590 m (1,940 ft). It performs a diel vertical migration, staying below a depth of 200 m (660 ft) during the day and ascending into shallower water at night to feed. Typically measuring only 1 m (3.3 ft) in length, the crocodile shark is the smallest living mackerel shark. It can be distinguished by its elongated cigar-shaped body, extremely large eyes, and relatively small fins.

An active-swimming predator of pelagic bony fishes, squid and shrimp, the crocodile shark has a sizable oily liver that allows it to maintain its position in the water column with minimal effort. The size and structure of its eyes suggests that it is adapted for hunting at night. The crocodile shark is aplacental viviparous, with females typically giving birth to litters of four. The fetuses are oophagous, meaning that they feed on undeveloped eggs ovulated for this purpose by their mother. Due to its small size, the crocodile shark poses little danger to humans and is of little commercial importance. This species was responsible for damaging deep sea fiberoptic cables when the technology was first deployed in 1985. In 2017, one crocodile shark was spotted by a family walking on a UK beach.

== Taxonomy and phylogeny ==
The English common name "crocodile shark" is derived from its Japanese name mizuwani (水鰐, literally "water crocodile"), which refers to its sharp teeth and habit of snapping vigorously when taken out of the water. Other common names for this species include Japanese ragged-tooth shark, Kamohara's sand-shark, and water crocodile. The crocodile shark was first described as Carcharias kamoharai in a 1936 issue of Zoological Magazine (Tokyo) by ichthyologist Kiyomatsu Matsubara, based on a 73.5 cm (28.9 in) long specimen found at the Koti Fish Market in Japan. The type specimen is a 1 m (3.3 ft) long adult male found at a fish market in Su-ao, Taiwan.

After being shuffled between the genera Carcharias and Odontaspis in the family Odontaspididae by various authors, in 1973 Leonard Compagno resurrected Jean Cadenat's 1963 subgenus Pseudocarcharias from synonymy for this species and placed it within its own family. The morphology of the crocodile shark suggests affinity with the megamouth shark (Megachasmidae), basking shark (Cetorhinidae), thresher sharks (Alopiidae), and mackerel sharks (Lamnidae). More recent phylogenetic analyses, based on mitochondrial DNA, have suggested that the crocodile shark is closely related to either the megamouth shark or the sand sharks (Odontaspididae). Alternately, analysis based on dentition suggests that the closest relatives of the crocodile shark are the thresher sharks, followed by the mackerel sharks. Fossil Pseudocarcharias teeth dating to the Serravallian age (13.6–11.6 Ma) of the Miocene epoch have been found in Italy, and are identical to those of the modern-day crocodile shark.

== Description ==
The crocodile shark has a spindle-shaped body with a short head and a bulbous, pointed snout. The eyes are very large and lack nictitating membranes (protective third eyelids). The five pairs of gill slits are long, extending onto the dorsal surface. The sizable, arched jaws can be protruded almost to the tip of the snout and contain large teeth, shaped like spikes in the front and knives on the sides. There are fewer than 30 tooth rows in either jaw; in the upper jaw, the first two large teeth are separated from the lateral teeth by a row of small intermediate teeth.

The pectoral fins are small, broad, and rounded. The pelvic fins are nearly as large as the pectorals. The first dorsal fin is small, low and angular; the second dorsal fin is smaller than the first but larger than the anal fin. The caudal fin is asymmetrical with a moderately long upper lobe. The caudal peduncle is slightly compressed with weak lateral keels. The dermal denticles are small, with a flattened crown bearing small ridges and backward-pointing cusps It is dark brown above and paler below, sometimes with a few dark blotches on the sides and belly and/or a white blotch between the corner of the mouth and the first gill slit. The fins have thin translucent to white margins. The crocodile shark grows to a maximum length of 1.1 m (3.6 ft). Most individuals are 1 m (3.3 ft) long and weigh 4–6 kg (8.8–13.2 lb).

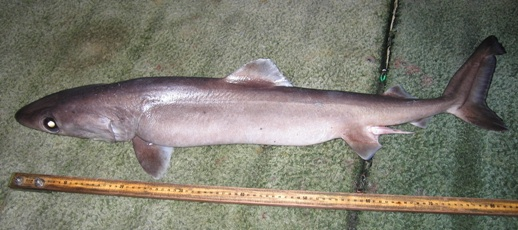
The crocodile shark has a long body and small fins

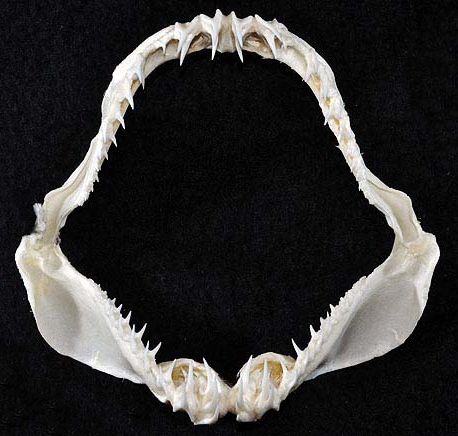
Jaws

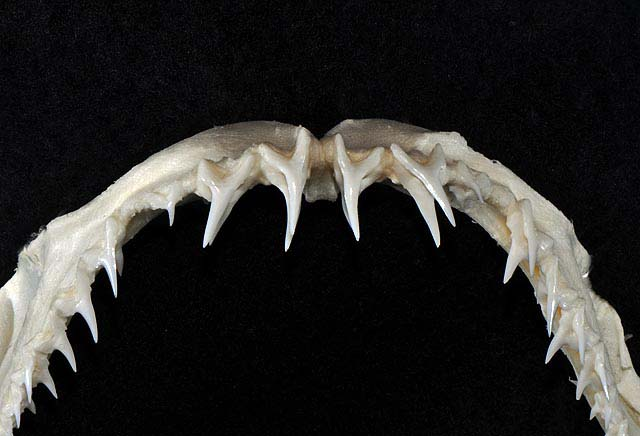
Upper teeth

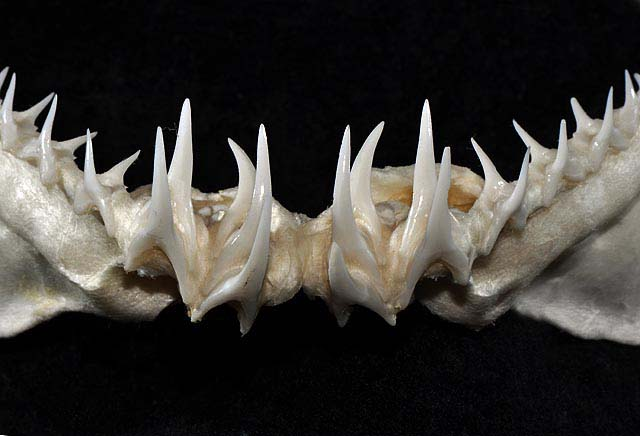
Lower teeth

== Distribution and habitat ==
The crocodile shark is almost circumtropical in distribution. In the Atlantic Ocean, it is known from off Brazil, Cape Verde, Guinea-Bissau, Guinea, Angola, South Africa, and Saint Helena Island, though it has not yet been reported from the northwestern Atlantic. In the Indian Ocean, it occurs in the Mozambique Channel and possibly the Agulhas Current and the Bay of Bengal. In the Pacific, it occurs from Japan, Taiwan, and the Korean Peninsula in the northwest, southward to Indonesia, Australia, and New Zealand, and eastward to the western coast of the Americas from Baja California to Chile, including the Marshall, Phoenix, Palmyra, Johnston, Marquesas, Line, and Hawaiian Islands in between. In New Zealand this species has been recorded at the Three Kings Ridge, off the coast of Northland and on the northern Kermadec Ridge.

From distribution records, the crocodile shark's range seems to be bound by the latitudes 37°N and 44°S, where the average sea surface temperature is 20 °C (68 °F). This species is not evenly distributed but is rather locally abundant in certain areas, suggesting that it is not strongly migratory. The crocodile shark is usually found in the pelagic zone from the surface to a depth of 590 m (1,940 ft). It is occasionally encountered inshore near the bottom and has been known to strand on the beaches of South Africa, possibly after being stunned by upwellings of cold water. In March 2017, one crocodile shark washed ashore dead off the coast of Devon, England in Hope Cove, the first ever seen off the coasts of the United Kingdom. Thus far, it remains unknown as to why this particular shark was present so far north of its normal range.

== Biology and ecology ==
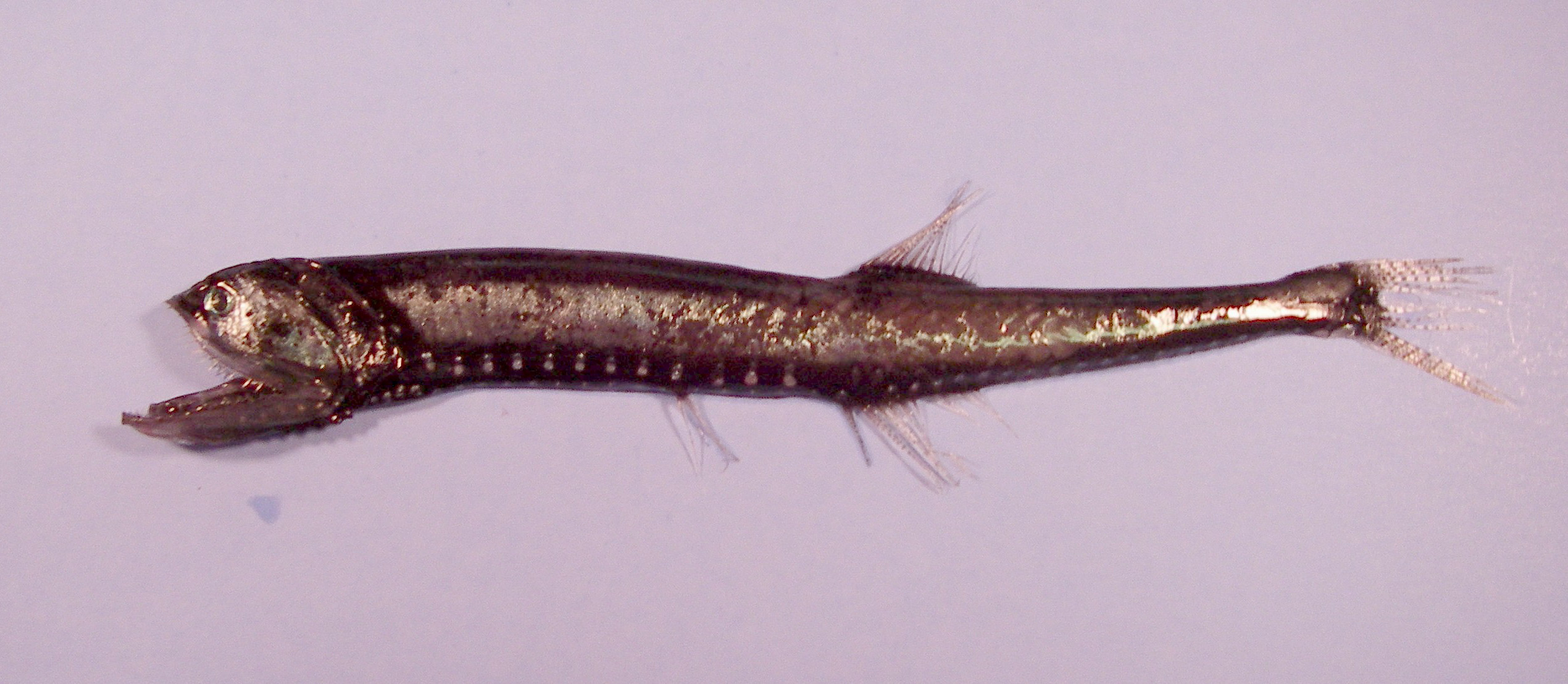
Deepwater fishes such as bristlemouths are preyed upon by the crocodile shark.

With a long body, small fins, and large liver rich in squalene and other low-density lipids, the crocodile shark is convergently similar to mesopelagic dogfish sharks such as the cookiecutter shark (Isistius brasiliensis). The liver may comprise a fifth of the shark's weight, and acts as an incompressible float that allows it to maintain neutral buoyancy in the water column with little effort. Like many other inhabitants of the mesopelagic zone, the crocodile shark apparently migrates closer to the surface at night to feed and descends into deeper water during the day, being rarely found above a depth of 200 m (660 ft) during daytime.

The large eyes of the crocodile shark, equipped with a reflective green or yellow retina and lacking an expanded iris, suggest that it is a nocturnal hunter that relies on sight to pick out the silhouettes or bioluminescence of its prey. Little is known of the crocodile shark's feeding habits; it is thought to be an active, fast-swimming predator based on its strong musculature, large tail, and behavior when captured. On one occasion, a crocodile shark off Cape Point, South Africa, jumped out of the water in pursuit of bait. Its diet consists of small to medium-sized bony fishes (including bristlemouths and lanternfishes), squid (including onychoteuthids, mastigoteuthids, pholidoteuthids, and cranchiids) and shrimp. Crocodile sharks are not known to be preyed upon by any other species.

The crocodile shark is aplacental viviparous and typically gives birth to litters of four, two pups to each uterus. The gestation period is unknown but believed to be long. The embryos have yolk sacs at 3–4 cm (1.2–1.6 in) long; once the yolk sac is fully absorbed they become oophagous: the mother produces large numbers of thin-walled egg capsules that contain 2–9 eggs each, which are then consumed by the unborn embryos. The abdomens of the embryos become characteristically distended with ingested yolk material, which can make up a quarter of the embryo's total weight. It is unclear how two crocodile shark fetuses manage to share a single uterus, when in some other oophagous mackerel sharks such as the sand tiger shark (Carcharias taurus), only one fetus survives in each uterus. The pups are born at approximately 40 cm (16 in) long; males attain maturity at 74–110 cm (29–43.5 in) and females at 89–102 cm (35–40 in). There is no defined reproductive season.

== Human interactions ==
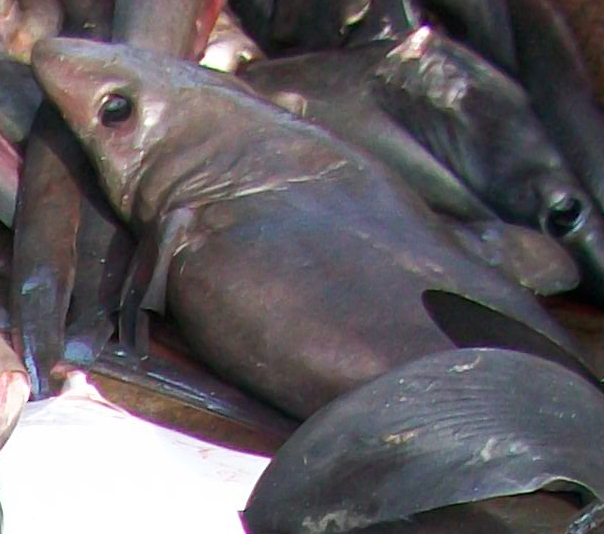
Significant numbers of crocodile sharks are caught accidentally by fisheries.

With its small size, non-cutting teeth, and oceanic habitat, the crocodile shark is not considered dangerous to humans. However, it has a powerful bite that invites caution. This species is a common bycatch of various pelagic longline fisheries meant for tuna and swordfish. The largest numbers are caught by the Japanese yellowfin tuna fishery and the Australian swordfish fishery, both operating in the Indian Ocean. This species is also sometimes caught on squid jigs and in tuna gillnets. It is usually discarded due to its small size and low-quality meat. However, its oily liver is potentially valuable. No data is available on the population status of the crocodile shark, though it is probably declining from bycatch mortality. Coupled with its low reproductive rate, this has led the International Union for Conservation of Nature (IUCN) to assessed it as Near Threatened. In June 2018 the New Zealand Department of Conservation classified the crocodile shark as "Data Deficient" with the qualifier "Secure Overseas" under the New Zealand Threat Classification System.

After AT&T installed the first deep sea fiberoptic cables between Gran Canaria and Tenerife in the Canary Islands in September 1985, the system suffered a series of shorts that necessitated costly repairs. It was discovered that attacks from the crocodile shark were responsible for most of the failures, possibly because they were attracted to the electric field around the cables. Since crocodile sharks are not benthic in nature, they were presumably biting the cables as they were being deployed. The problem was solved by protecting the cables with a layer of steel tape beneath a dense polyethylene coating.
