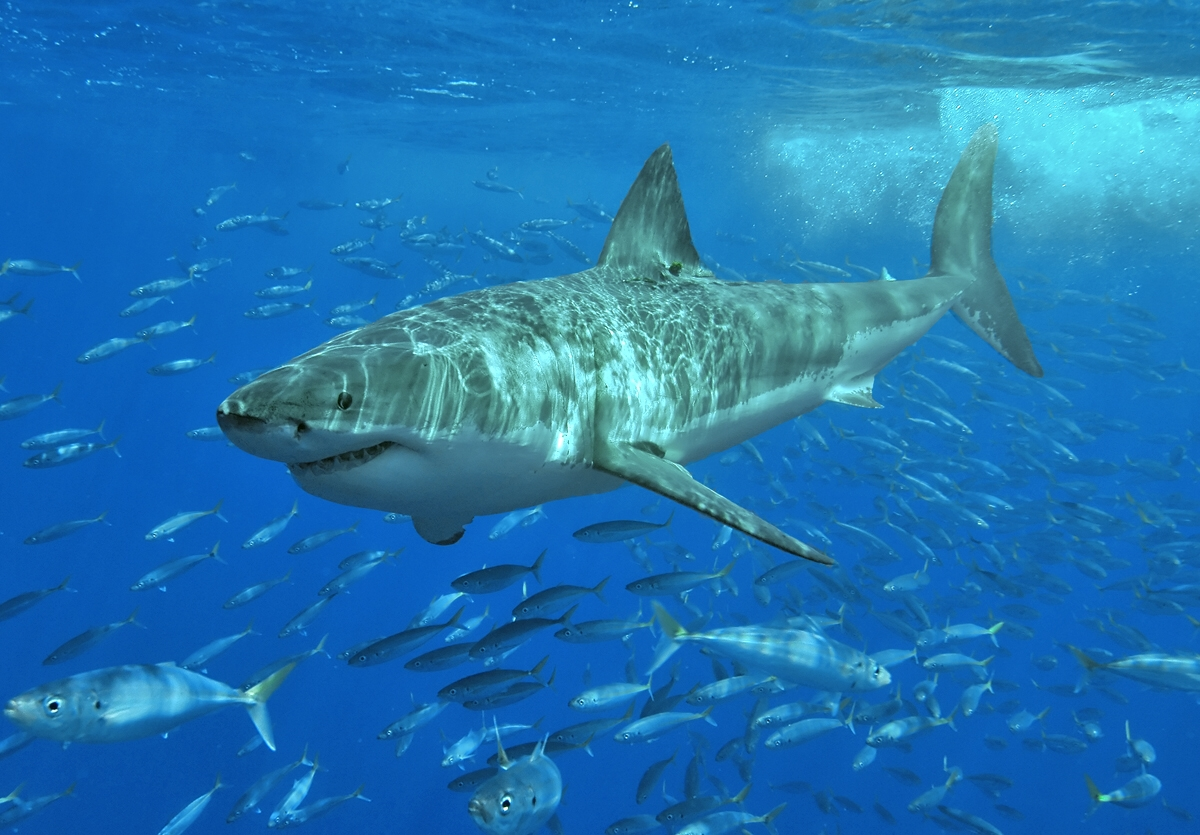
- Great white shark, Carcharodon carcharias

Scientific classification
- Kingdom: Animalia
- Phylum: Chordata
- Class: Chondrichthyes
- Subclass: Elasmobranchii
- Division: Selachii
- Superorder: Galeomorphi
- Order: Lamniformes; L. S. Berg, 1958

Families
- See text

= Lamniformes =

Lamniformes Temporal range: Early Cretaceous–present Possible Late Jurassic record if Palaeocarcharias is a lamniform

Order of sharks

The Lamniformes (/ˈlæmnɪfɔːrmiːz/, from Greek lamna "fish of prey") are an order of sharks commonly known as mackerel sharks (which may also refer specifically to the family Lamnidae). It includes some of the most familiar species of sharks, such as the great white and mako sharks as well as less familiar ones, such as the goblin shark and megamouth shark.

Members of the order are distinguished by possessing two dorsal fins, an anal fin, five gill slits, eyes without nictitating membranes, and a mouth extending behind the eyes. Species in two families of Lamniformes – Lamnidae and Alopiidae – are distinguished for maintaining a higher body temperature than the surrounding waters.

Members of the group include macropredators, generally of medium-large size, including the largest macropredatory shark ever, the extinct Otodus megalodon, as well as large planktivores.

Although some authors have argued that the Late Jurassic Palaeocarcharias should be considered the oldest known lamniform, this is disputed. The earliest unambiguous records of lamniformes are from the Early Cretaceous. Lamniformes underwent a major adaptive radiation during the Cretaceous and became prominent elements of oceanic ecosystems. They reached their highest diversity during the Late Cretaceous, but severely declined during the K-Pg extinction, before rebounding to a high but lower diversity peak during the Paleogene. Lamniformes have declined in diversity since the Eocene, with only 15 species alive today, compared to over 290 extant species in the Carcharhiniformes, which have evolved into medium and large body sizes during the same timeframe. The causes of the decline are uncertain, but are likely to have involved both biotic factors like competition and non-biotic factors like temperature and sea level.

== Species ==
The order Lamniformes includes 10 families with 22 species, with a total of eight living families and 15 living species:

Order Lamniformes

- Family Alopiidae Bonaparte, 1838 (thresher sharks)
  - Genus Alopias Rafinesque, 1810
    - Alopias pelagicus Nakamura, 1935 (pelagic thresher)
    - Alopias superciliosus R. T. Lowe, 1841 (bigeye thresher)
    - Alopias vulpinus (Bonnaterre, 1788) (common thresher)
- Family †Anacoracidae Capetta, 1987 (extinct, Cretaceous period)
  - Genus †Squalicorax (crow sharks)
  - Genus †Scindocorax
  - Genus †Nanocorax
  - Genus †Ptychocorax
- Family †Aquilolamnidae Vullo et al., 2021? (eagle sharks) (extinct, Late Cretaceous period)
  - Genus †Aquilolamna Vullo et al., 2021
    - †Aquilolamna milarcae Vullo et al., 2021
- Family Carchariidae Müller & Henle, 1838
  - Genus Carcharias Rafinesque, 1810
    - Carcharias taurus Rafinesque, 1810 (sand tiger shark)
- Family Cetorhinidae Gill, 1862
  - Genus Cetorhinus Blainville, 1816
    - Cetorhinus maximus (Gunnerus, 1765) (basking shark)
    - †Cetorhinus huddlestoni (Welton, 2014)
    - †Cetorhinus piersoni (Welton, 2015)
  - Genus †Keasius (Welton, 2013)
- Family †Eoptolamnidae (extinct, Late Cretaceous period)
  - Genus †Eoptolamna
    - †Eoptolamna eccentrolopha
  - Genus †Leptostyrax
    - †Leptostyrax macrorhiza
  - Genus †Protolamna
    - †Protolamna sokolovi
    - †Protolamna borodini
    - †Protolamna carteri
    - †Protolamna compressidens
    - †Protolamna gigantea
    - †Protolamna roanokeensis
- Family Lamnidae J. P. Müller and Henle, 1838 (mackerel sharks or white sharks)
  - Genus Carcharodon A. Smith, 1838
    - Carcharodon carcharias (Linnaeus, 1758) (great white shark)
    - †Carcharodon hubbelli Ehret, Macfadden, Jones, Devries, Foster & Salas-Gismondi, 2012 (Hubbell's white shark)
    - †Carcharodon caifassii Lawley, 1876
    - †Carcharodon carcharias-f Linnaeus, 1758
  - Genus Isurus Rafinesque, 1810
    - Isurus oxyrinchus Rafinesque, 1810 (shortfin mako)
    - Isurus paucus Guitart-Manday, 1966 (longfin mako)
  - Genus Lamna Cuvier, 1816
    - Lamna ditropis Hubbs & Follett, 1947 (salmon shark)
    - Lamna nasus (Bonnaterre, 1788) (porbeagle)
- Family †Otodontidae Gluckman, 1964 (extinct, Late Cretaceous to Pliocene) (megatoothed sharks)
  - Genus †Cretalamna Gluckman, 1958
  - Genus †Otodus (Agassiz, 1843)
    - †Otodus obliquus (Agassiz, 1838)
    - †Otodus angustidens (Agassiz, 1843)
    - †Otodus chubutensis (Agassiz, 1843)
    - †Otodus megalodon (Agassiz, 1843) (megalodon)
    - †Otodus auriculatus (Jordan, 1923)
    - †Otodus sokolovi (Zhelezko and Kozlov, 1999)
    - †Otodus poseidoni (Zhelezko and Kozlov, 1999)
    - †Otodus minor (Giebel, 1943)
    - †Otodus hastalis (Lawley, 1876)
    - †Otodus limhamnensis (Davis, 1890)
    - †Otodus debrayi (Leriche, 1906)
    - †Otodus naidini (Zhelezko in Zhelezko & Kozlov)
  - Genus †Megaselachus
    - †Megaselachus subauriculatus? (Glickman, 1964)
  - Genus †Megalolamna Shimada et al., 2016
  - Genus †Palaeocarcharodon Casieer, 1960
  - Genus †Kenolamna Siversson, 2017
- Family Megachasmidae Taylor, Compagno & Struhsaker, 1983
  - Genus Megachasma Taylor, Compagno & Struhsaker, 1983
    - Megachasma pelagios Taylor, Compagno & Struhsaker, 1983 (megamouth shark)
- Family Mitsukurinidae D. S. Jordan, 1898
  - Genus Mitsukurina D. S. Jordan, 1898
    - Mitsukurina owstoni D. S. Jordan, 1898 (goblin shark)
- Family Odontaspididae Müller & Henle, 1839
  - Genus Odontaspis Agassiz, 1838
    - Odontaspis ferox (Risso, 1810) (smalltooth sand tiger)
    - Odontaspis noronhai (Maul, 1955) (bigeye sand tiger)
- Family Pseudocarchariidae Compagno, 1973
  - Genus Pseudocarcharias Cadenat, 1963
    - Pseudocarcharias kamoharai (Matsubara, 1936) (crocodile shark)
- Family †Cardabiodontidae (extinct, Late Cretaceous period)
  - Genus †Cardabiodon Siverson, 1999
    - †Cardabiodon ricki Siverson, 1999
    - †Cardabiodon venator Siverson and Lindgren, 2005
  - Genus †Dwardius Siverson, 1999
  - Genus †Parotodus? Cappetta, 1980
- Family †Cretoxyrhinidae (extinct, Late Cretaceous period)
  - Genus †Cretoxyrhina Agassiz, 1843
    - †Cretoxyrhina vraconensis Zhelezko, 2000
    - †Cretoxyrhina denticulata Glückman, 1957
    - †Cretoxyrhina agassizensis Underwood and Cumbaa, 2010
    - †Cretoxyrhina mantelli Agassiz, 1843 (ginsu shark)
- Family †Serratolamnidae
  - Genus †Serratolamna
- Family †Ptychodontidae (extinct, Cretaceous period)
  - Genus †Ptychodus (16+ species)

Family	Image	Common name	Genera	Species	Description
Alopiidae		Thresher sharks	1	3	Thresher sharks are large sharks found in temperate and tropical oceans around the world. The common name refers to its distinctive, thresher-like tail or caudal fin which can be as long as the body of the shark itself.
Carchariidae		Sand tiger sharks	1	1-2	The second-most basal members of the Lamniformes, the Carchariidae were formerly placed within the Odontaspididae due to their close morphological similarities to them. However, phylogenetic studies have revealed them to be a distinct, more basal group. It contains only one to two species, which are widespread but highly endangered.
Cetorhinidae		Basking sharks	1	1	The basking shark is the second largest living fish, after the whale shark, and the second of three plankton-eating sharks, the other two being the whale shark and megamouth shark. It is a cosmopolitan migratory species, found in all the world's temperate oceans. It is generally a harmless filter feeder with a greatly enlarged mouth, which cruises leisurely over huge distances covering three miles every hour. During each of those hours, it strains about 1.5 million L of water through more than 5,000 gill rakers for plankton. Basking sharks have long been a commercially important fish, as a source of food, shark fin, animal feed, and shark liver oil. Overexploitation has reduced its populations to the point where some have disappeared and others need protection.
Lamnidae		Mackerel sharks	3	5	Mackerel sharks, also called white sharks, are large, fast-swimming sharks, found in oceans worldwide. They include the great white, the mako, porbeagle shark, and salmon shark. Mackerel sharks have pointed snouts, spindle-shaped bodies, and gigantic gill openings. The first dorsal fin is large, high, stiff and angular or somewhat rounded. The second dorsal and anal fins are minute. The caudal peduncle has a few or less distinct keels. The teeth of modern Lamnidae are up to 5 centimeters long. The fifth gill opening is in front of the pectoral fin and spiracles are sometimes absent. They are heavily built sharks, sometimes weighing nearly twice as much as sharks of comparable length from other families. Many in the family are among the fastest-swimming fish.
Megachasmidae		Megamouth sharks	1	1	The megamouth shark is an extremely rare species of deepwater shark, and the smallest of the three filter-feeding sharks. Since its discovery in 1976, only a few megamouth sharks have been seen, with 55 specimens known to have been caught or sighted as of 2012, including three recordings on film. Like the basking shark and whale shark, it is a filter feeder, and swims with its enormous mouth wide open, filtering water for plankton and jellyfish. It is distinctive for its large head with rubbery lips. It is so unlike any other type of shark that it is classified in its own family, though it may belong in the family Cetorhinidae of which the basking shark is currently the sole member.
Mitsukurinidae		Goblin sharks	1	1	Goblin sharks have a distinctive long, trowel-shaped, beak-like snout, much longer than those of other sharks. The snout contains sensory organs to detect the electrical signals given off by the shark's prey. They also possess long, protrusible jaws. When the jaws are retracted, the shark resembles a grey nurse shark with an unusually long nose. Goblin sharks include one living genus and three extinct genera. The only known living species is Mitsukurina owstoni.
Odontaspididae		Sand sharks	1	2	Sand sharks are so-called because they inhabit sandy shorelines, and are often seen trolling the ocean floor in the surf zone. They are found in warm or temperate waters throughout the world's oceans, except the eastern Pacific. Sand sharks have a large second dorsal fin. They grow up to 10 feet in adult length. The body tends to be brown in color with dark markings in the upper half. These markings disappear as they mature. Their needle-like teeth are highly adapted for impaling fish, their main prey. Their teeth are long, narrow, and very sharp with smooth edges, with one and on occasion two smaller cusplets on either side.
Pseudocarchariidae		Crocodile sharks	1	1	Only one species is in the crocodile shark family. It is a specialized inhabitant of the mesopelagic zone, found worldwide in tropical waters from the surface to a depth of 590 m (1,940 ft). It performs a diel vertical migration, staying below a depth of 200 m (660 ft) during the day and ascending into shallower water at night to feed. Typically measuring only 1 m (3.3 ft) in length, the crocodile shark is the smallest living mackerel shark. It can be distinguished by its elongated, cigar-shaped body, extremely large eyes, and relatively small fins. Substantial numbers are caught as bycatch, leading it to be assessed as near threatened by the International Union for Conservation of Nature.
†Anacoracidae		Anacoracidae	4	39	Contains 4 genera of shark from the mid-Late Cretaceous, most notably Squalicorax, found worldwide.
†Ptychodontidae		Ptychodontidae	1	16	Only a single genus, Ptychodus, which contains at least 16 species of large (up to 10 metres (33 ft) in length) sharks with a specialised crushing dentition, known from the late Early to Late Cretaceous found worldwide.
†Archaeolamnidae		Archaeolamnidae	1	3	Contains a single Late Cretaceous genus, Archaeolamna, with 3 species.
†Aquilolamnidae (?)		Aquilolamnidae	1	1	Tentatively assigned to Lamniformes; an extremely unusual, likely planktivorous shark with incredibly long, winglike pectoral fins, giving it a superficial resemblance to a manta ray, which it likely had a similar ecological niche to.
†Cardabiodontidae		Cardabiodontidae	2	5	Extinct, the Cardabiodontidae include Cardabiodon and Dwardius, both genera from the Cretaceous which have existed in Australia, Canada, and Europe.
†Cretoxyrhinidae		Cretoxyrhinidae	1	4	Extinct, the Cretoxyrhinidae includes the sole member Cretoxyrhina (pictured), a genus from the mid-Late Cretaceous.
†Eoptolamnidae		Eoptolamnidae	3	8	An extinct family of Late Cretaceous lamniforms.
†Haimirichiidae		Haimirichiidae	1	1	Represented only by the Cretaceous Haimirichia from Morocco.
†Otodontidae		Megatoothed sharks	9	27	Extinct, the Otodontidae lived from the early-mid Cretaceous to the Pliocene, and reached huge sizes. The species megalodon (pictured), the largest shark ever, belongs to this group.
†Palaeocarchariidae (?)		Palaeocarchariidae	1	1	A Late Jurassic shark considered one of the closest relatives to the Lamniformes, alternately placed in its own order.
†Pseudocoracidae		Pseudocoracidae	2	7	5 species in two genera from the Late Cretaceous, previously classified in Anacoracidae.
†Pseudoscapanorhynchidae		Pseudoscapanorhynchidae	6	18	Known throughout the Cretaceous, possible Paleogene occurrence.
†Serratolamnidae		Serratolamnidae	1	7	7 species worldwide, known from the Late Cretaceous.
†Truyolsodontidae		Truyolsodontidae	1	1	Represented only by the Cretaceous Truyolsodontos from Spain.
