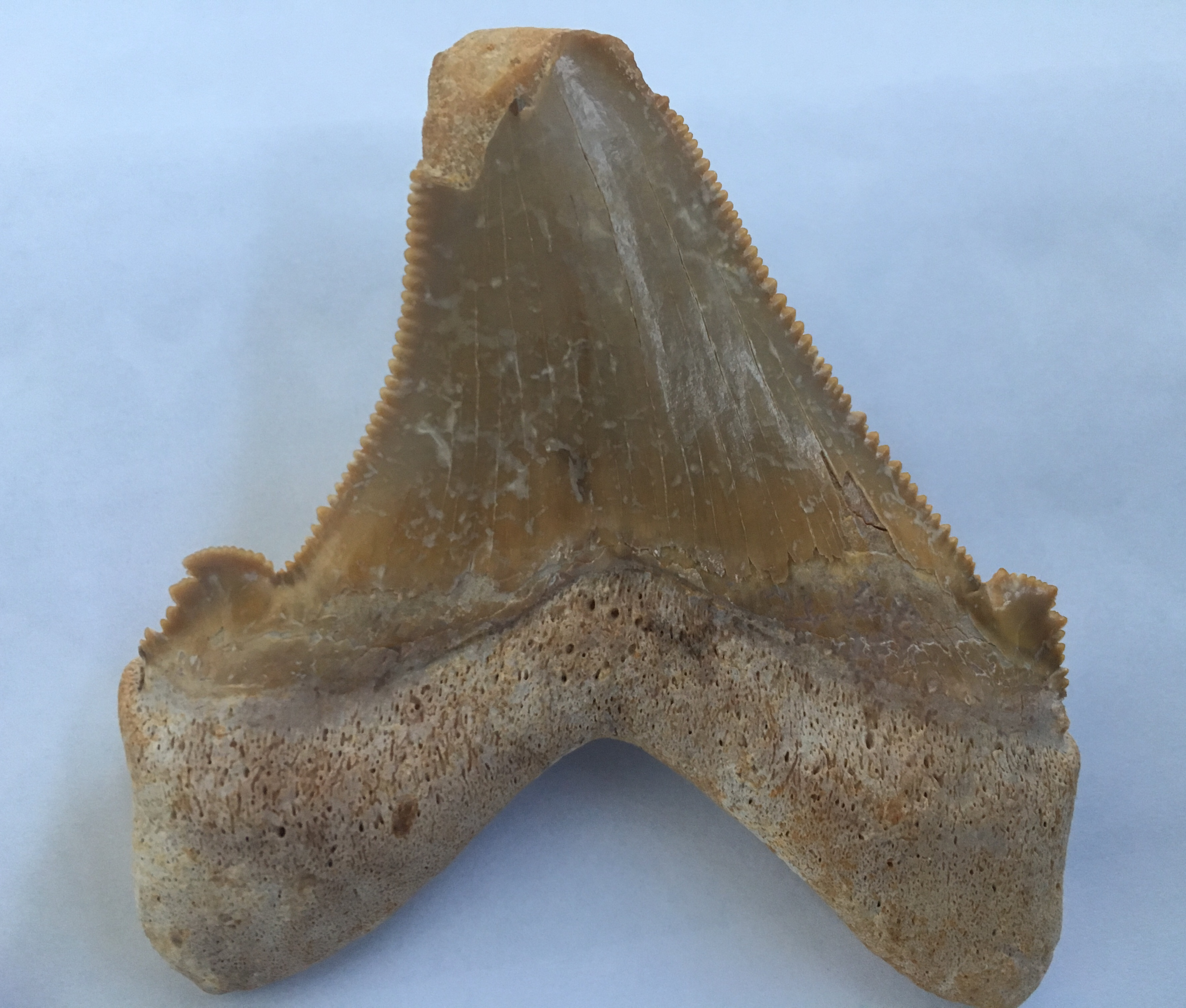
- Otodus sokolovi tooth from Dakhla, Western Sahara

Scientific classification
- Kingdom: Animalia
- Phylum: Chordata
- Class: Chondrichthyes
- Subclass: Elasmobranchii
- Division: Selachii
- Order: Lamniformes
- Family: †Otodontidae
- Genus: †Otodus
- Species: †O. sokolovi

Binomial name
- †Otodus sokolovi Jaekel, 1895

Subspecies
- †O. s. caspiensis (Zhelezko in Zhelezko & Kozlov, 1999); †O. s. sokolovi? (Zhelezko in Zhelezko & Kozlov, 1999)

Synonyms
- Carcharocles sokolovi; Carcharocles sokolowi Jaekel, 1895 (sic)

= Otodus sokolovi =

Otodus sokolovi Temporal range: Lutetian-Rupelian 47–28 Ma

Extinct species of shark

Otodus sokolovi is an extinct species or chronospecies of large shark in the family Otodontidae which may represent a transitional chronospecies between Otodus auriculatus and Otodus angustidens. They differ from the former with a less curved root and finer serrations and from the latter with more prominent and recurved cusps. Due to the subtle differences, it is sometimes lumped into O. auriculatus. It, along with the rest of Otodus, is sometimes placed in the genus Carcharocles. Due to its similarities with other chronospecies, it is difficult to tell exactly when it arose and went extinct. Generally, it is said to span from the late Eocene to early Oligocene. They are best known from the late Eocene localities around Dakhla, Morocco and Fayum, Egypt but are represented in many deposits of contemporary age. It measured at least 6 metres (20 ft) long.
