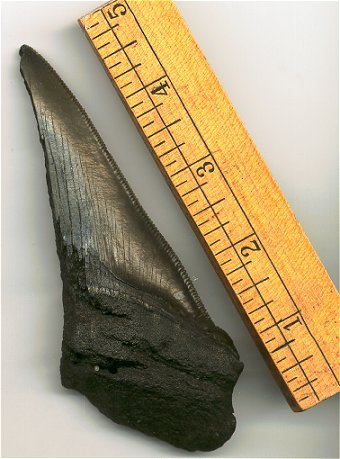
- Partially preserved O. chubutensis broken tooth with a slant height of 129 mm (5.1 in)

Scientific classification
- Kingdom: Animalia
- Phylum: Chordata
- Class: Chondrichthyes
- Subclass: Elasmobranchii
- Division: Selachii
- Order: Lamniformes
- Family: †Otodontidae
- Genus: †Otodus
- Species: †O. chubutensis

Binomial name
- †Otodus chubutensis Ameghino, 1901

Synonyms
- Carcharodon mexicanus Agassiz, 1843; Carcharocles chubutensis? Jordan & Hannibal, 1923; Carcharodon chubutensis (Ameghino, 1901); Carcharodon productus Agassiz, 1843; Megaselachus chubutensis Glikman, 1964; Otodus subauriculatus (Agassiz, 1843); Carcharocles subauriculatus (Jordan & Hannibal, 1923); Procarcharodon subauriculatus Leriche, 1942; Carcharodon subauriculatus Agassiz, 1843; Carcharodon megalodon chubutensis Ameghino, 1908; Procarcharodon chubutensis Leriche, 1942; Otodus turgidus? Agassiz, 1839; Carcharocles turgidus? Jordan & Hannibal, 1923; Carcharodon turgidus? Agassiz, 1839

= Otodus chubutensis =

Otodus chubutensis Temporal range: Late Oligocene-Middle Miocene, 28–11.6 Ma

Species of fossil sharks

Otodus chubutensis, meaning "ear-shaped tooth of Chubut", from Ancient Greek ὠτ (ōt, meaning "ear") and ὀδούς (odoús, meaning "tooth") – thus, "ear-shaped tooth", is an extinct species of prehistoric megatoothed sharks in the genus Otodus, lived from Late Oligocene to Middle Miocene, between 28 and 11.6 million years ago. The largest individuals were about 13.5 metres (44 ft) long. This shark is considered a close relative or ancestor of the famous prehistoric megatoothed shark Otodus megalodon.

== Taxonomy ==
As is the case with other known megatoothed sharks, the genus of O. chubutensis remains in dispute. The Swiss naturalist Louis Agassiz first identified this shark as a species of Carcharodon in 1843, naming It as C. subauriculatus based in MLP 12-3724 specimen. In 1906, Ameghino renamed this shark as Carcharodon chubutensis based in the MACN-A 12927. Some time later, it was discovered that C. subauriculatus would be a junior synonym of C. chubutensis. In 1964, shark researcher, L. S. Glikman recognized the transition of Otodus obliquus to O. auriculatus. In 1987, shark researcher, H. Cappetta reorganized the O. auriculatus - O. megalodon lineage and placed all related megatoothed sharks along with this species in the genus Carcharocles (now Otodus). Finally, the complete Otodus obliquus to O. megalodon progression became clear and has since gained the acceptance of many shark researchers.

Within the Otodus lineage; O. chubutensis is the succeeding species of O. angustidens and is followed by O. megalodon. In short, O. chubutensis is considered a possible ancestor of O. megalodon. However, due to its co-existence with O. megalodon during the Miocene and Pliocene epochs, it is regarded as a morpho-species.

== Description ==
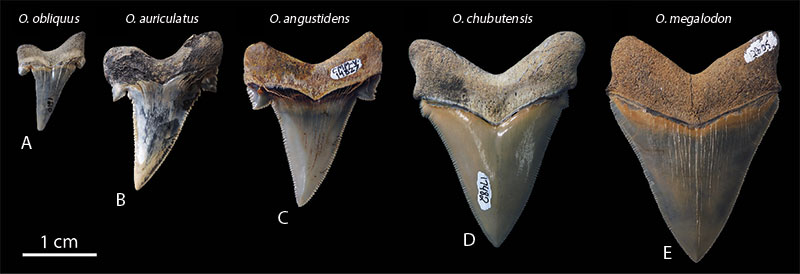
Evolution of O. obliquus to O. megalodon based in teeth.

Otodus chubutensis was a large lamniform shark, with the largest individuals reaching a body length maximum of 13.5 metres (44 ft). Relatively large individuals reached body lengths of 9–11 metres (30–36 ft). Smaller individuals were still about the size of the modern great white shark, reaching body lengths of 4.6–6.3 metres (15–21 ft). O. chubutensis was one of the largest sharks of its time.

=== Teeth ===
The teeth of O. chubutensis are very similar to O. megalodon, but It differs from O. megalodon by having concave teeth, a more robust root, the crown is more inflated and triangular, less irregular, with the serrations being slightly rounded, robust, with the cusp being more visible than in O. megalodon, which has a smaller cusp than in O. chubutensis. Therefore, O. chubutensis may or may not have cusps, just as O. megalodon may have slightly visible cusps; O. chubutensis, in its broader and less common form, may have widely vestigial or absent cusps.

== Paleoecology ==
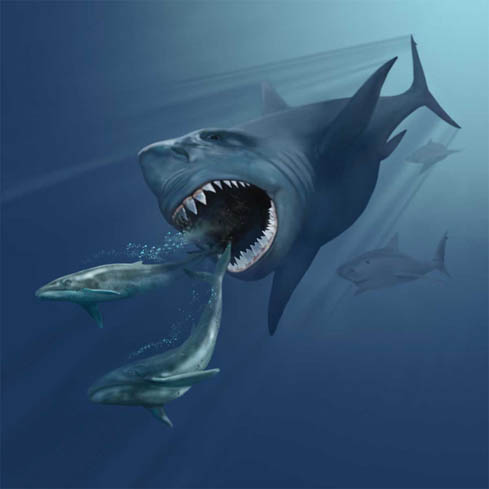
O. chubutensis thought to have been an apex predator much like its close relative, O. megalodon. Life reconstruction by Karen Carr

O. chubutensis was the apex predator of the Miocene era and occupied an extremely high trophic level. Paleontological research suggests that this species may have changed habitat preferences through time, or it may have had enough behavioral flexibility to occupy different environments at different times. Nitrogen isotopes found that O. chubutensis had an exceptionally high trophic level which was higher than modern great white sharks. Considering the high trophic level was present before the appearance of O. megalodon, its been hypothesized that high trophic level contributed to gigantism in Otodus. On the other hand, zinc isotopic analysis by McCormack et al. (2022) found O. chubutensis had the lowest δ^{66}Zn values among sympatric sharks in Early Miocene assemblages, being comparable to modern great white sharks. This suggests it occupied a higher trophic level position than Carcharodon hastalis.

=== Diet ===
Otodus chubutensis was likely an apex predator and commonly preyed upon fish, sea turtles, cetaceans (e.g. whales), and sirenids.

There is also potential evidence that Otodus hunted raptorial sperm whales; a tooth belonging to an undetermined 4 m (13 ft) physeteroid closely resembling those of Acrophyseter discovered in the Nutrien Aurora Phosphate Mine in North Carolina suggests that a megalodon or O. chubutensis may have aimed for the head of the sperm whale in order to inflict a fatal bite, the resulting attack leaving distinctive bite marks on the tooth. While scavenging behavior cannot be ruled out as a possibility, the placement of the bite marks is more consistent with predatory attacks than feeding by scavenging, as the jaw is not a particularly nutritious area to for a shark feed or focus on. The fact that the bite marks were found on the tooth's roots further suggest that the shark broke the whale's jaw during the bite, suggesting the bite was extremely powerful. The fossil is also notable as it stands as the first known instance of an antagonistic interaction between a sperm whale and an otodontid shark recorded in the fossil record.

There is also evidence that eurhinodelphinids were also hunted in a similar way. Three Neogene odontocete peduncular caudal vertebrae from the Pliocene Yorktown Formation show bilateral gouge marks consistent with having been actively bitten and wedged between adjacent teeth of O. megalodon or O. chubutensis. None of the vertebrae show any signs of healing. The occurrence of bite marks suggests the event was an active predation event rather than a scavenging event.

== Fossil record ==
This species is also known from fossil teeth and some fossilized vertebral centra. Shark skeletons are composed of cartilage and not bone, and cartilage rarely gets fossilized. Hence, fossils of O. chubutensis are generally poorly preserved. Although the teeth of O. chubutensis are morphologically similar to teeth of O. megalodon, they are comparatively slender with curved crown, and with presence of lateral heels feebly serrated. Fossils of this species have been found in North America, South America, Africa, and Europe. Its fossils have also been discovered in Asia and Australia. The fossil record confirmed for this species spans from the Late Oligocene to the Middle Miocene. This suggests that O. chubutensis coexisted with Megalodon for a long time as a variant form.

=== Locations of Fossils ===
Regions where fossils of Otodus chubutensis have been discovered
| Epoch | Formation | State/Region | Continent |
|---|---|---|---|
| Miocene | Moghra Formation | Egypt | Africa |
| Miocene | Unknown | Egypt | Africa |
| Miocene | Khari Nadi Formation | India | Asia |
| Miocene | Jangadia Locality | India | Asia |
| Miocene | Ohi Formation | Japan | Asia |
| Miocene | Oidawara Formation | Japan | Asia |
| Miocene | Oshimojo Formation | Japan | Asia |
| Miocene | Shuwayr Formation | Oman | Asia |
| Miocene | Rzehakia Formation | Austria | Europe |
| Miocene | Prambachkirchen Beds | Austria | Europe |
| Miocene | Lake Constance Locality | Germany | Europe |
| Miocene | Bolognano Formation | Italy | Europe |
| Miocene | Unknown | Mexico | North America |
| Miocene | Astoria Formation | United States | North America |
| Miocene | Belgrade Formation | United States | North America |
| Miocene | Calvert Formation | United States | North America |
| Miocene | Choptank Formation | United States | North America |
| Miocene | Marks Head Formation | United States | North America |
| Miocene | Pungo River Formation | United States | North America |
| Miocene | Melrose Locality | United States | North America |
| Miocene | Unknown | United States | North America |
| Miocene | Culebra Formation | Panama | North America |
| Miocene | Pirabas Formation | Brazil | South America |
| Miocene | Jimol Formation | Colombia | South America |
| Miocene | Unknown | Colombia | South America |
| Miocene | Chilcatay Formation | Peru | South America |
| Miocene | Tunga Formation | Peru | South America |
| Miocene | Unknown | Peru | South America |
| Miocene | Pungo River Formation | Atlantic Ocean | |
| Oligocene | Yaquina Formation | United States | North America |
| Oligocene | Unknown | Australia | Oceania |

Localities where Otodus chubutensis fossils have been found. With Miocene records in blue and Oligocene records in Orange.

== See also ==
- List of prehistoric fish
- Largest prehistoric animals
