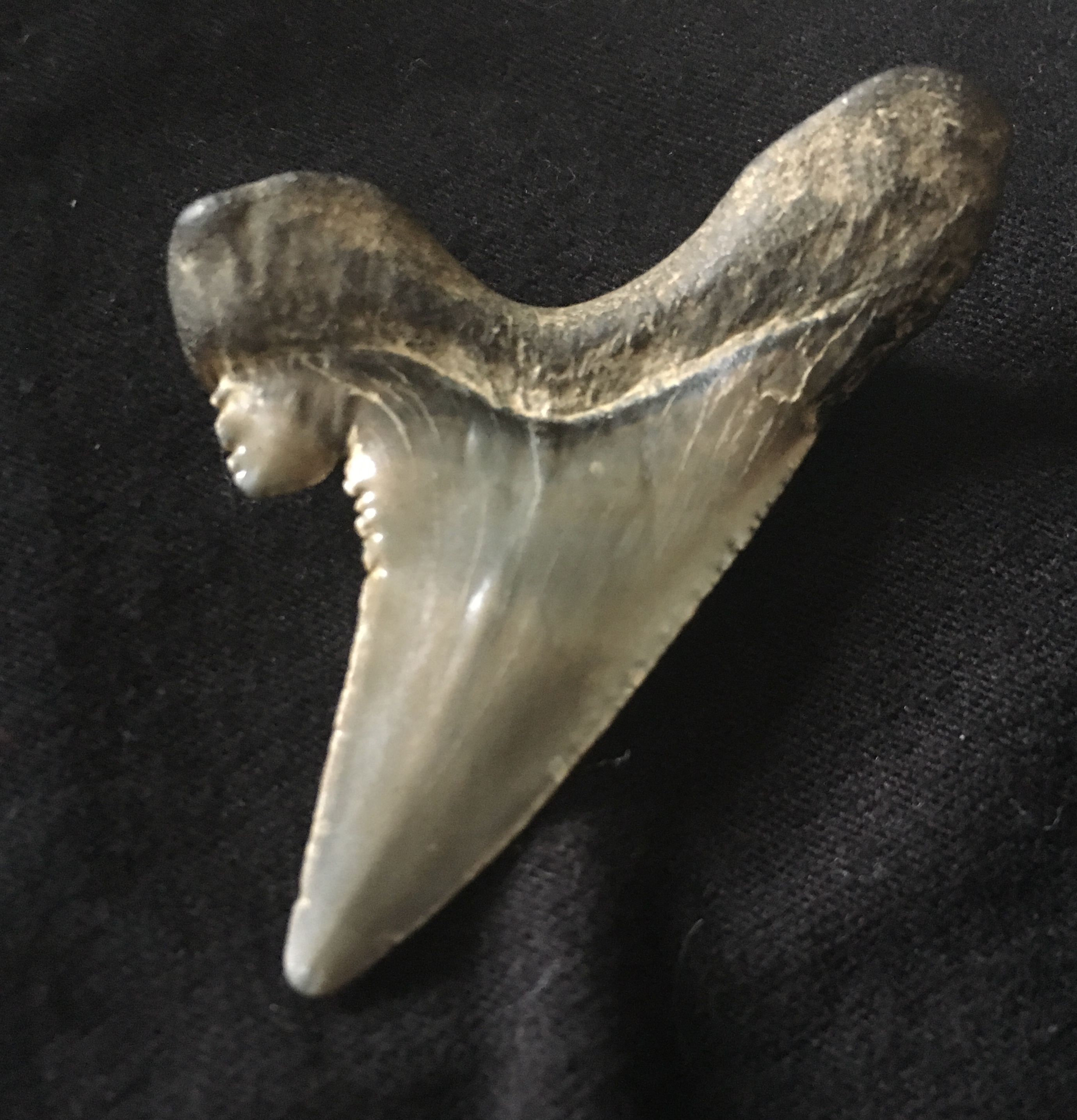
- Otodus aksuaticus tooth from the lower Eocene Nanjemoy Formation of Maryland

Scientific classification
- Kingdom: Animalia
- Phylum: Chordata
- Class: Chondrichthyes
- Subclass: Elasmobranchii
- Division: Selachii
- Order: Lamniformes
- Family: †Otodontidae
- Genus: †Otodus
- Species: †O. aksuaticus

Binomial name
- †Otodus aksuaticus (Menner, 1928)

Synonyms
- Carcharocles aksuaticus (Menner, 1928); Carcharocles toliapicus (Agassiz, 1843); Carcharodon toliapicus (Agassiz, 1843); Otodus toliapicus (Agassiz, 1843); Otodus subserratus? (Agassiz, 1843)

= Otodus aksuaticus =

Otodus aksuaticus Temporal range: Ypresian ~55–49 Ma

Extinct species of shark

Otodus aksuaticus is an extinct species of large shark in the family Otodontidae which may represent a transitional species between Otodus obliquus and Otodus auriculatus. They are similar in overall morphology to Otodus obliquus except they have serrations on their cusps and blade. It is sometimes placed in the genus Otodus. It is mainly found in the Ypresian stage of the Eocene epoch. They have been found in the Woodstock Member of the Nanjemoy Formation of Maryland and Virginia and Ypresian sediments in Aktulagay, Kazakhstan as well as the Ypres clay in Belgium and the London Clay in the United Kingdom.
