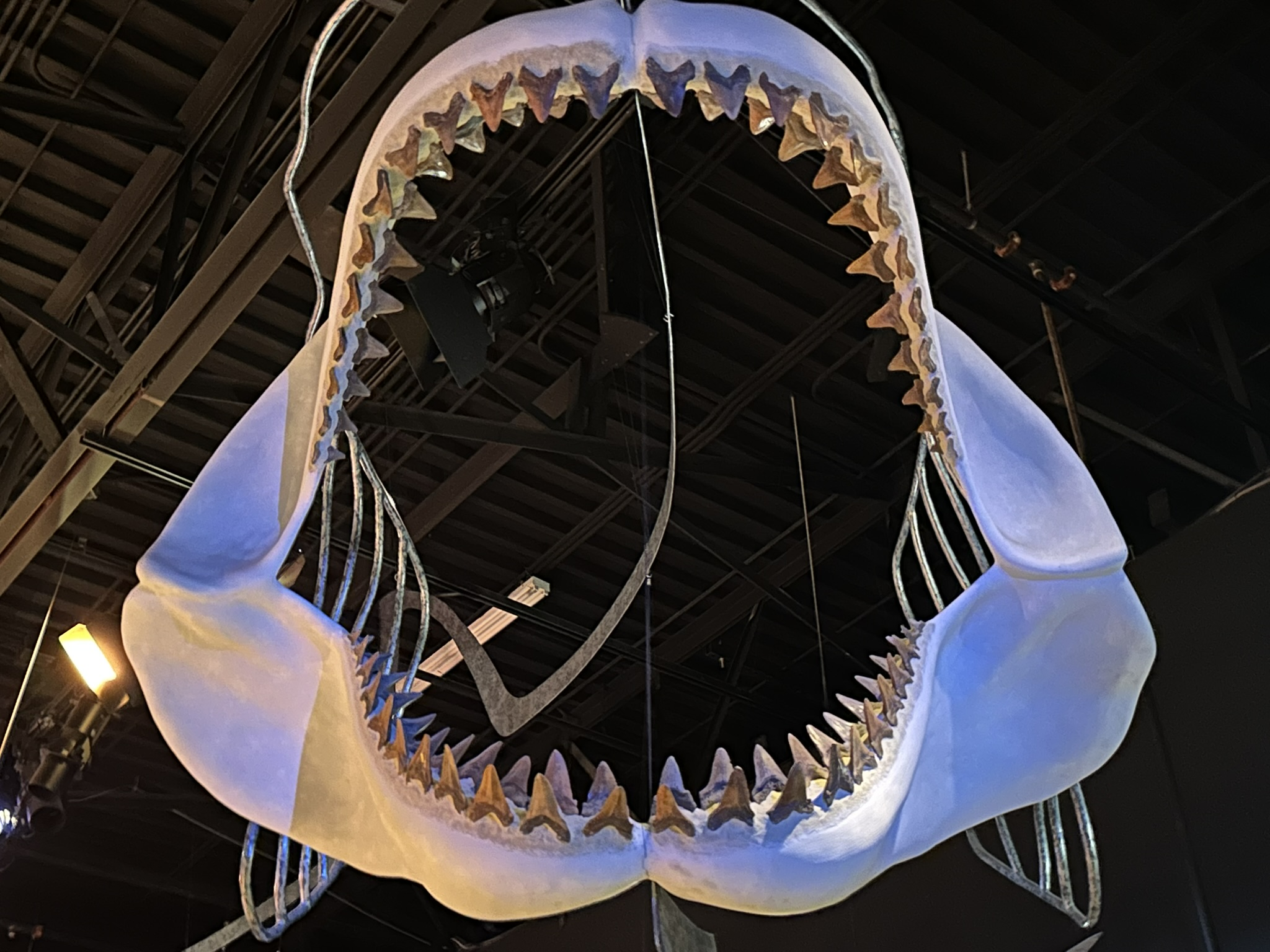
- Reconstructed jaws, Florida Museum of Natural History

Scientific classification
- Kingdom: Animalia
- Phylum: Chordata
- Class: Chondrichthyes
- Subclass: Elasmobranchii
- Division: Selachii
- Order: Lamniformes
- Family: †Otodontidae
- Genus: †Otodus
- Species: †O. angustidens

Binomial name
- †Otodus angustidens Agassiz, 1843

Synonyms
- Carcharocles angustidens: Carcharodon angustidens Agassiz, 1843; Otodus latidens? Agassiz, 1843

= Otodus angustidens =

Otodus angustidens Temporal range: Late Eocene-Early Miocene ~34–21 Ma

Species of fossil shark

Otodus angustidens is an extinct species of prehistoric megatoothed sharks in the genus Otodus, which lived during the Late Eocene and Miocene epochs about 34 to 21 million years ago. The largest individuals were about 11–12 metres (36–39 ft) long. This shark is related to another extinct megatoothed shark, the famous Otodus megalodon.

== Taxonomy ==
The Swiss naturalist Louis Agassiz, first identified this shark as a species of genus Carcharodon in 1843.

In 1964, shark expert, L. S. Glikman recognized the transition of Otodus obliquus to O. auriculatus and moved O. angustidens to genus Otodus. (See "external links" below)

However, in 1987, shark expert H. Cappetta recognized the O. auriculatus - O. megalodon lineage and placed all related megatooth sharks along with this species in the genus Carcharocles. The complete Otodus obliquus to O. megalodon transition then became clear and has since gained the acceptance of many other experts with the passage of time. Within the Otodus lineage, O. angustidens is the species succeeding O. sokolovi and is followed by O. chubutensis.The transition between O. angustidens and O. chubutensis, which began in the late Oligocene, is estimated to have taken a considerable amount of time.

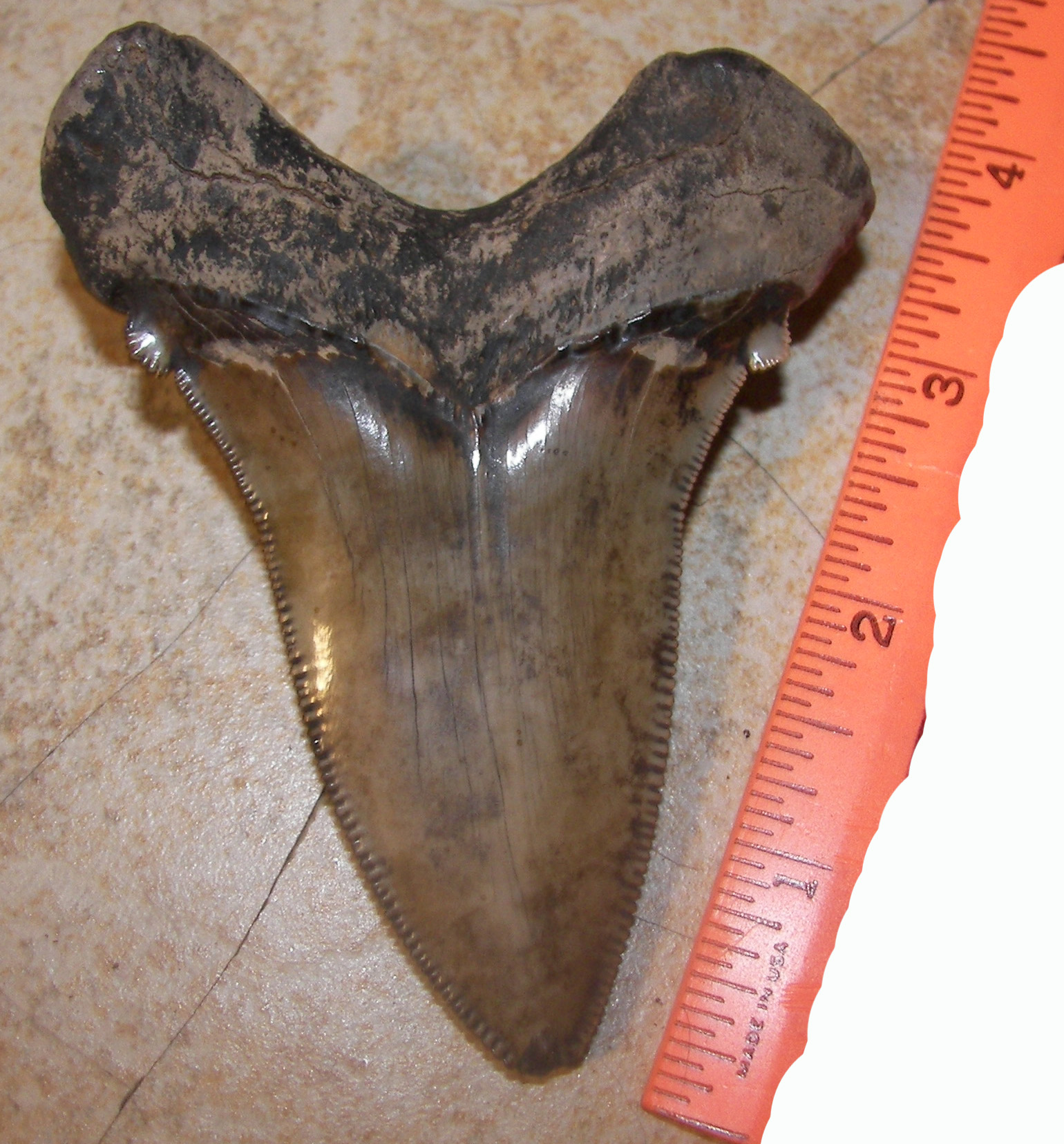
Tooth

In 2001, a discovery of the best preserved Otodus angustidens specimen to date by two scientists, Michael D. Gottfried and Ewan Fordyce, has been presented by the team as evidence for close morphological ties with the extant great white shark, and the team argued that Otodus angustidens, along with all other related megatooth sharks, including Otodus megalodon, should be assigned to Carcharodon as was done before by Louis Agassiz., although this is not internationally accepted by the scientific community.

A more recent study of the taxonomic relationships of the related Megalolamna demonstrates the possibility that Otodus needs to include the species sometimes assigned to Carcharocles (i.e., the megatoothed lineage, including megalodon) in order to be monophyletic.

== Size estimation ==
Known specimens of Otodus angustidens have estimated total body lengths ranging from approximately 8.46–11.22 metres (27.8–36.8 ft), with a conservative, provisional maximum length estimate of around 11.5–12 metres (38–39 ft) long. A well preserved specimen from New Zealand is estimated at 9.3 m (31 ft) in length. This specimen had teeth measuring up to 9.87 cm (3.89 in) in diagonal length, and vertebral centra around 1.10 cm (0.43 in) in diameter. Smaller individuals were about 6–6.6 metres (20–22 ft) long, still larger than the average extant great white shark.

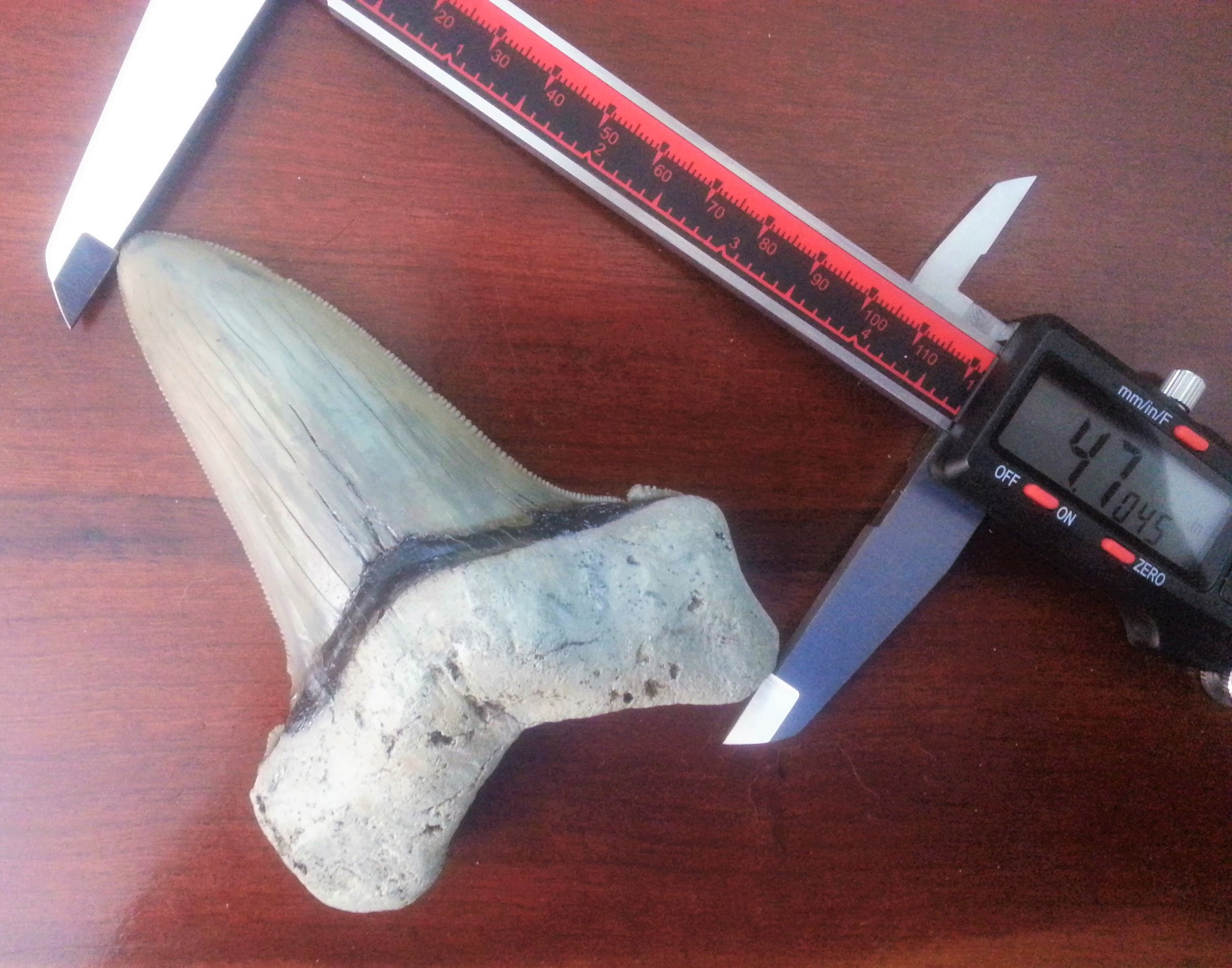
Tooth of O. angustidens

== Dentition ==
The dental formula for O. angustidens is 2.1.5.43.0.6.3

== Diet ==
O. angustidens was an apex predator and likely preyed upon penguins, fish, dolphins, and baleen whales.

== Fossil record ==
As is the case with most extinct sharks, this species is also known from fossil teeth and some fossilized vertebral centra. Shark skeletons are composed of cartilage and not bone, and cartilage rarely gets fossilized. Hence, fossils of O. angustidens are generally poorly preserved. To date, the best preserved specimen of this species have been excavated from New Zealand, which comprises 165 associated teeth and about 35 associated vertebral centra. This specimen is around 26 million years old. O. angustidens teeth are noted for their triangular crowns and small side cusps that are fully serrated. The serrations are very sharp and very well pronounced. O. angustidens was a widely distributed species with fossils found in: A fossil bed in South Carolina suggests that O. angustidens utilized the area as a birthing ground and nursery for their pups, as 89% of the teeth found in the area belonged to juveniles, 3% belonged to infants, and 8% belonged to adults.Entering the early Miocene, there are many instances where the fossils of O. chubutensis and Megalodon overlap in age.

North America

- Yazoo Formation, Alabama
- Jewett Sand Formation, California
- Clinchfield Formation, Georgia
- Calvert Formation, Maryland
- Jackson Group, Mississippi
- Kirkwood Formation, New Jersey
- Castle Hayne Formation, North Carolina
- Hawthorne Formation, South Carolina
- Chandler Bridge Formation, South Carolina

Europe

- Malta
- Paris Basin, France
- Leipzig / Stoermthal, Germany

Asia

- Ashiya Group, Japan
- Bhuban Formation, India

Oceania

- Ettric, Jan Juc, Gambier Limestone, Clifton Formations, Australia
- Otekaike Formation, New Zealand

Africa

South America

- Dos Bocas Formation, Ecuador

== See also ==
- Prehistoric fish
- Largest prehistoric organisms
