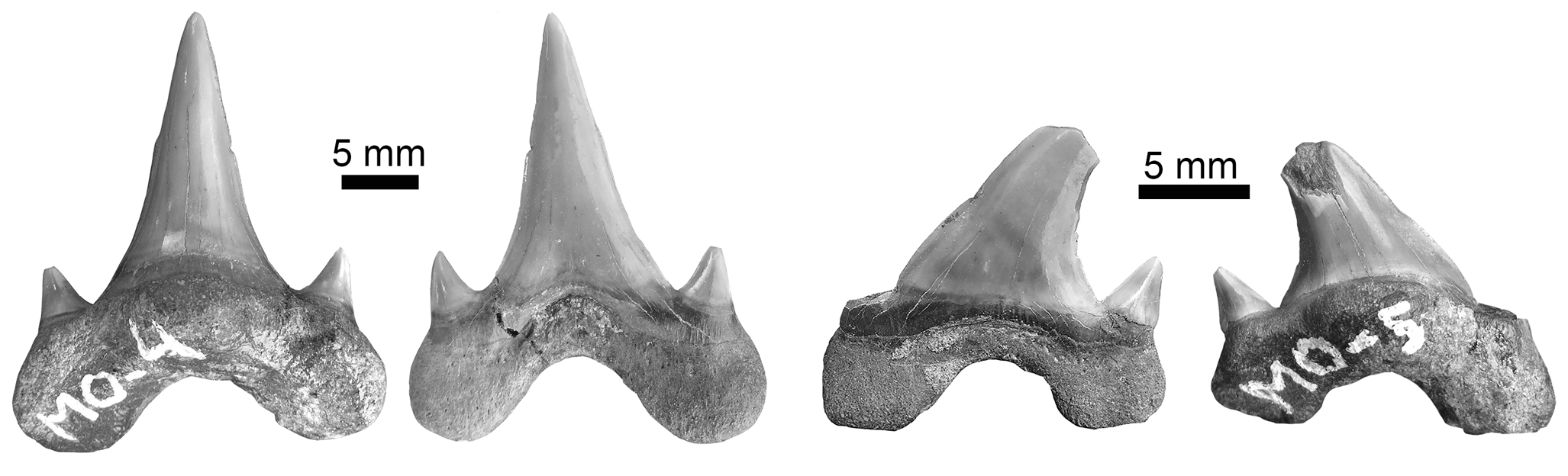
- Fossil teeth from the Dos Bocas Formation, Ecuador

Scientific classification
- Kingdom: Animalia
- Phylum: Chordata
- Class: Chondrichthyes
- Subclass: Elasmobranchii
- Division: Selachii
- Order: Lamniformes
- Family: †Otodontidae
- Genus: †Megalolamna; Shimada et al., 2016
- Species: †M. serotinus

Binomial name
- †Megalolamna serotinus (Probst, 1879)

Synonyms
- List: Otodus serotinus Probst, 1879; Lamna bassanii Alessandri, 1897; Odontaspis taurus obliqua Caretto, 1972; Megalolamna paradoxodon Shimada et al., 2016

= Megalolamna =

Megalolamna Temporal range: Late Oligocene to Middle Miocene, 23.5–15 Ma

Extinct genus of sharks

Megalolamna is an extinct genus of large mackerel shark that lived approximately 23.5 to 15 million years ago (Mya), from the Late Oligocene to the Middle Miocene epochs. Fossils belonging to this genus are known from the Americas, Europe and Japan, and have been documented in scientific literature since the late 19th century. It was in 2016 that the fossils were described as belonging to the same distinct taxon called M. paradoxodon. However, a 2024 study reveals that the taxon was already described indirectly in 1879 under the name Otodus serotinus, the only known species of this genus then being renamed as M. serotinus. It is a member of the Otodontidae, a family of large-toothed sharks known to include the contemporary megalodon.

Although having a maximum length estimated at 5.1 m (17 ft), a measurement similar to that of the current great white shark, Megalolamna would have only fed on medium-sized prey. The front teeth of Megalolamna would have had the function of seizing the prey, before cutting it using the lateral teeth located at the corner of the mouth. Fossils proves that the genus had a cosmopolitan distribution and show that it inhabited mainly in shallow environments from tropical to mid-latitude areas.

== Discovery and naming ==
During the 20th and 21st centuries, several fossil shark teeth dating from the Lower Miocene were discovered in the Americas and Japan. In the scientific literature, these same teeth were classified in different genus or are noted as having indeterminate generic position, but all authors recognized them as coming from the order Lamniformes. It is on the basis of many unifying common points that the new genus and species Megalolamna paradoxodon is described by Japanese paleontologist Kensu Shimada and his colleagues in 2016 from five isolated fossil teeth having been discovered in the United States, Japan and Peru. The genus name Megalolamna derives from the Ancient Greek word μεγάλος (megálos, "big"), in combination with Lamna, type genus of Lamniformes. The specific name parodoxodon comes from the Latin paradoxum, "paradox", and the Ancient Greek ὀδούς (odoús, "tooth"), and refers to what the authors describe as "its paradoxical appearance of teeth". Shimada detailed the etymological meaning of this scientific name in a press release accompanying the official description. The genus name Megalolamna is named because of its phylogenetic proximity to other megatoothed sharks such as the megalodon, but its combination with Lamna was chosen because of the superficial resemblance of its teeth to those of the salmon shark. The specific name refers to his still unresolved great temporal gap with Otodus. The designated holotype of the genus is a complete tooth cataloged as UCMP 112146, having been discovered in Kern County, California.

Earlier the same year, Jorge D. Carrillo-Briceño and colleagues described a set of teeth that had been discovered in the Guajira Peninsula, northern Colombia. Among these fossils is an isolated tooth which the authors attribute to an undetermined genus of lamniform sharks. They also refer to this same indeterminate taxon of teeth discovered in Austria, Switzerland, Germany, Sardinia, Peru, the East Coast of the United States and Maryland, where they are noted as very abundant. In notes added to their study, Shimada and his colleagues attribute the Colombian tooth to the taxon then erected, and also suggest that it is likely that the teeth discovered in the previously mentioned localities would then expand the geographical record of this shark, although they are skeptical about the abundance of Maryland fossils. Two subsequent studies published in 2019 and 2020 identify additional Lower Miocene Megalolamna teeth from Peru and Ecuador, respectively.

In 2024, Shimada and colleagues describe three teeth from South Carolina and Maryland. The single tooth from South Carolina extends the taxon's distribution era to the Late Oligocene, at about 23.5 million years ago. The two teeth from Maryland embody the northernmost known occurrences of Megalolamna. The same year, German paleontologist Jürgen Pollerspöck and Shimada describe several additional specimens having been discovered in Europe, more precisely in Austria, France, Germany and Italy. The authors also discover that two teeth discovered in Germany and Italy have already received their respective specific epithets in two works published at the end of the 19th century. The German tooth having been discovered in the east of Baltringen, in the state of Baden-Württemberg, was the first to be named, being originally described in 1879 by Josef Probst as Otodus serotinus. The Italian tooth discovered in Montferrat, in Piedmont, is described in 1897 by Giulio de Alessandri under the name Lamna bassanii. In the description, Alessandri named the taxon in honor of Francesco Bassani, who made a great contribution to the knowledge of Italian paleontology and stratigraphy. These two names were recognized as valid in works published after 1899 and those up to 2006, but no researchers have visibly looked into the potential synonymy between them. The specific epithet serotinus being older than bassanii and parodoxodon, Pollerspöck and Shimada then moved this name to the genus Megalolamna, the taxon then being renamed Megalolamna serotinus according to the ICZN's principle of priority. The two other specific epithets erected since are then put into synonymy.

== Description ==
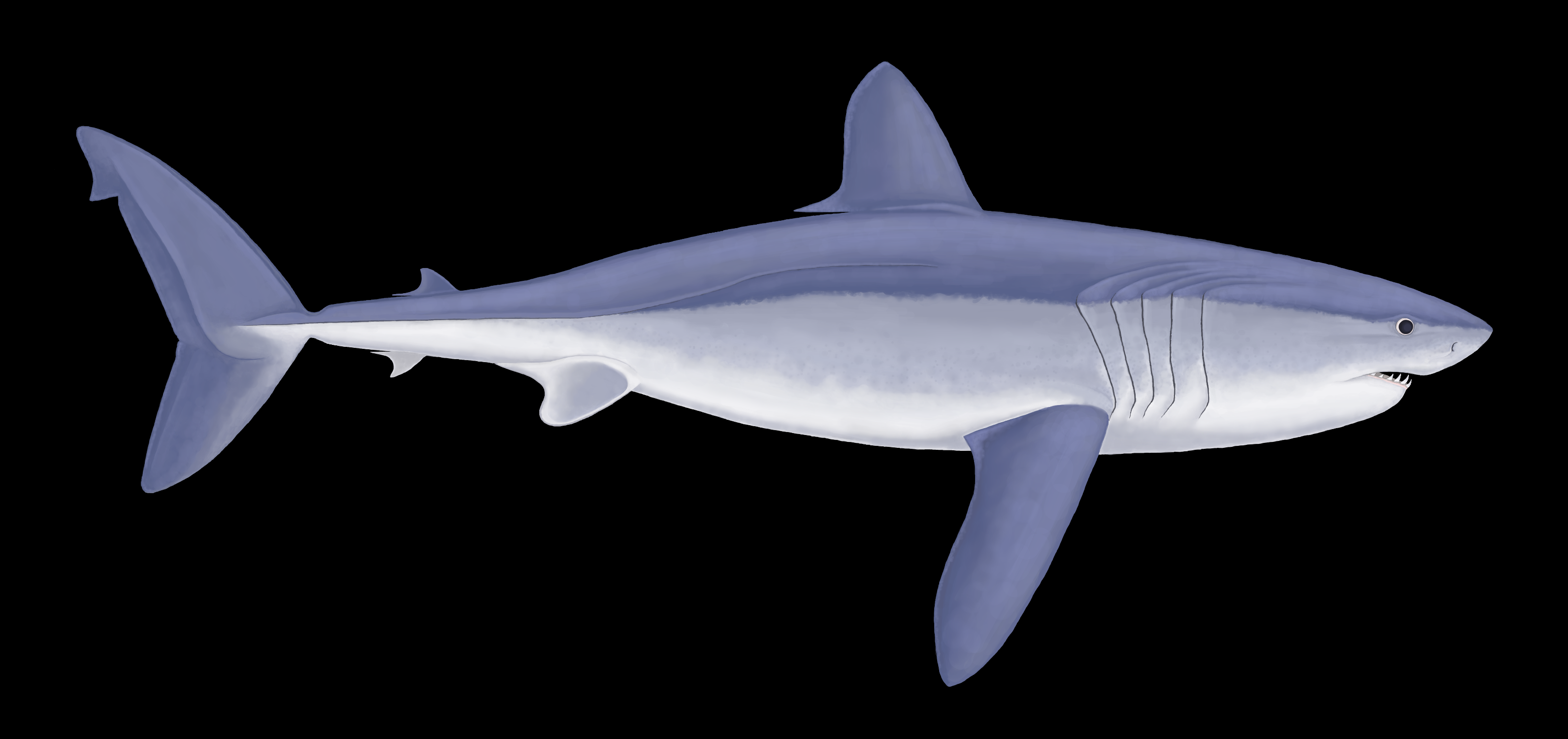
Hypothetical life restoration

The morphology of Megalolamna being completely unknown with the exception of its teeth, the measurements of the latter are used by Shimada et al. (2016) with those of several other lamniform sharks in order to calculate an overall estimate of its length. An expanded range gives a size ranging from 3.7 to 19.5 m (12 to 64 ft) long. This range of estimates is nevertheless considered highly exaggerated given that it is based on the common thresher shark, a shark whose tail is as long as its own body and has comparatively smaller teeth. A second, smaller range gives between 3.7 to 7.2 m (12 to 24 ft), calculating an average length of 5.1 m (17 ft) for the largest known specimen, which is a similar size to a typical great white shark.

The teeth of Megalolamna have the basic features of a lamniform, but are mainly distinguished by the presence of a pointed main cusp sometimes inclined laterally, lateral cusplets (small enameled cusps that appear at the base of the tooth's main crown) about equal in size and pointing upwards, and with a strongly bilobed root. The cusps and cusplets are both triangular in shape, and their cutting edges are smooth and razor-shaped. The largest known tooth measures 4.5 cm (1.8 in) in height, while the smallest documented measures 8.2 mm (0.32 in). Although it is very uncertain whether Megalolamna had one or more rows of teeth in the jaws, its teeth show an almost continuous series of dentition ranging from tall, symmetrical teeth to short, sloping teeth, with no notable differences that would indicate their location in the upper or lower jaw. This dentition therefore indicates that the animal should have monognathic heterodonty, i.e. differently shaped mesial (the most forward) and distal (the furthest behind) teeth along the upper or lower jaws.

Megalolamna's dentition is similar to those of most other large lamniform sharks, and its diet is expected to be specialized, having primarily fed on bony fish. However, where large lamniforms have a grasping and ripping type dentition, the lateral teeth of Megalolamna exhibit a cutting function. Thus, the animal probably seized its prey with the front teeth, before cutting it with the lateral teeth located at the corners of the mouth to an acceptable proportion for ingestion. The estimated body length of the animal also indicates that it fed on medium-sized fish, ranging from 0.5 to 1 m (1 ft 8 in to 3 ft 3 in).

== Classification ==
Megalolamna is part of the family Otodontidae, a lineage of lamniform sharks known to notably include the megalodon. The phylogenetic analysis of Shimada et al. (2016) recovers it as the sister taxon of the type genus Otodus. In order to avoid making the genus Otodus paraphyletic, the authors transferred all of the species formerly classified in the genus Carcharocles to this latter. They then discovered that the species of the genus Otodus form an anagenetic sequence which represent different chronospecies. A similar case is also present for Cretalamna, because, being generally seen as an ancestral taxon to Otodus, it is also seen as paraphyletic. The discovery of Megalolamna, which presents dental characteristics similar to theses two genera, however allows Cretalamna and Otodus to remain monophyletic. For classification purposes, they maintain Cretalamna as distinct, but separate it into two lineages representing species dating from the Cretaceous and Cenozoic. The authors note, however, that the fact that Megalolamna and Otodus are related is not without problems, because there is a gap in appearance of about 43 million years each. This phylogenetic positioning then requires more in-depth research on Paleogene sharks as well as in the synapomorphies definable in the different genera of otodontids. The cladogram below is based after the results of Shimada et al. (2016), with the change of the specific epithet following Pollerspöck & Shimada (2024).

- Otodontidae
  - Kenolamna gunsoni
  - - Cretalamna spp.
    - - Megalolamna serotinus
      - Otodus spp.

== Paleoecology ==
Megalolamna fossils proves that the genus had a cosmopolitan distribution. Its distribution occupied in the eastern and western margins of the Pacific Ocean, in the western margin of the Atlantic Ocean, in the Caribbean Sea, in the Mediterranean Sea and the ancient Paratethys Sea. This shows that latitudinalally, Megalolamna occupied tropical to mid-latitude zones in the northern and southern hemispheres. This geographical distribution is quite similar to that of many current lamniforms such as the goblin shark, the megamouth shark or the Bigeye sand tiger. Based on this similarity, Pollerspöck & Shimada (2024) suggest that it is possible that fossils of Megalolamna might be found in the future in the Atlantic coasts of Africa and South America, along the Indian Ocean and Oceania. A large majority of the geological formations from which Megalolamna is documented would have been shallow marine environments, although some fossils also suggest that the animal also lived in cold, subtropical waters.

Select localities where Megalolamna fossils have been found. Legend: Oligocene localities Miocene localities

== See also ==
- Prehistoric fish
- List of prehistoric cartilaginous fish
