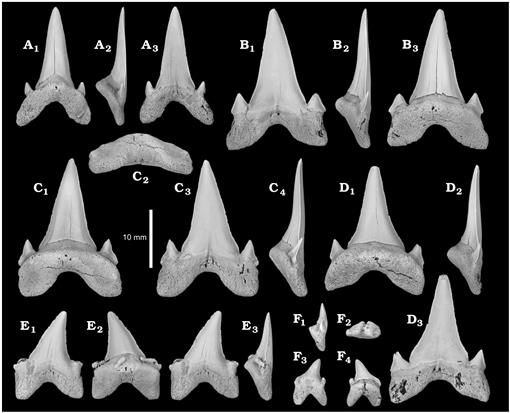
- Kenolamna gunsoni from Gearle Siltstone of Australia

Scientific classification
- Kingdom: Animalia
- Phylum: Chordata
- Class: Chondrichthyes
- Subclass: Elasmobranchii
- Division: Selachii
- Order: Lamniformes
- Family: †Otodontidae
- Genus: †Kenolamna; Siversson, 2017

Species
- K. gunsoni

= Kenolamna =

Kenolamna Temporal range: Cenomanian

Extinct genus of Cretaceous Mackerel Shark

Kenolamna is an extinct genus of mackerel shark from the Cretaceous period known only from isolated teeth. It is named in honor of Kenneth McNamara, former curator of Paleontology at the Western Australian Museum. It is tentatively placed in the family Otodontidae, and is closest in design to Cretalamna and Paleocarcharodon though it is unclear how closely related it is to either. Currently, it is a monotypic genus containing only the species K. gunsoni.
