= Shark tooth =

Teeth of a shark

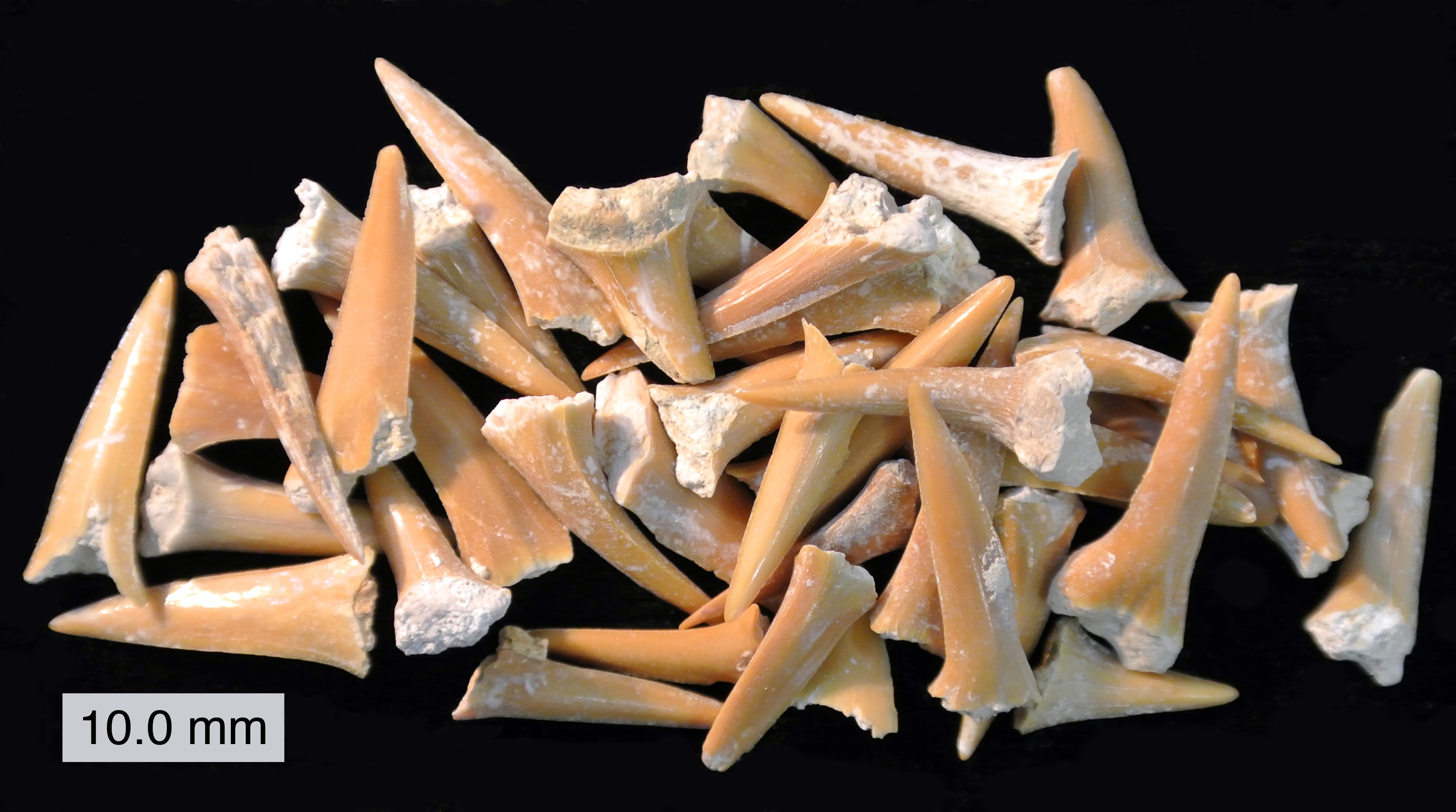
Fossil shark teeth (Cretaceous) from southern Israel

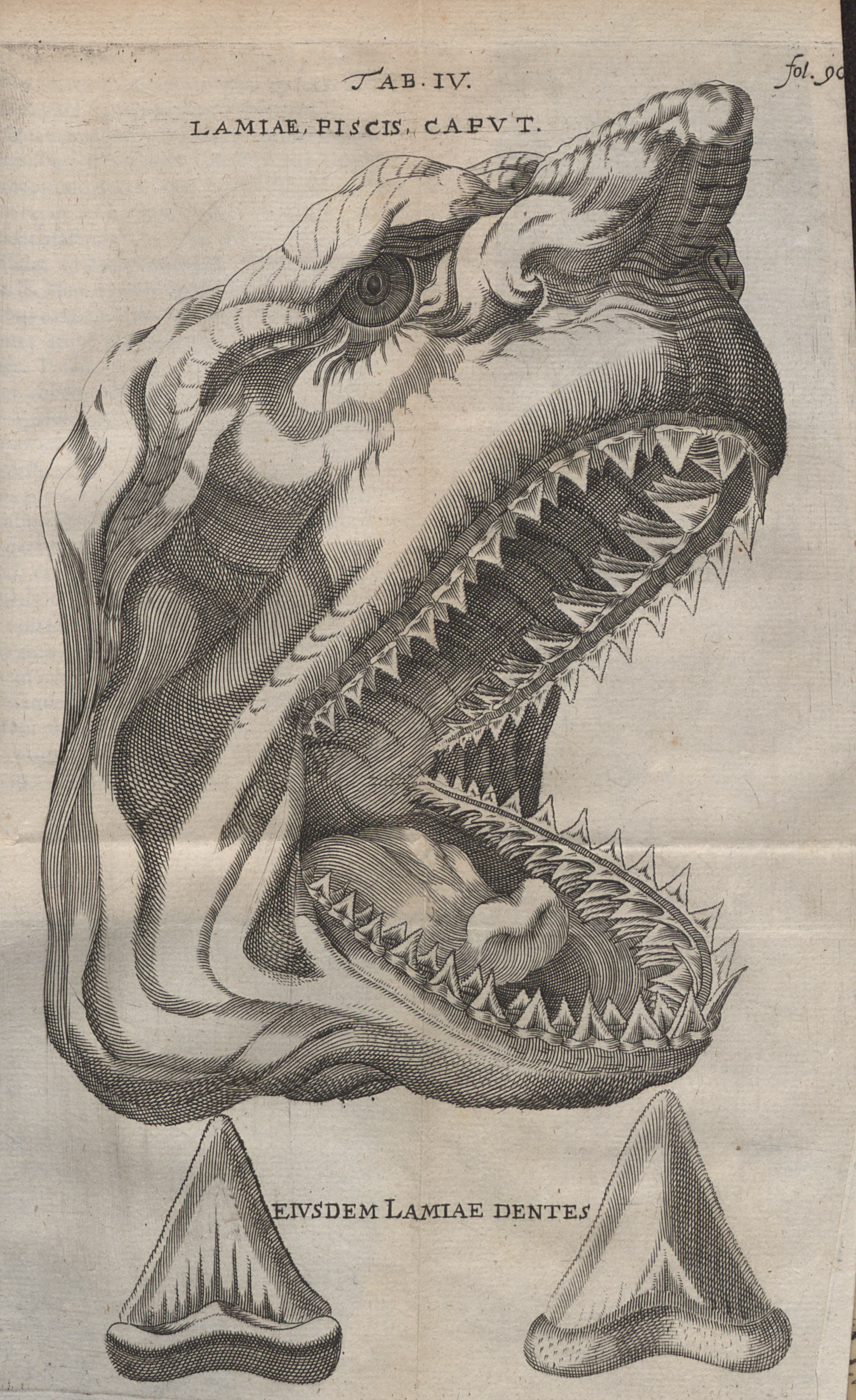
Elementorum myologiae specimen, 1669

Sharks continually shed their teeth; some Carcharhiniformes shed approximately 35,000 teeth in a lifetime, replacing those that fall out. There are four basic types of shark teeth: dense flattened, needle-like, pointed lower with triangular upper, and non-functional. The type of tooth that a shark has depends on its diet and feeding habits.

Sharks are a great model organism to study because they continually produce highly mineralized tissues. Sharks continually shed their teeth and replace them through a tooth replacement system. Through this system, sharks replace their teeth relatively quickly with replacement teeth that are ready to rotate because their teeth often get damaged while catching prey. They will replace teeth that are broken and young sharks can even replace their teeth weekly. Although sharks constantly shed their teeth, factors such as water temperature affect the turnover rate. While warmer water temperatures produced faster rates, cold water temperatures slowed tooth replacement rates in nurse sharks. They are only shed once new teeth are formed underneath and push them out of the connective tissue that was holding them in place. The sex of the shark also plays a role in the development of teeth and the differences in teeth in species due to gender is called sexual heterodonty. Usually, females have larger teeth because on average they are usually larger than males. Also, age can change the shape of teeth in which "juvenile teeth start out more narrow and robust, while adult teeth are broader and thinner".

In some formations, shark's teeth are a common fossil. These fossils can be analyzed for information on shark evolution and biology; they are often the only part of the shark to be fossilized. Fossil teeth comprise much of the fossil record of the Elasmobranchii, extending back to hundreds of millions of years. A shark tooth contains resistant calcium phosphate materials.

The most ancient types of shark-like fish date back to 450 million years ago, during the Late Ordovician period, and are mostly known by their fossilized teeth and dermal denticles. However, the most commonly found fossil shark teeth are from the Cenozoic era (the last 66 million years).

== Types and functions ==
Though sharks often are highly specialized, as a category they have ranged widely in their adaptations. Their teeth reflect this, ranging widely in form and function.

There are a number of common types of shark teeth, that vary according to the diet of the shark. Examples include dense flattened teeth for crushing; long needle-like teeth for gripping; pointed lower teeth for gripping combined with serrated, triangular upper teeth for cutting, and teeth that are tiny, greatly reduced, and non-functional.

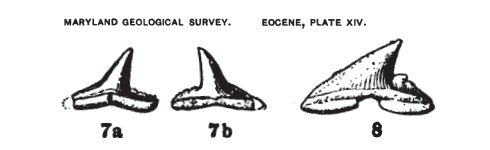
Eastman1901-web

=== Dense flattened teeth ===
Dense flattened teeth are used to crush prey like bivalves and crustaceans. These sharks include nurse sharks and angel sharks. They are typically found at the bottom of the ocean floor.

=== Needle-like teeth ===
This was the first common style of shark tooth, present in the Devonian, four hundred million years ago. Sharks with needle-like teeth commonly feed on small to medium-sized fish, sometimes including small sharks. These teeth are especially effective for such prey because they can easily grip their slippery and narrow bodies. Modern examples include the blue shark and bull sharks. These sharks specifically use their teeth to feed on small prey like squid, flounder, stingrays, and even hammerhead sharks.

=== Pointed lower teeth and triangular upper teeth ===
This combination of pointed lower teeth, with triangular upper teeth are especially useful for cutting prey that consist of large mammals and fish. The combination of teeth entails serrated edges to cut the larger prey into smaller portions in order to easily swallow the pieces. The most famously known shark with these teeth is the great white shark, which feeds on animals such as sea lions, dolphins, other sharks, and even small whales.

=== Non-functional teeth ===
The teeth of plankton-feeders, such as the basking shark and whale shark, are greatly reduced and non-functional. These sharks filter feed on prey by opening their mouths to let tiny organisms get sucked into their mouths to feed without using their teeth at all, instead filtering the food when passing water through their gills. Basking sharks feed by swimming towards their prey with their mouth open and straining their food. Through this process the shark is able to successfully eat hundreds of pounds of zooplankton each day. Whale sharks feed by using rakers on their gill bars and strain them from their gill slits after sweeping krill and other prey into their mouths.

=== Transitional teeth ===
As one species evolves into another, its teeth may become difficult to classify, exhibiting characteristics of both species. (Example: teeth from Otodus auriculatus as it evolved into O. angustidens) are difficult to definitively identify as coming from either species.

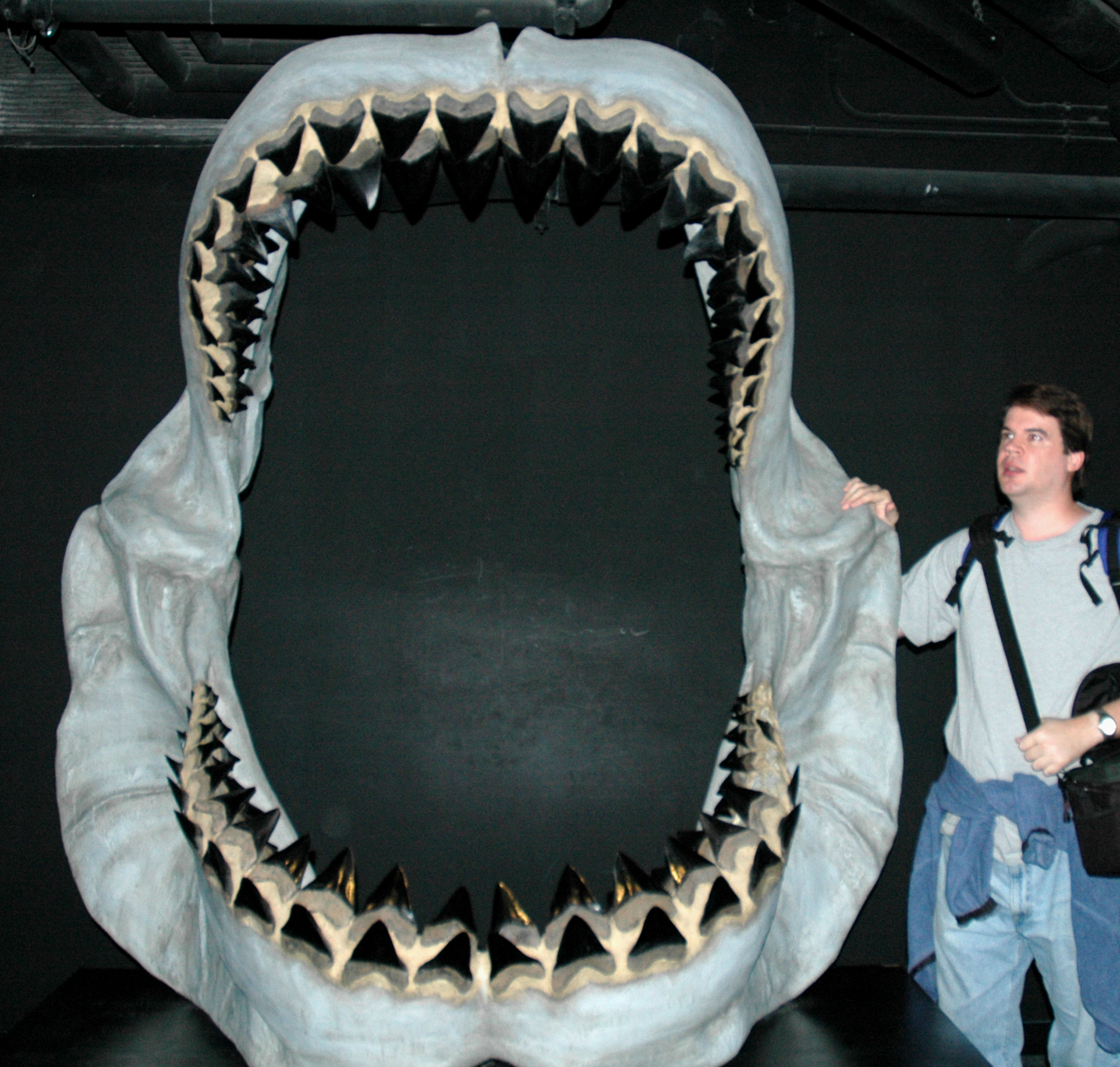
Otodus megalodon fossil shark jaw (reconstruction) (late Cenozoic) 2

A commonly referred to transition is the evolution of Isurus hastalis, the extinct giant mako, into the great white shark, Carcharodon carcharias. There exist teeth that are believed to represent the transition between the two species. These teeth, from Carcharodon sp. are characterised by the wider, flatter crowns of the extinct giant mako. However, they also exhibit partial, fading serrations, which are more pronounced near the root, and disappear towards the tip of the tooth – serrations being found in great whites but not extinct giant makos.

=== Special mention: Megalodon teeth ===
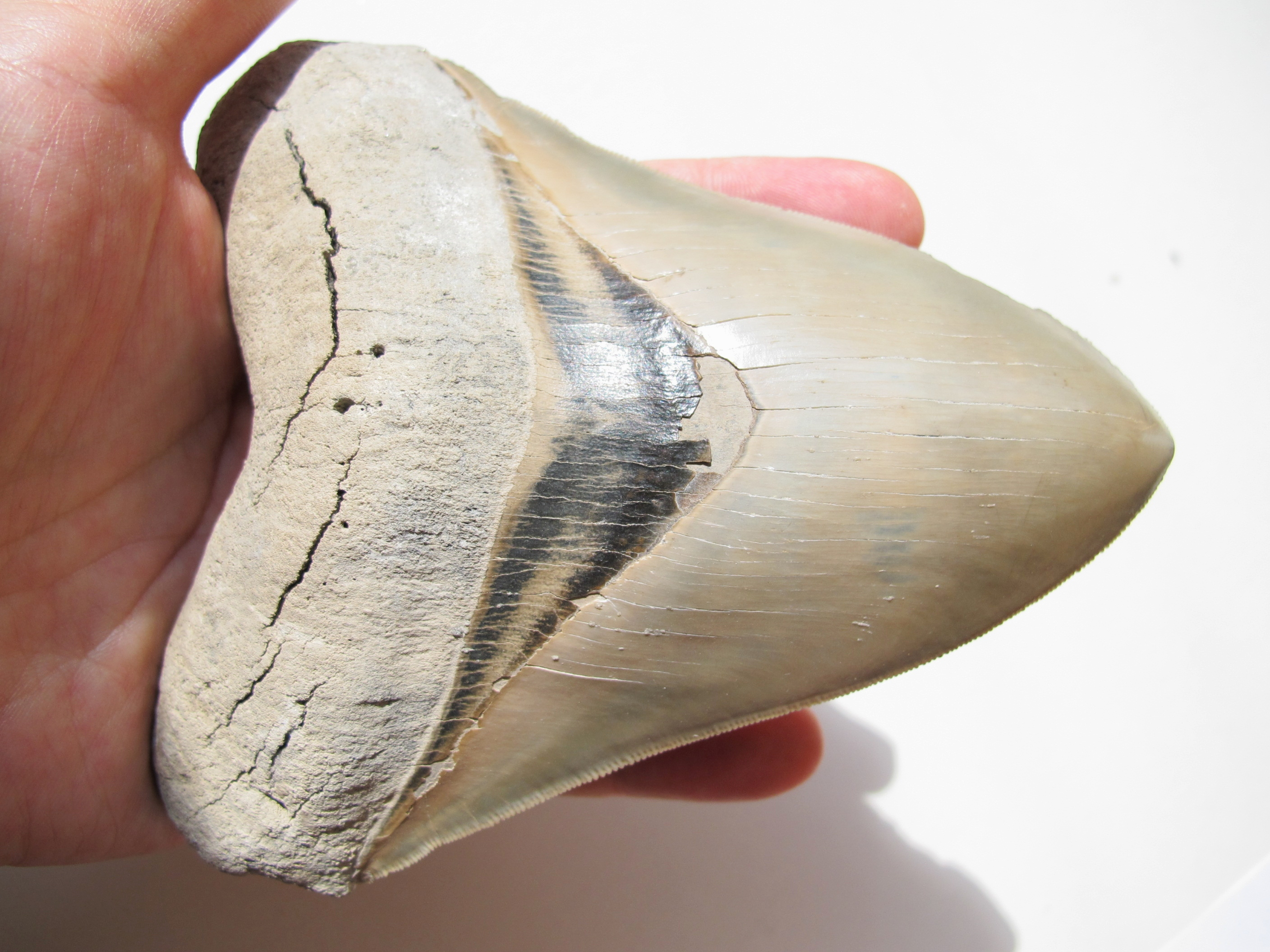
An O. megalodon tooth excavated from Lee Creek Mine, Aurora, North Carolina, United States.

Otodus megalodon teeth are the largest of any shark, extinct or living, and are among the most sought after types of shark teeth in the world. This shark lived during the late Oligocene epoch and Neogene period, about 28 to 1.5 million years ago, and ranged to a maximum length of 60 ft. The smallest teeth are only 1.2 cm (0.5 in) in height, while the largest teeth are in excess of 17.7 cm (7.0 in). The smaller teeth ranging from 3 1/2" and 4 1/2" are more common finds, while teeth over 5", 6", and 7" are more rare. These teeth are in extremely high demand by collectors and private investors, and they can fetch steep prices according to their size and deterioration. The larger teeth can cost as much as 3,000 dollars.

=== Deposits ===
Shark teeth cannot be collected from just any type of rock. Any fossils, including fossil shark teeth, are preserved in sedimentary rocks after falling from their mouth. The sediment that the teeth were found in is used to help determine the age of the shark tooth due to the fossilization process. Shark teeth are most commonly found between the Upper Cretaceous and Tertiary periods. Only after about 10,000 years will a shark tooth fossilize. The teeth commonly found are not white because they are covered with sediment from fossilization. The sediment prevents oxygen and bacteria from attacking and decaying the tooth.

Fossilized shark teeth can often be found in or near river bed banks, sand pits, and beaches. These teeth are typically worn, because they were frequently moved and redeposited in different areas repeatedly before settling down. Other locations, however, yield perfect teeth that were hardly moved during the ages. These teeth are typically fragile, and great care should be taken while excavating them. Phosphate pits, containing mostly fossil bones and teeth, or kaolin pits, are ideal places to look for fossil shark teeth. One of the most notable phosphate mines is in Central Florida, Polk County, and is known as Bone Valley. Most of the teeth found here range from 3 to 10 million years old. Near New Caledonia, up until the practice was banned, fishermen and commercial vessels used to dredge the sea floor for megalodon teeth. In the state of Georgia, shark teeth are found so often that they decided to make shark teeth the official state fossil in 1976.

== Counting ==
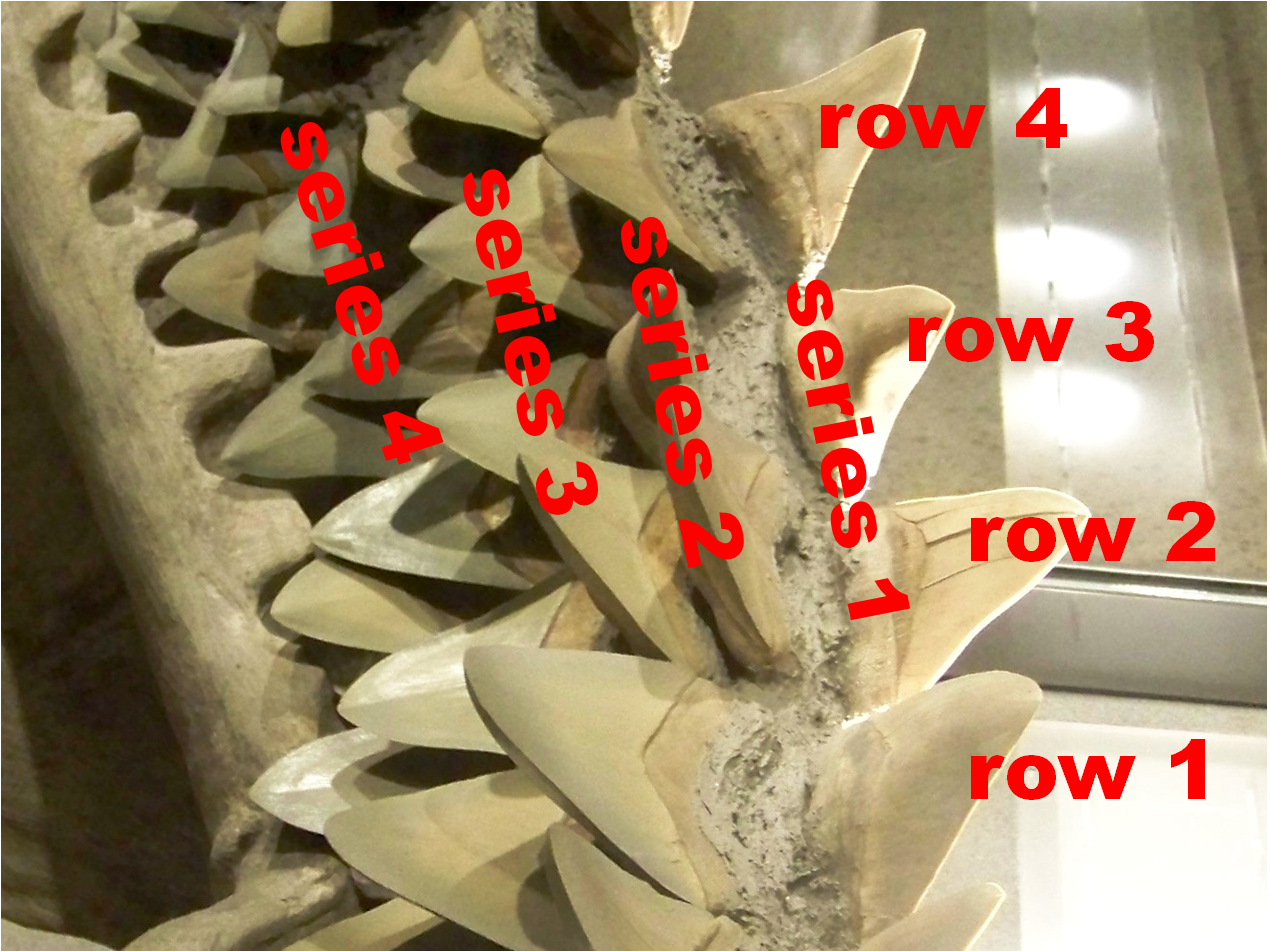
Megalodon lower jaw with 4 tooth rows and 4 tooth series labeled. "Series 1" contains the functional teeth at the front of the jaw.

In taxonomy, shark teeth are counted as follows: rows of teeth are counted along the line of the jaw, while series of teeth are counted from the front of the jaw inward. A single tooth row includes one or more functional teeth at the front of the jaw, and multiple replacement teeth behind this. For example, the jaws of a bull shark can have 50 rows of teeth in 7 series, with the outermost series functional, but most sharks have five series with the average shark having about 15 rows of teeth in each jaw. The small teeth at the symphysis, where the two halves of the jaw meet, are usually counted separately from the main teeth on either side. Sharks are also known to lose at least one tooth per week. Due to their specific arrangement of rows and series however, lost teeth can be replaced within a day.

== Research and identification ==
Identification of most sharks are found through a combination of tooth counts and tooth shapes. Teeth can even lead to the identification of shark species like the requiem shark. The fossilized records of teeth helps illustrate evolutionary history, and isolated teeth are used to study and analyze specific linear measurements of the species. In order to identify teeth and specific information about the teeth, research can be done on a shark tooth. This research may uncover many different aspects about the tooth itself, and the shark species. This proves complicated, however, due to the fact that most fossilized teeth are found mixed and scattered. To collect information on basic-life history and get dispersal estimates of a shark tooth, molecular-based technology is very efficient. To further shark population studies, collection of mtDNA can be extracted from shark jaws and teeth. To study the caries-reducing effect in sharks, studies are done on the fluorine atoms that are bound covalently to calcium atoms in the teeth. Each tooth has a complex fluorapatite structure enameloid. In order to reduce effects of deterioration in the teeth, it is useful to sample only the surface of the enameloid of the tooth for this specific research. Studying and researching shark teeth betters our understandings of shark feeding behaviors, evolutionary changes, and mechanisms. This helps us to identify the teeth, and even the species.

== History of discovery ==
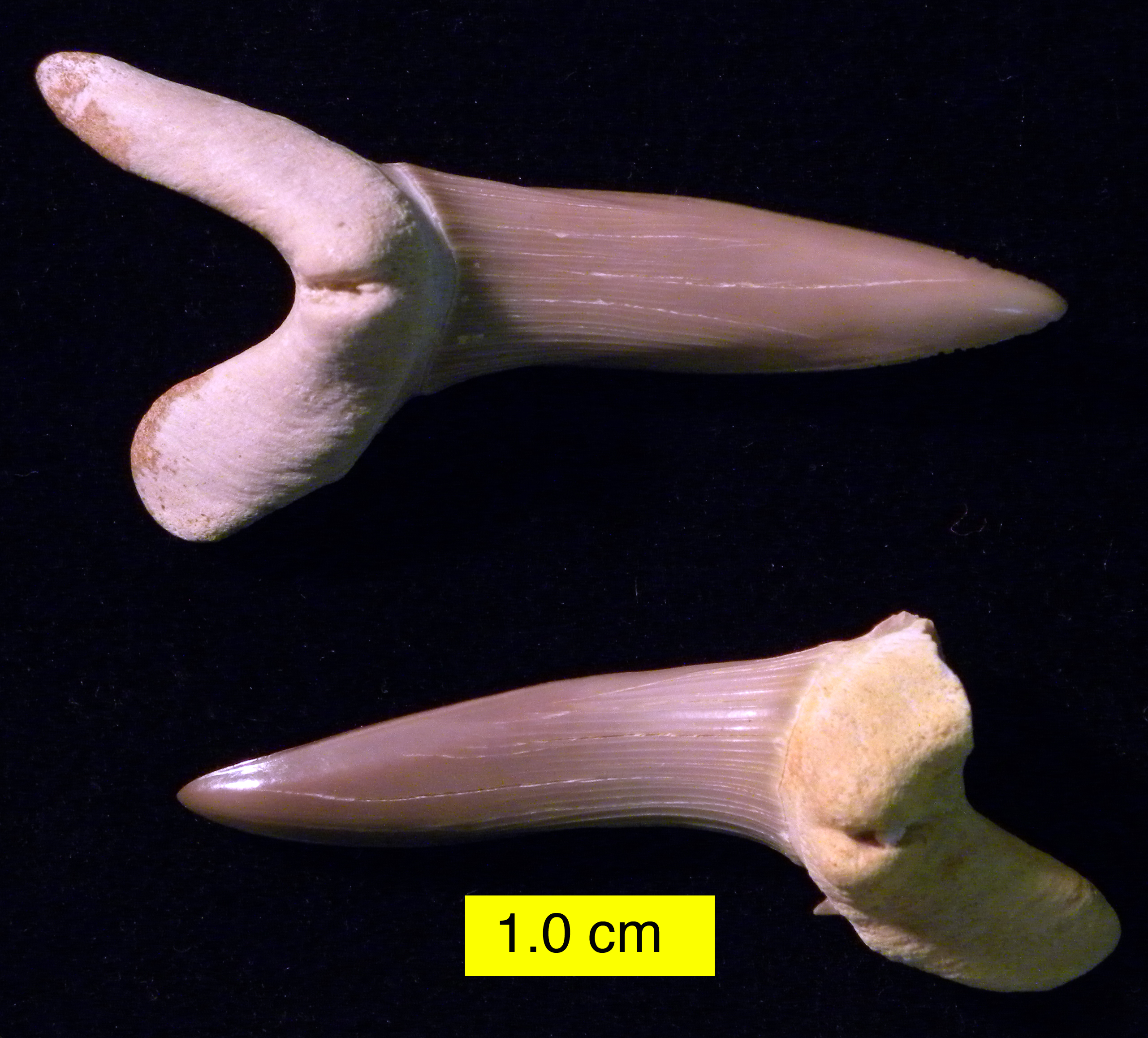
Scapanorhynchus texanus, Menuha Formation (Upper Cretaceous), southern Israel.

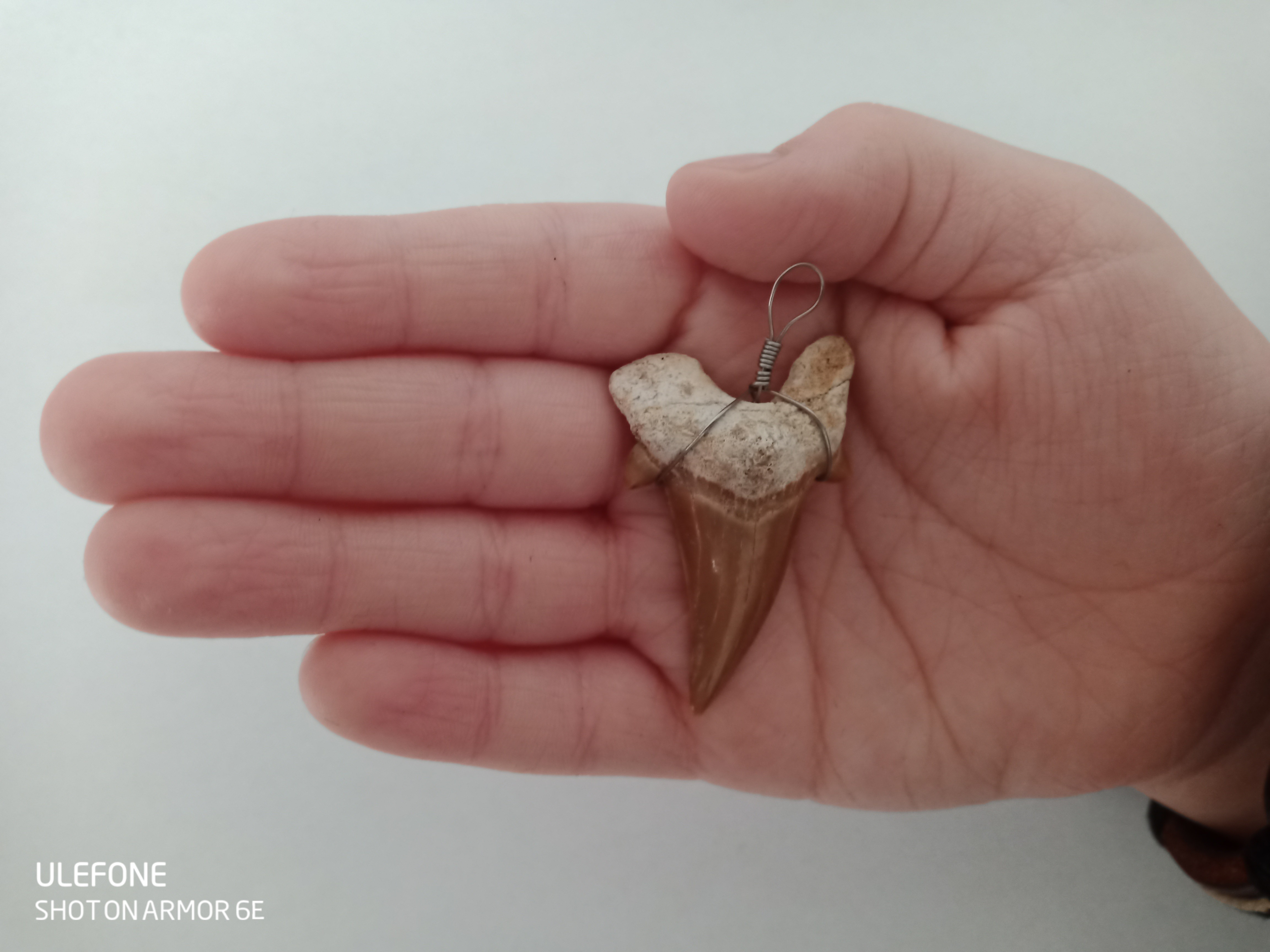
Shark tooth

The oldest known records of fossilized shark teeth are by Pliny the Elder, who believed that these triangular objects fell from the sky during lunar eclipses.

According to Renaissance accounts, large, triangular fossil teeth often found embedded in rocky formations were believed to be petrified tongues of dragons and snakes and so were referred to as "tongue stones" or "glossopetrae". In Malta, where these teeth are found in large numbers, they are linked to the legend of Saint Paul, who is said to have deprived the island's snakes of their venom after being attacked by a viper on his arrival on the island. These teeth are said to represent the apostle's tongue, and are known in Maltese as "Ilsien San Pawl". In German, they are called "Natternzungen" (the tongue of the Natrix, a water snake). Glossopetrae were commonly thought to be a remedy or cure for various poisons and toxins; they were used in the treatment of snake bites. Due to this ingrained belief, many noblemen and royalty wore these "tongue stones" as pendants or kept them in their pockets as good-luck charms.

This interpretation was corrected in 1558 by the Swiss naturalist Conrad Gessner, who wrote about their similarities with shark teeth, in 1611 by the Italian naturalist Fabio Colonna, who demonstrated the organic origins of these rocks, and, in 1667, by the Danish naturalist Nicolas Steno, who discussed their composition and famously produced a depiction of a shark's head bearing such teeth. He mentioned his findings in a book, The Head of a Shark Dissected, which also contained an illustration of a C. megalodon tooth, previously considered to be a tongue stone.

== Tool use by humans ==
Gilbertese weapons edged with shark teeth

In Oceania and America, shark teeth were commonly used for tools, especially on weapons such as clubs and daggers, but also as blades to carve wood and as tools for food preparation, such as the māripi of the Māori. For example, various weapons edged with shark teeth were used by the Native Hawaiians (see example here), who called them leiomano. Some types were reserved for royalty. The Toalean culture of southern Sulawesi in nearby Southeast Asia has evidence of hafted tiger shark teeth blades for ceremonial use dated to the Middle Holocene age.

The Guaitaca (Weittaka) of coastal Brazil tipped their arrows with shark teeth. The remains of shark tooth-edged weapons, as well as chert replicas of shark teeth, have been found in the Cahokia mounds of the upper Mississippi River valley, more than 1,000 km (620 mi) from the ocean. It is reported that the rongorongo tablets of Easter Island were first shaped and then inscribed using a hafted shark tooth.

== See also ==
- Elasmobranch
- Fish jaw
- List of sharks
