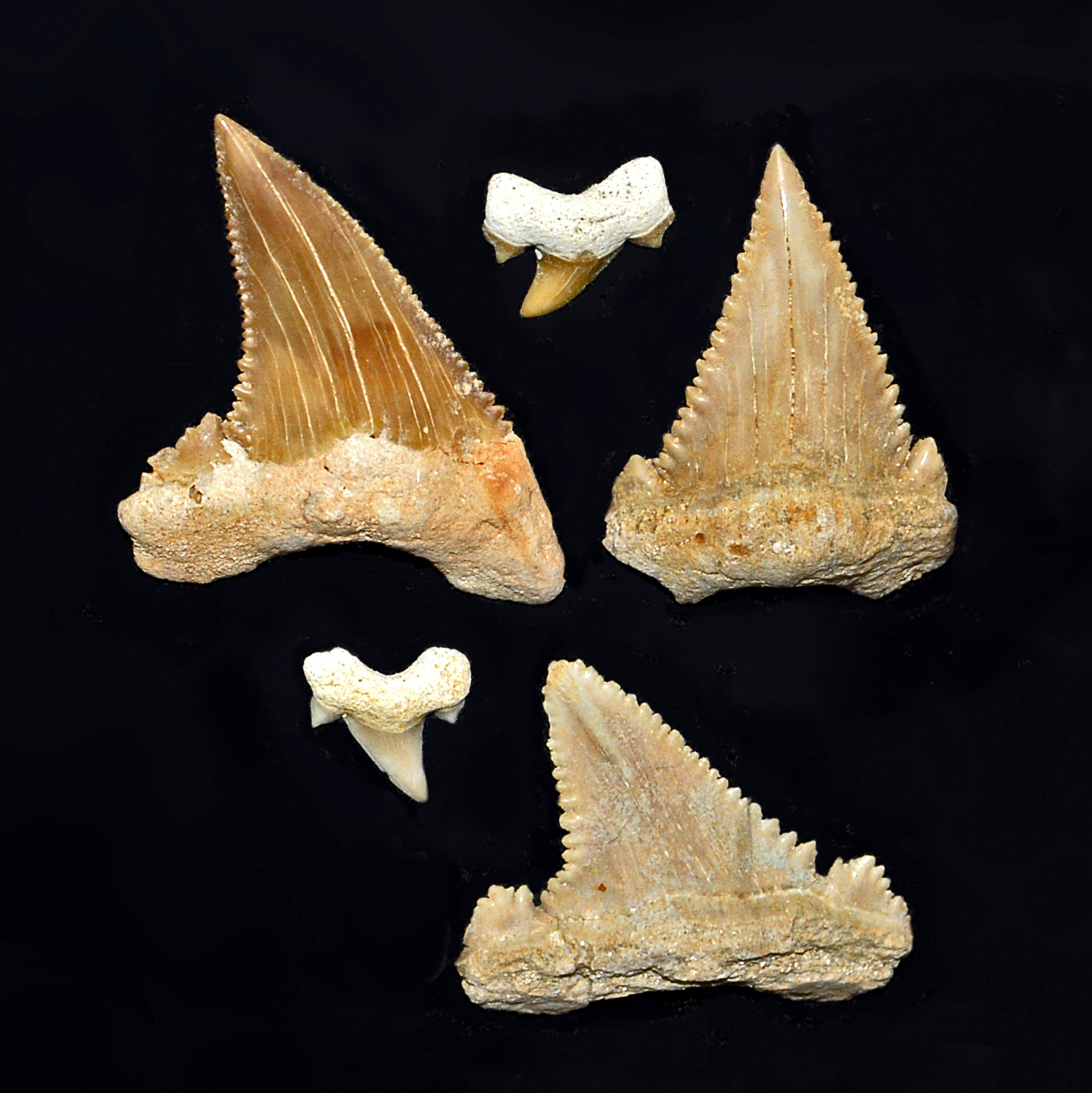
- Fossil teeth of Palaeocarcharodon orientalis (the largest three) from Khouribga (Morocco), alongside teeth of Otodus

Scientific classification
- Kingdom: Animalia
- Phylum: Chordata
- Class: Chondrichthyes
- Subclass: Elasmobranchii
- Division: Selachii
- Order: Lamniformes
- Family: †Otodontidae
- Genus: †Palaeocarcharodon; Casier, 1960

Type species
- †Carcharodon orientalis (Sinzow, 1899)

Species
- †P. orientalis Sinzow, 1899; †P. landanensis? Sinzow, 1899

Synonyms
- Carcharodon orientalis? Sinzow, 1899; Palaeocarcharodon landanensis? (Casier, 1960); Carcharodon landanensis? Leriche, 1942

= Palaeocarcharodon =

Palaeocarcharodon Temporal range: Middle Paleocene–Early Eocene, 61.7–55.8 Ma

Extinct genus of sharks

Palaeocarcharodon, also known as the pygmy white shark, is a genus of shark within the family Cretoxyrhinidae, that lived about 61.7 to 55.8 Ma during the Middle Paleocene and Early Eocene. It currently contains a sole species P. orientalis. An additional species, P. landanensis, is now considered a possible synonym of P. orientalis.

== Taxonomy ==
=== History ===
As is the case with most sharks, the classification of Palaeocarcharodon is still debated. Sinzow (1899) named the shark as a new species of the genus Carcharodon, as C. orientalis, since the teeth were serrated and had features similar to those of the modern Great white shark (Carcharodon carcharias). In addition to C. orientalis, another very close species was suggested, C. landanensis, which would have more serrations on the teeth, with the cusps more reduced or almost vestigial, being found in more recent layers in Morocco and Europe, while C. orientalis was found in intermediate or recent layers. However, soon after, in 1960 it was suggested that "C." orientalis and "C." landanensis would belong to a new genus, Palaeocarcharodon.

In 2013, it was suggested that P. landanensis could be a senior synonym of P. orientalis, among other older articles, since many of the proposed differences between the two were inconsistent or appeared in some specimens of P. orientalis. However, this idea is still debated, as many of these articles were not peer-reviewed, though the current consensus is that P. orientalis is the only valid and definitive species of the genus, with new species potentially existing, but still under debate. In the same year, it was theorized that Palaeocarcharodon was a member of Otodontidae, however, currently many recent papers place it in the family Cretoxyrhinidae.

Some teeth found in Russia, in Volgograd, show Palaeocarcharodon without serrations, usually classified as Palaeocarcharodon cf. orientalis or Palaeocarcharodon sp.

== Description ==
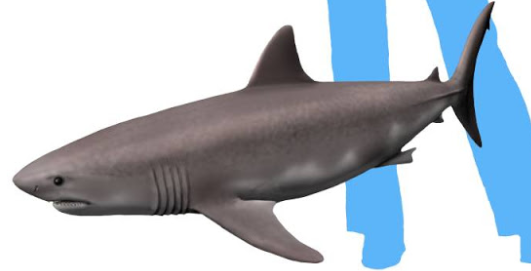
Size compared to human

Like most prehistoric sharks, Palaeocarcharodon has an uncertain size, but it is estimated that it was comparable in size to mako sharks or the modern great white shark. Teeth of Palaeocarcharodon are triangular, labio-lingually compressed, with quite irregular serrations and serrate lateral cusplets. They can reach a size of about 3–6 centimetres (1.2–2.4 in).

== Distribution ==
Like most sharks, Palaeocarcharodon had a body made primarily of cartilage, not bone, currently being known by a few possible vertebrae and several teeth. Fossils of Palaeocarcharodon have been found in the Americas, Asia, Russia, North Africa, and Europe.
