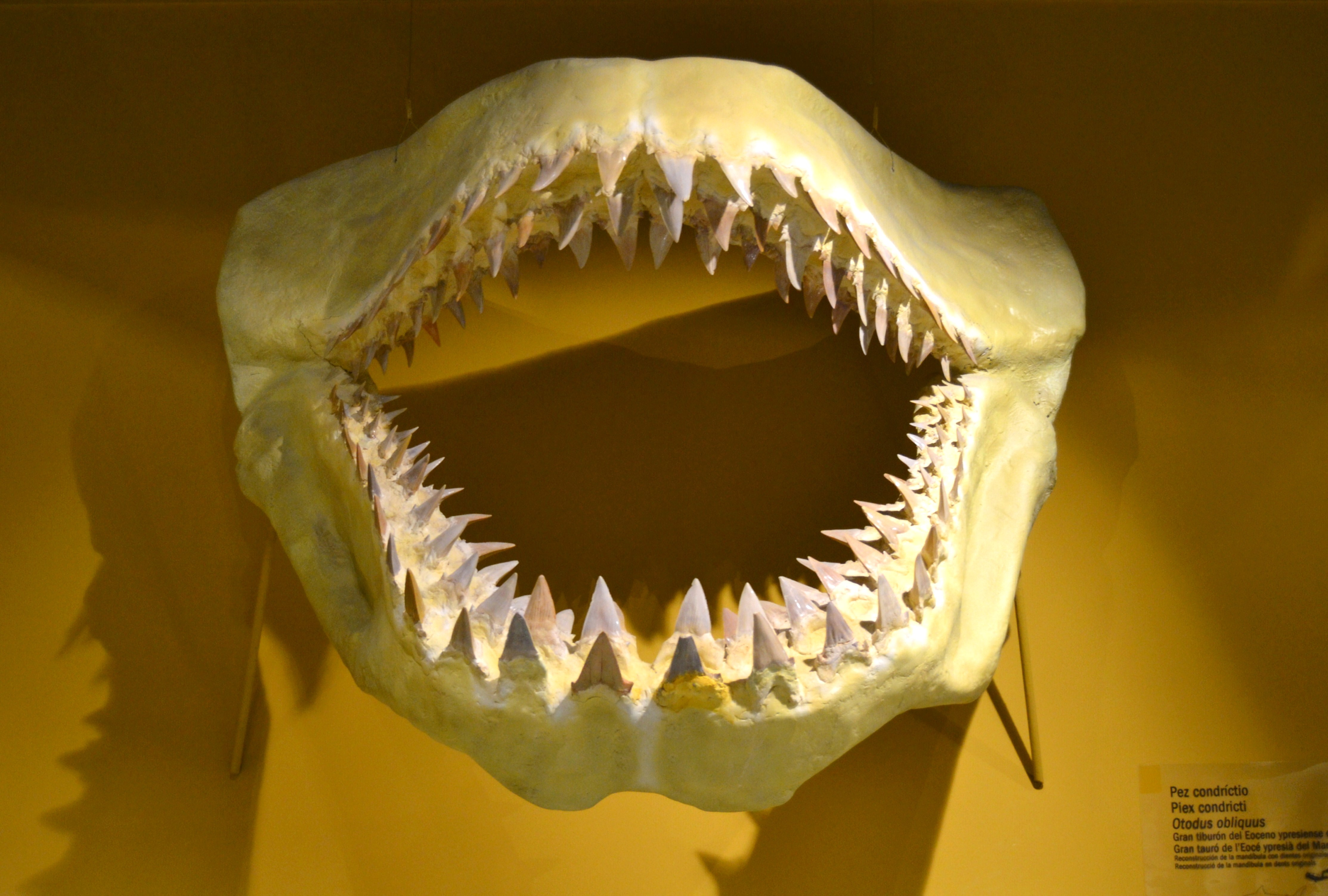
- Jaws of O. obliquus

Scientific classification
- Kingdom: Animalia
- Phylum: Chordata
- Class: Chondrichthyes
- Subclass: Elasmobranchii
- Division: Selachii
- Order: Lamniformes
- Family: †Otodontidae
- Genus: †Otodus
- Species: †O. obliquus

Binomial name
- †Otodus obliquus Agassiz, 1843

Synonyms
- Lamna obliqua? (Agassiz, 1838); Otodus lanceolatus (Agassiz, 1843); Otodus giganteus (Agassiz, 1843); Carcharodon giganteus (Agassiz, 1843)

= Otodus obliquus =

Otodus obliquus Temporal range: Early Paleocene-Early Eocene, 65–54 Ma

Extinct species of shark

Otodus obliquus is an extinct species of large mackerel shark that lived in Early Paleocene to Early Eocene, between 65 and 54 million years ago. It is considered one of first members of Otodus sharks and the type species of genus. It is considered the ancestor of the famous giant mackerel shark, Megalodon. The largest individuals would have measured 8–9 metres (26–30 ft) long.

== Taxonomy ==
=== History ===
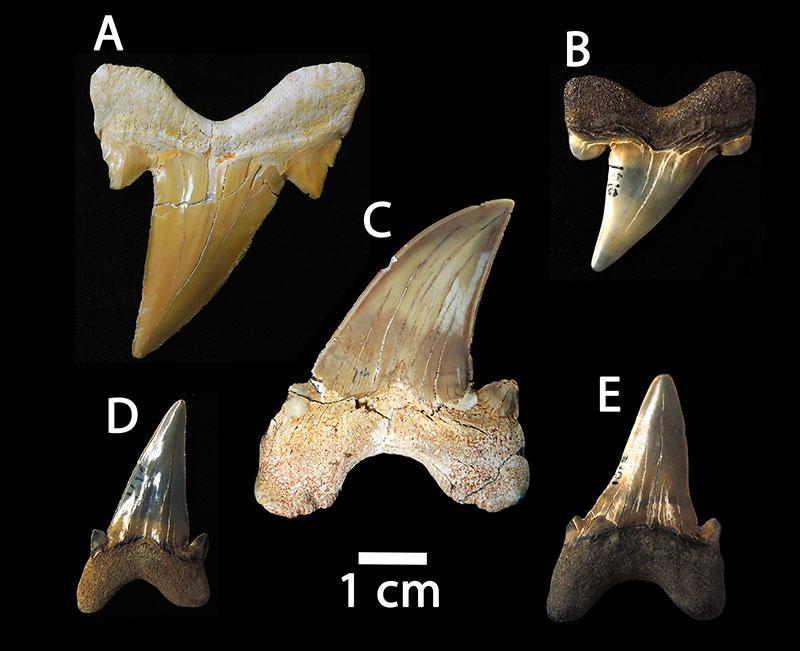
Teeth of O. obliquus and O. "lanceolatus".

As is the case with most sharks of the genus Otodus, the history of classification of O. obliquus is still a subject of debate. In 1838, the naturalist Louis Agassiz named O. obliquus as a species of the genus Lamna, naming it L. obliqua. However, about 5 years after its naming, Louis Agassiz reclassified the same shark into a new genus, Otodus, but still within the same family, Lamnidae. In the same year, he renamed several other species of sharks previously classified in the genus Lamna and Carcharodon, such as O. lanceolatus and O. giganteus. However, in 1942, Maurice Leriche reclassified O. giganteus as a junior synonym of O. obliquus. In 1923 it was suggested that Megalodon and many of its relatives be moved to the genus Carcharocles, with its family still uncertain. In 1964, the paleontologist Glickman grouped Otodus obliquus, Carcharocles megalodon, C. subauriculatus and C. chubutensis in the now extinct family Otodontidae, moving C. megalodon, C. subauriculatus and C. chubutensis to a new genus, Megaselachus.

=== Current classification ===
In most recent studies, O. obliquus is grouped in the family Otodontidae, along with its closest relatives, such as O. megalodon and O. auriculatus for example, currently with the most widely accepted classification placing them in the genus Otodus, with mostly older, alternate classifications placing them in the genus Carcharocles. O. obliquus and O. megalodon bear similarities to modern lamnids including the modern Salmon shark (Lamna ditropis) and the modern Great white shark (Carcharodon carcharias), is, according to current research, due to evolutionary convergence, which is when two unrelated groups or species develop similar appearances and anatomy due to similar evolutionary pressures.

Although the afforementioned otodontids shared certain characteristics with the modern Great white shark, the sharks considered the true ancestors of the modern Great white shark are members of the genus Carcharodon such as Carcharodon hastalis, Carcharodon plicatilis, and C. hubbelli, instead of Otodus.

== Description ==
=== Size ===
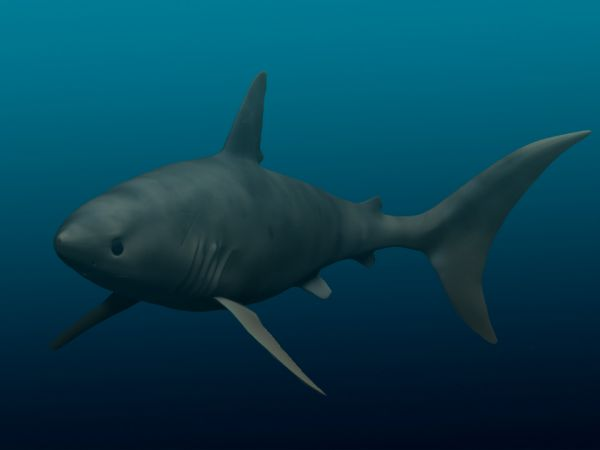
Life restoration of O. obliquus

Similar to other members of the genus Otodus, O. obliquus was a very large species of shark, with a maximum length estimates from 8 to 9 metres (26 to 30 ft). A sexually mature individual of O. obliquus would have measured about 4 m (13 ft) long.

== Paleoecology ==
=== Diet ===
Otodus obliquus was likely an apex predator, hunting large fish, turtles, other sharks, and small species of early cetaceans.

== Distribution ==
Like all sharks, the body of O. obliquus was made of cartilage, not bones, therefore, most of the fossils of O. obliquus are known only by teeth and some vertebrae. Fossils of O. obliquus have been found almost all over the world, having a cosmopolitan distribution, from the Americas to Asia.

Regions where fossils of Otodus obliquus have been discovered
Epoch	Formation	State/Region	Continent
Eocene	Landana Formation	Angola	Africa
Paleocene	Jebel El Onk mine Locality (Note: Alternatively known as Djebel Onk)	Algeria	Africa
Paleocene	Landana Formation	Angola	Africa
Paleocene	Mandarim Beds	Angola	Africa
Paleocene	Mzandi Beds	DRC	Africa
Paleocene	Sidi-Daoui Beds	Morocco	Africa
Paleocene	Tabligo Quarry Locality	Togo	Africa
Paleocene	Akzhar Formation	Kazakhstan	Asia
Paleocene	Sables de Bracheux Formation	France	Europe
Paleocene	Tuffeau de St-Omer Formation	France	Europe
Paleocene	Aquia Formation	United States	North America
Paleocene	Hornerstown Formation	United States	North America
Paleocene	Williamsburg Formation	United States	North America
Paleocene	Conway Formation	New Zealand	Oceania
Unknown	Chiela Beds	Angola	Africa
Unknown	Lello Beds	Angola	Africa
Unknown	La Tombe Beds	DRC	Africa
Unknown	Argiles d'Lignite du Soissonais Formation	France	Europe
Unknown	Wilcox Group	United States	North America

Select localities where Otodus obliquus have been discovered, with Yellow denoting records from the Eocene, Orange denoting records from the Paleocene and red denoting records of uncertain age.
