= Māripi =

Traditional Māori knife

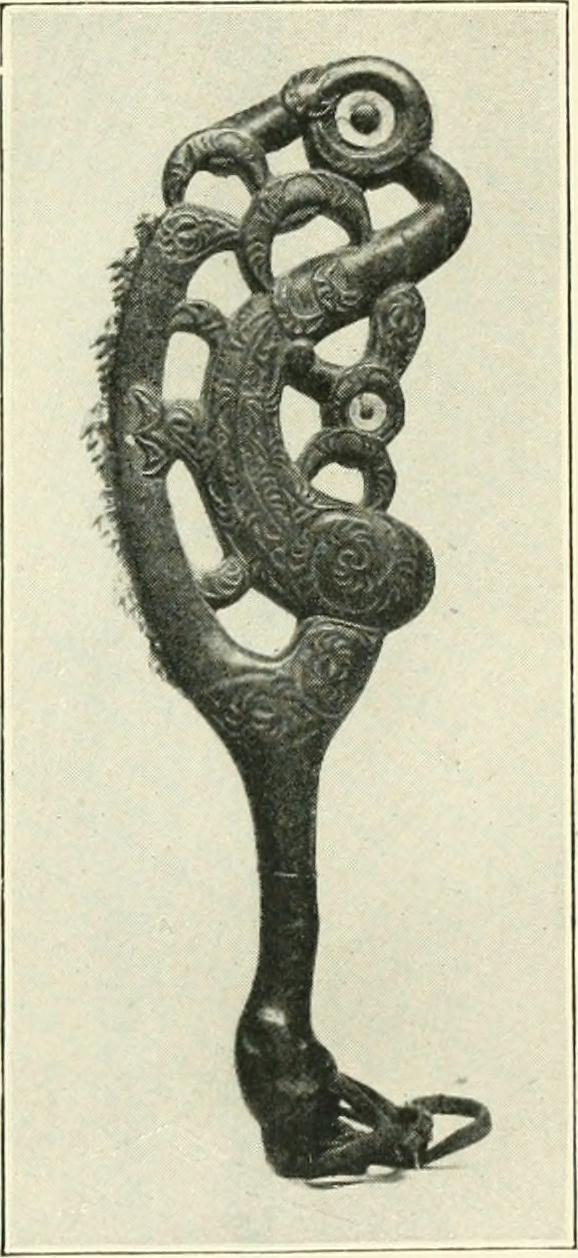
A māripi

A māripi is a type of knife consisting of carved wood with shark teeth embedded in it. It was traditionally made by Māori, the indigenous people of New Zealand. It was used for cutting meat, and not generally as a weapon.
