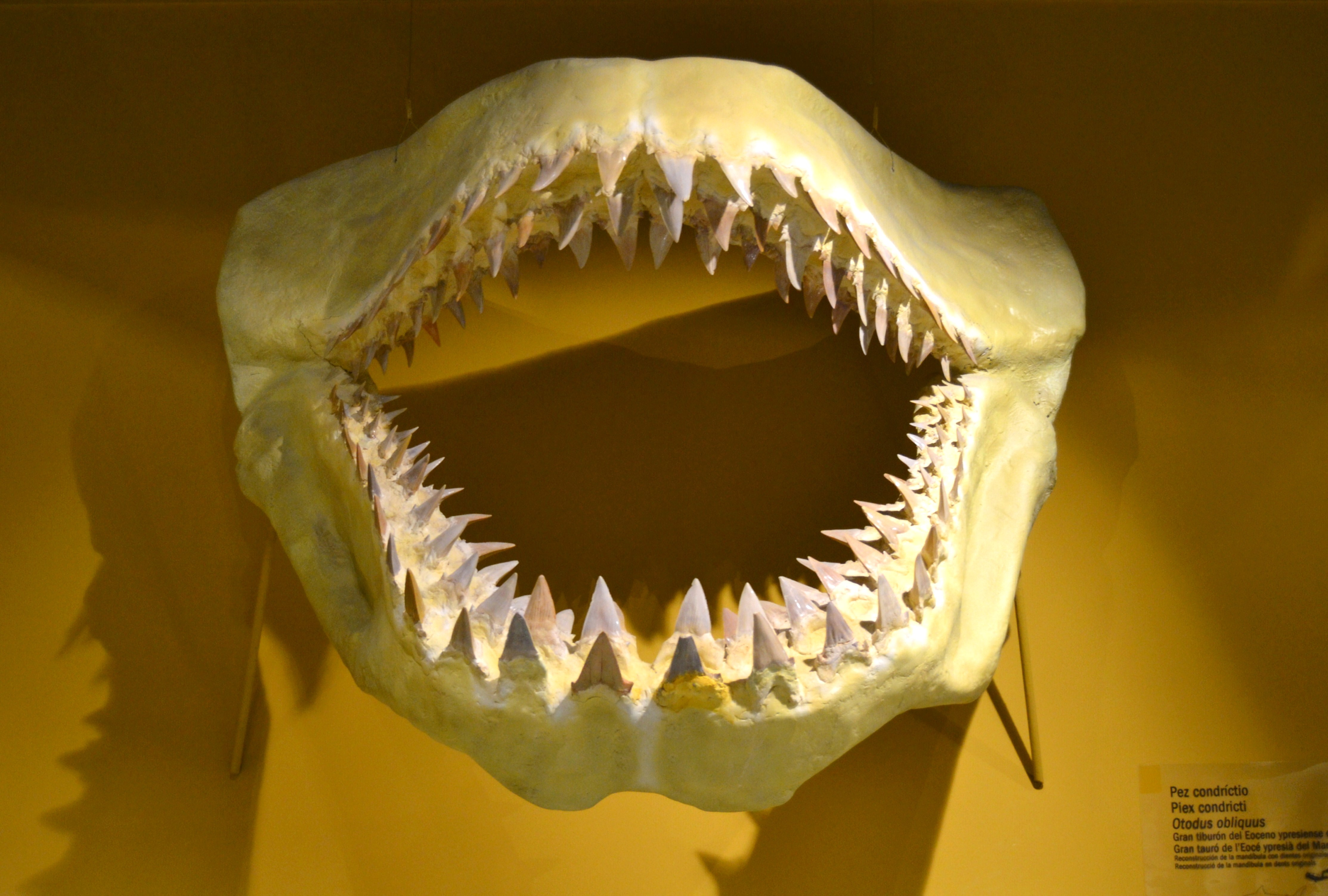
- Reconstructed jaws of a Paleogene Otodus (O. obliquus)
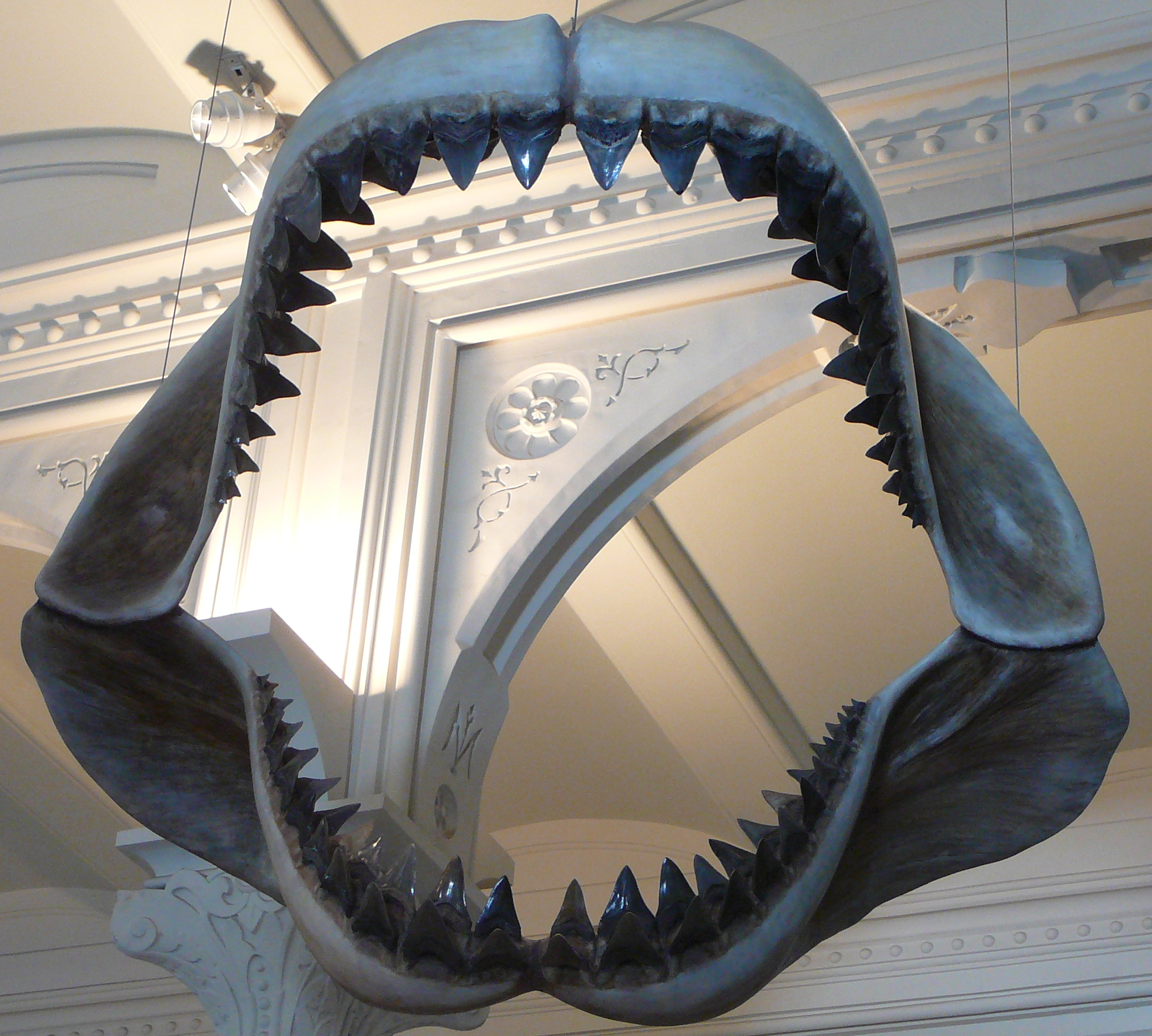
- Reconstructed jaws of a Neogene Otodus (O. megalodon)

Scientific classification
- Kingdom: Animalia
- Phylum: Chordata
- Class: Chondrichthyes
- Subclass: Elasmobranchii
- Division: Selachii
- Order: Lamniformes
- Family: †Otodontidae
- Genus: †Otodus; Agassiz, 1843

Type species
- †Lamna obliqua Agassiz, 1835

Species
- †Otodus obliquus (type); †Otodus aksuaticus; †Otodus sokolovi; †Otodus auriculatus; †Otodus angustidens; †Otodus chubutensis; †Otodus megalodon; Species pending reassessment: †Otodus debrayi; †Otodus latidens; †Otodus mediavus; †Otodus hastalis; †Otodus minor; †Otodus naidini; †Otodus poseidoni; †Otodus rondelettiformis; †Otodus limhamnensis

Synonyms
- Carcharocles? Hannibal & Jordan in Jordan, 1923; Eocarcharodon Menner, 1932 (subgenus); Procarcharodon Casier, 1960; Megaselachus Glickman, 1964

= Otodus =

Otodus Temporal range: Paleocene–Early Pliocene, 65–3.6 Ma

Extinct genus of sharks (fossil)

Otodus is an extinct, cosmopolitan genus of mackerel shark which lived from the Paleocene to the Pliocene epochs.

== Description ==
All species are known from their fossilized teeth, and four of them (O. obliquus, O. auriculatus, O. angustidens and O. megalodon) are also known from their fossilized vertebral centra. Like other elasmobranchs, the skeletons of Otodus spp. were composed of cartilage, resulting in relatively few preserved skeletal structures appearing within the fossil record. The teeth of this shark are large with triangular crown, smooth cutting edges, and visible cusps on the roots.

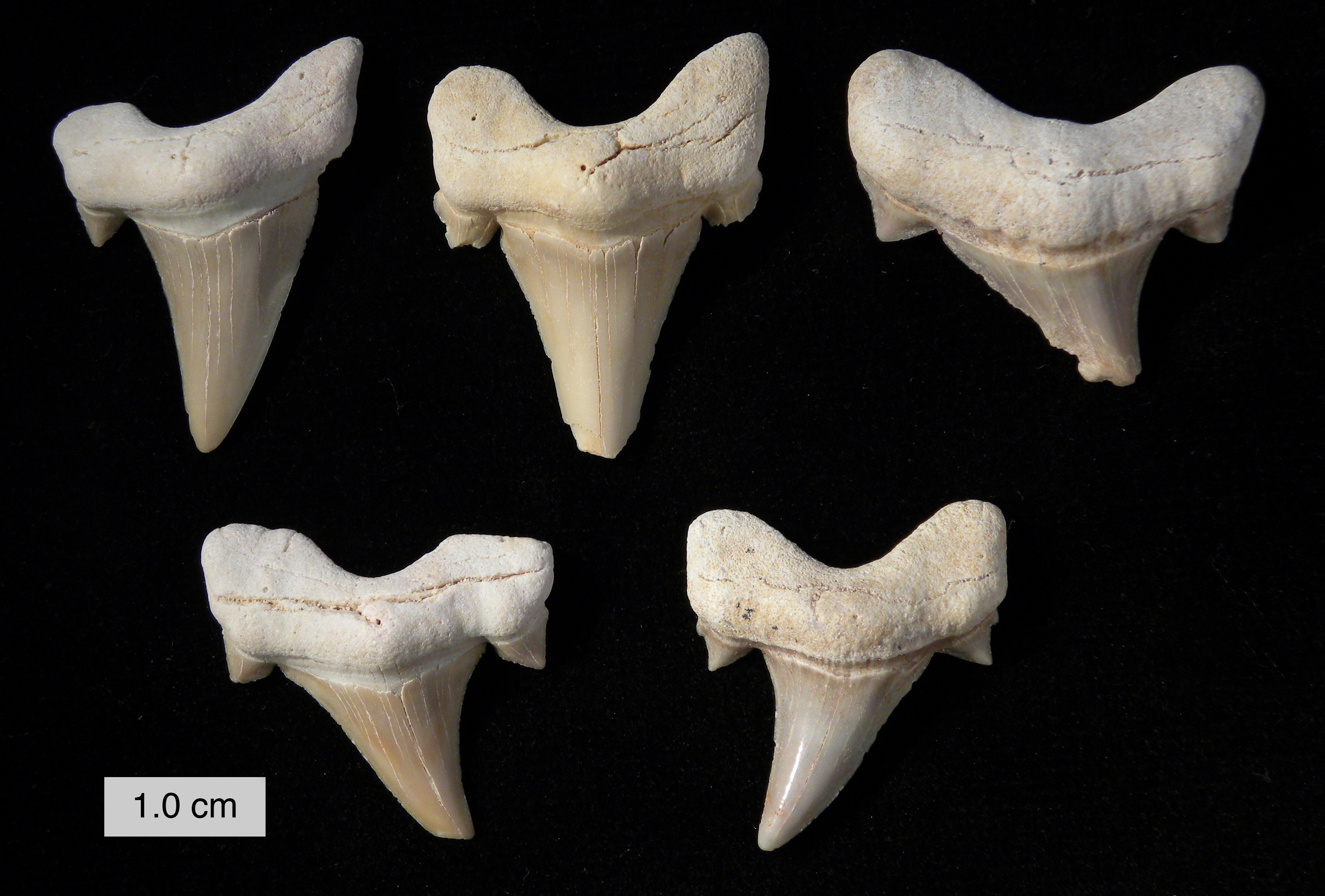
A lingual (tongue-side) view of O. obliquus teeth from the Eocene near Khouribga, Morocco

=== Size estimation ===
The fossils of Otodus sharks indicate that they were very large macro-predatory sharks. The largest known teeth of O. obliquus measure about 104 millimetres (4.1 in) in height. The vertebral centrum of this species are over 12.7 cm (5 inch) wide. Scientists suggest that O. obliquus would have measured about 8–9 metres (26–30 ft) long. Other species were much larger, with O. auriculatus, O. angustidens and O. chubutensis being estimated to have reached maximum body lengths of 9.5 metres (31 ft), 11–12 metres (36–39 ft) and 13.5 metres (44 ft), respectively. Studies estimating the maximum body length of O. megalodon have varied, stating measurements ranging from approximately 20.3 metres (67 ft) to 24.3 m (80 ft).

=== Growth and reproduction ===
Comparative studies of the centrum radii and growth rings on the vertebrae of O. obliquus and the extant great white shark through X-rays have concluded that the sizes of the vertebrae at birth are similar, meaning that the offspring of both species would have the same size (between 1.1 and 1.6 m (3.6 and 5.2 ft) in length); they also revealed that they grew at the same rate until reaching 10 years of age, during which O. obliquus would have become sexually mature and attained a growth rate faster than that of the extant great white shark. A sexually mature individual of O. obliquus would have measured about 4 m (13 ft) long. Like the extant great white shark, it is likely that males could have reached sexual maturity earlier than females.

O. angustidens also had a faster growth rate than the extant great white shark, while O. auriculatus and the extant great white shark had a similar growth rate. O. megalodon had a much faster growth rate (nearly two times that of the extant great white), but likely had an extremely delayed sexual maturity based on the result of the study that the slowing or cessation of somatic growth in megalodon occurred around 25 years of age.

Like contemporaneous sharks, at least two species of Otodus (O. angustidens and O. megalodon) made use of nursery areas to birth their young in, specifically warm-water coastal environments with large amounts of food and protection from predators. A possible nursery area of O. obliquus has been discovered in the Ganntour basin, Morocco.

== Distribution ==
Otodus had a worldwide distribution, as fossils have been excavated from Africa, Asia, Europe, North America, South America, Caribbean and Australia.

== Diet ==
Otodus was likely the apex predator of its time and commonly preyed upon fish, sea turtles, cetaceans (e.g. whales), and sirenids.

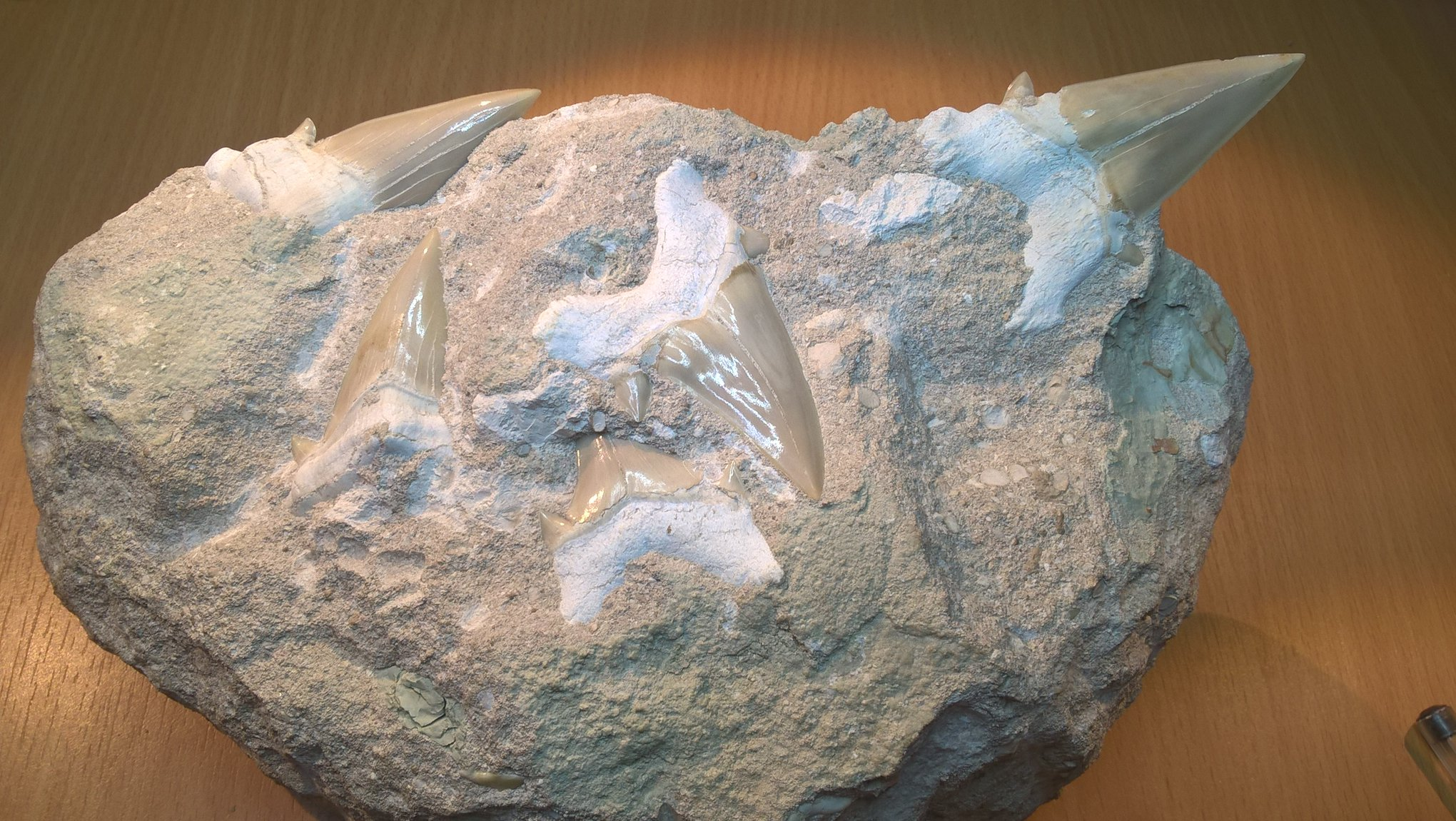
Block with five O. obliquus teeth from the Ypresian of Khouribga, Morocco

There is also potential evidence that Otodus hunted raptorial sperm whales; a tooth belonging to an undetermined 4 m (13 ft) long physeteroid closely resembling those of Acrophyseter discovered in the Nutrien Aurora Phosphate Mine in North Carolina suggests that a megalodon or O. chubutensis may have aimed for the head of the sperm whale in order to inflict a fatal bite, the resulting attack leaving distinctive bite marks on the tooth. While scavenging behavior cannot be ruled out as a possibility, the placement of the bite marks is more consistent with predatory attacks than feeding by scavenging, as the jaw is not a particularly nutritious area for a shark to feed or focus on. The fact that the bite marks were found on the tooth's roots further suggest that the shark broke the whale's jaw during the bite, suggesting the bite was extremely powerful. The fossil is also the first known instance of an antagonistic interaction between a sperm whale and an otodontid shark recorded in the fossil record.

Schwenk et al. (2026) compared zinc enrichment of the enameloid of Otodus obliquus and O. megalodon, finding evidence of higher concentrations of zinc in regions of teeth of O. megalodon which were affected by high stress during feeding and finding evidence of less pronounced spatial variation of zinc in O. obliquus, and interpret this finding as suggestive of a shift from a fish-based diet to a more marine mammal-based diet during the evolutionary history of otodontid sharks.

== Evolution ==
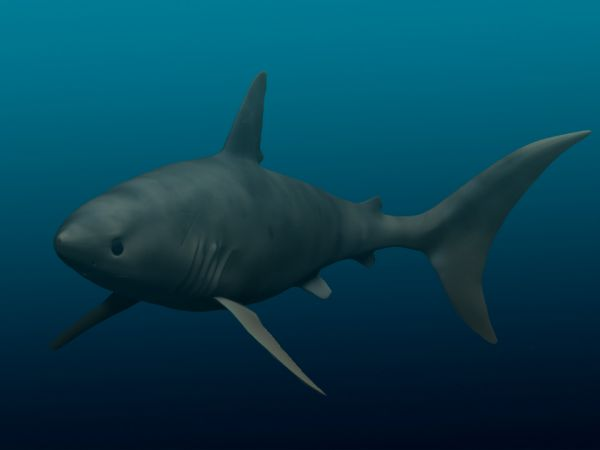
Life restoration of O. obliquus

It is widely believed that the genus originates from a lineage of sharks belonging to the genus Cretalamna, due to strong similarities in tooth morphology. Scientists determined that Otodus evolved into the genus Carcharocles, given substantial fossil evidence in the form of transitional teeth. Some teeth have been excavated from the sediments of the Nanjemoy Formation in Maryland, USA, Ypres clay in Belgium, and western Kazakhstan, which are morphologically very similar to Otodus teeth but with lightly serrated cusplets and a serrated cutting edge. These transitional fossils suggest a worldwide evolutionary event, and support the theory that Otodus eventually evolved into Otodus aksuaticus and thus initiated the Carcharocles lineage. A more recent study of Megalolamna's taxonomic relationships demonstrates the possibility that Otodus needs to include the species sometimes assigned to Carcharocles (i.e., the megatoothed lineage, including megalodon) in order to be monophyletic.

== Undescribed species ==
Otodus includes species that have not yet been formally described.

=== Otodus debrayi ===
Otodus debrayi is a species known to have lived from the Early Eocene to Middle Eocene epoch. This species has been found in Africa, North America, Central Asia, and Europe, dating from 47.8 to 38 million years ago.

=== Otodus poseidoni ===
Otodus poseidoni is a controversial species that was first described in 1999, measuring approximately 12 meters. Its teeth measure up to 10 cm (4 in) in length. Some scientists consider this possible species to be a variation of Otodus sokolovi, Otodus aksuaticus or Otodus auriculatus, but this remains unconfirmed.

=== Otodus minor ===
It was described by Giebel as a species of Carcharodon, later reclassified into Otodus, it is considered a possible synonym of O. obliquus. It includes another variation, named as O. minor var. turkmenicus or simple, O. m. turkmenicus. Fossils of O. minor were found in Kazakhstan, and are considered to be one of the first species of the genus.

=== Otodus naidini ===
It is a rare species, known only from teeth Kazakhstan, with some paleontologists suggest that O. naidini is a junior synonym of O. obliquus or O. limhamnensis.

=== "Carcharocles casieri" ===
It is an undescribed species (nomen nudum),found in Kazakhstan, considered by most paleontologists to be Otodus sp..

== See also ==
- Prehistoric fish
