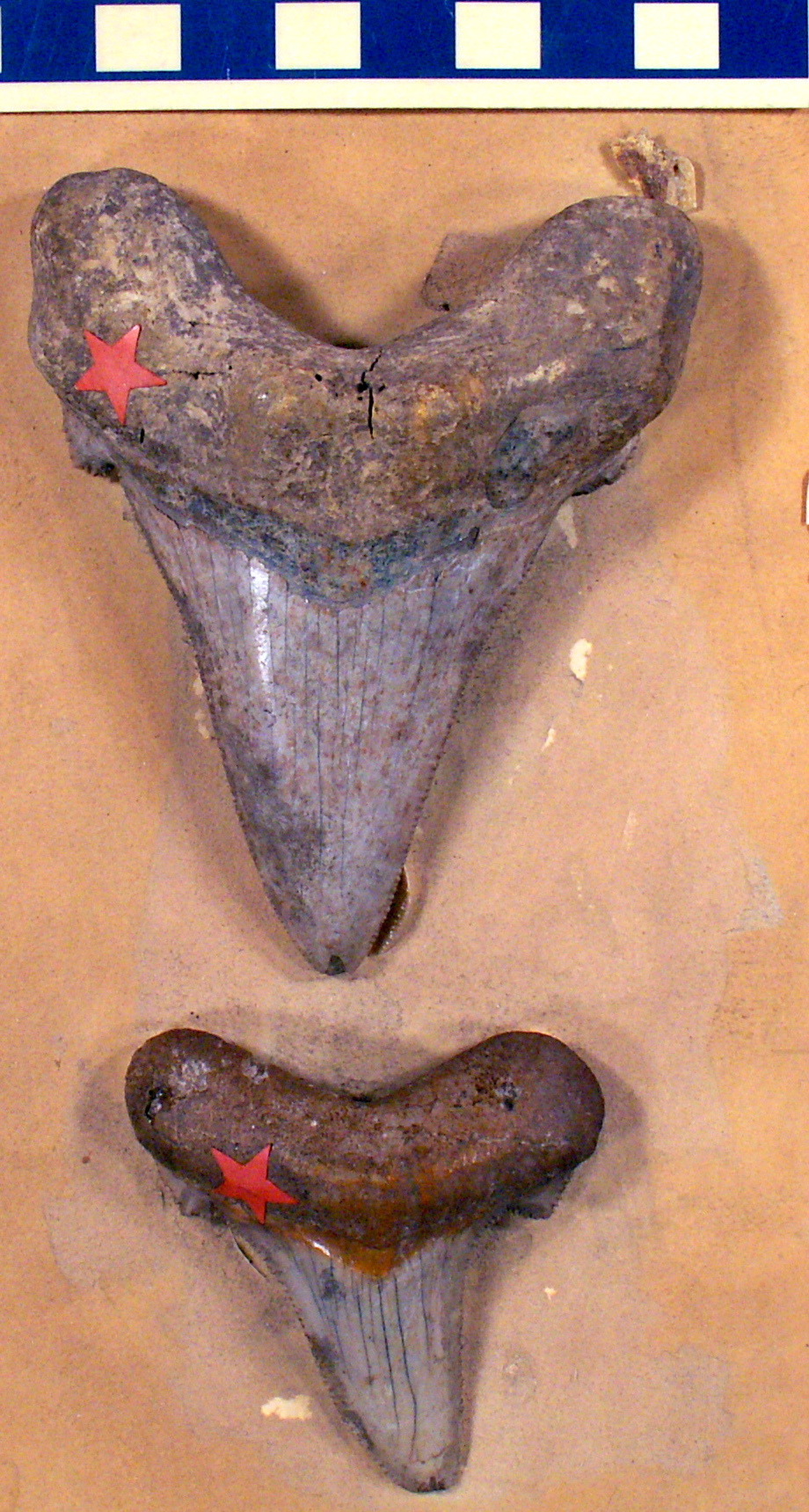
- Teeth from Craven County, North Carolina

Scientific classification
- Kingdom: Animalia
- Phylum: Chordata
- Class: Chondrichthyes
- Subclass: Elasmobranchii
- Division: Selachii
- Order: Lamniformes
- Family: †Otodontidae
- Genus: †Otodus
- Species: †O. auriculatus

Binomial name
- †Otodus auriculatus Blainville, 1818

Subspecies
- O. a. disauris (Agassiz, 1835); O. a. auriculatus? (Blainville, 1818)

Synonyms
- Carcharocles auriculatus; Carcharocles auriculata; Carcharodon auriculatus

= Otodus auriculatus =

Otodus auriculatus Temporal range: Late Eocene-Early Oligocene ~35–25 Ma

Extinct species of shark

Otodus auriculatus is an extinct species of large shark in the genus Otodus of the family Otodontidae and is a predecessor of the megalodon. The largest individuals were about 9.5 metres (31 ft) long and teeth can reach up to 130 millimetres (5.1 in). Its teeth were the first in the genus Otodus to have both coarse serrations on the cutting edge and lateral cusplets.

== Size ==
O. auriculatus was a large lamniform shark, with the largest individuals reaching a body length of 9.5 metres (31 ft). The tooth length of O. auriculatus is relatively large - from 25 to 114 millimetres (0.98 to 4.49 in). However, it is smaller than that of megalodon and Otodus angustidens; the tooth length of O. megalodon is 38 to 178 millimetres (1.5 to 7.0 in) and O. angustidens 25 to 117 millimetres (0.98 to 4.61 in). Smaller individuals were about 4 metres (13 ft) long.

== Distribution ==
Most O. auriculatus teeth come from South Carolina and North Carolina. However, many Eocene shark teeth are known from Khouribga Plateau, in Morocco and Seymour Island, in Antarctica. Fossil teeth have also been found in the United Kingdom and Kazakhstan, and the shark enjoyed a fairly global distribution. A single tooth is known from Egypt.
