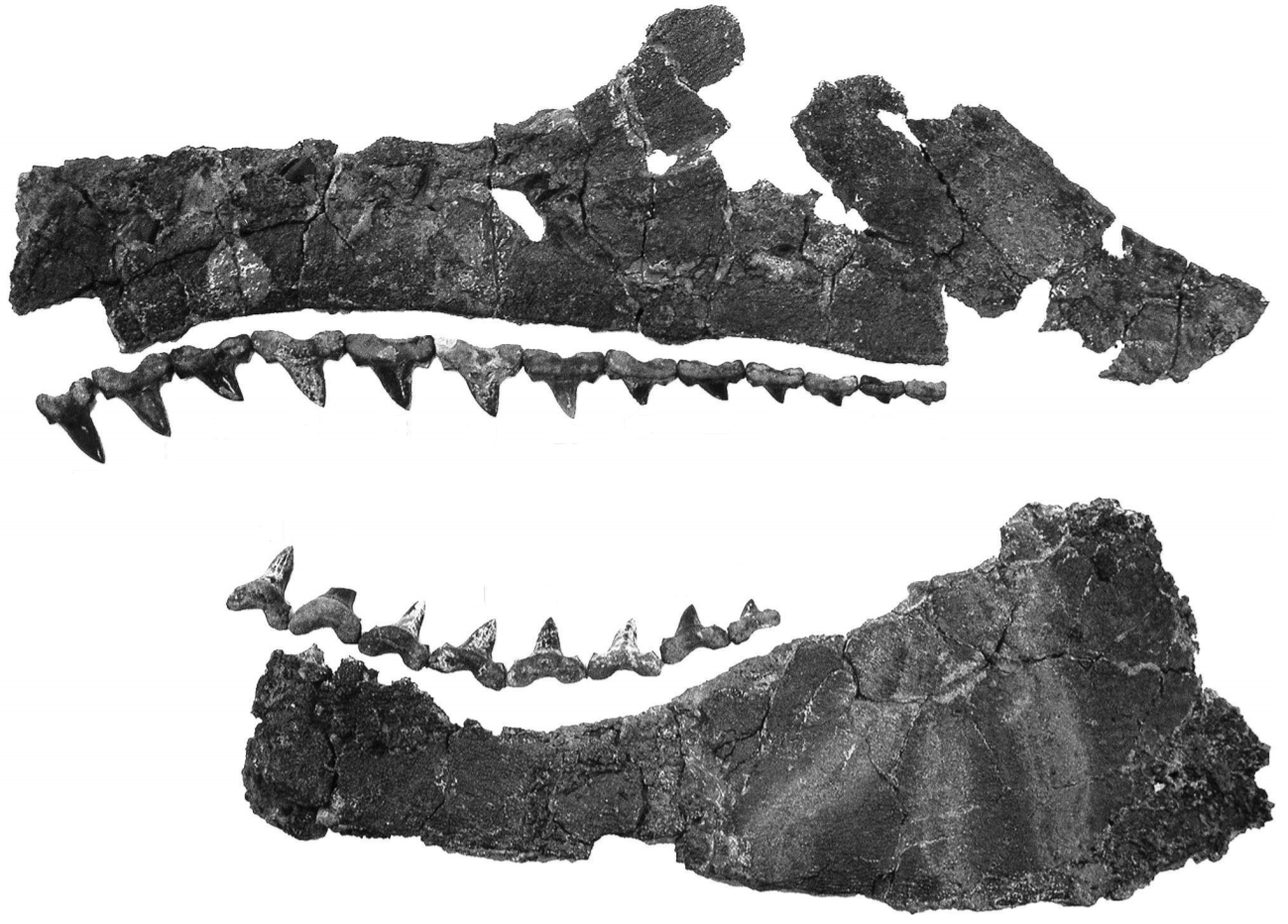
- Teeth and jaws of Cretalamna hattini
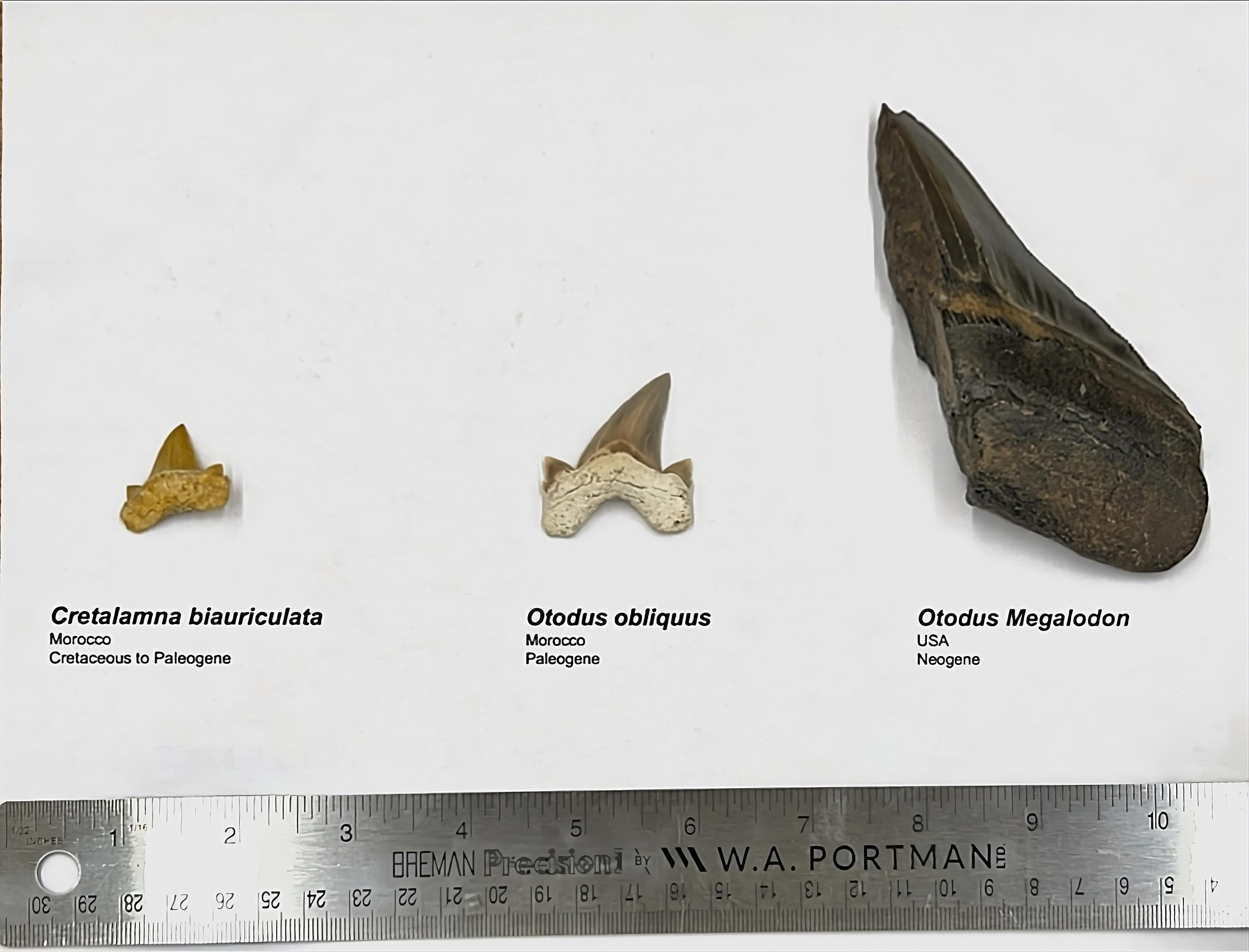
- Three otodontid species, from left to right there is Cretalamna, Otodus obliquus and Otodus megalodon

Scientific classification
- Kingdom: Animalia
- Phylum: Chordata
- Class: Chondrichthyes
- Subclass: Elasmobranchii
- Division: Selachii
- Order: Lamniformes
- Family: †Otodontidae; Gluckman 1964

Genera
- Cretalamna; Kenolamna; Megalolamna; Otodus; Palaeocarcharodon? Parotodus

= Otodontidae =

Otodontidae Temporal range: Albian-Pleistocene ~115–1.1 Ma

Extinct family of sharks

Otodontidae is an extinct family of sharks belonging to the order Lamniformes. Its members have been described as megatoothed sharks. They lived from the Early Cretaceous to the Pliocene, and included genera such as Otodus, including the giant megalodon. Although traditionally classified under Carcharocles, studies of the genus Megalolamna indicate that the megatoothed sharks were likely members of Otodus. The genus Cretalamna which lived from the mid-Cretaceous-Paleogene is believed to be directly ancestral to Otodus, and thus to megalodon.

There are certain potentially dubious species of Otodontidae where teeth are not properly described, such as Otodus debrayi, Otodus stromeri, Otodus rondelettiformis, and Otodus hastalis. These potentially dubious species are considered to be junior synonyms or are pending reassessment of their validity.
