= Menuha (disambiguation) =

Menuha is a moshav in south-central Israel.

Menuha, Menucha, Menuchah etc. (Hebrew: מְנוּחָה) may also refer to:

- Jewish principle of rest on the Sabbath; see Rabbinically prohibited activities of Shabbat
- Menuha Formation, Israel
- Hebrew female given name
  - Menucha Rochel Slonim (1798–1888), Israeli rebbetzin
