= Mishash Formation =

Late Cretaceous geologic formation in Israel

- Stratigraphic range: Campanian-Maastrichtian; ~75–66 Ma
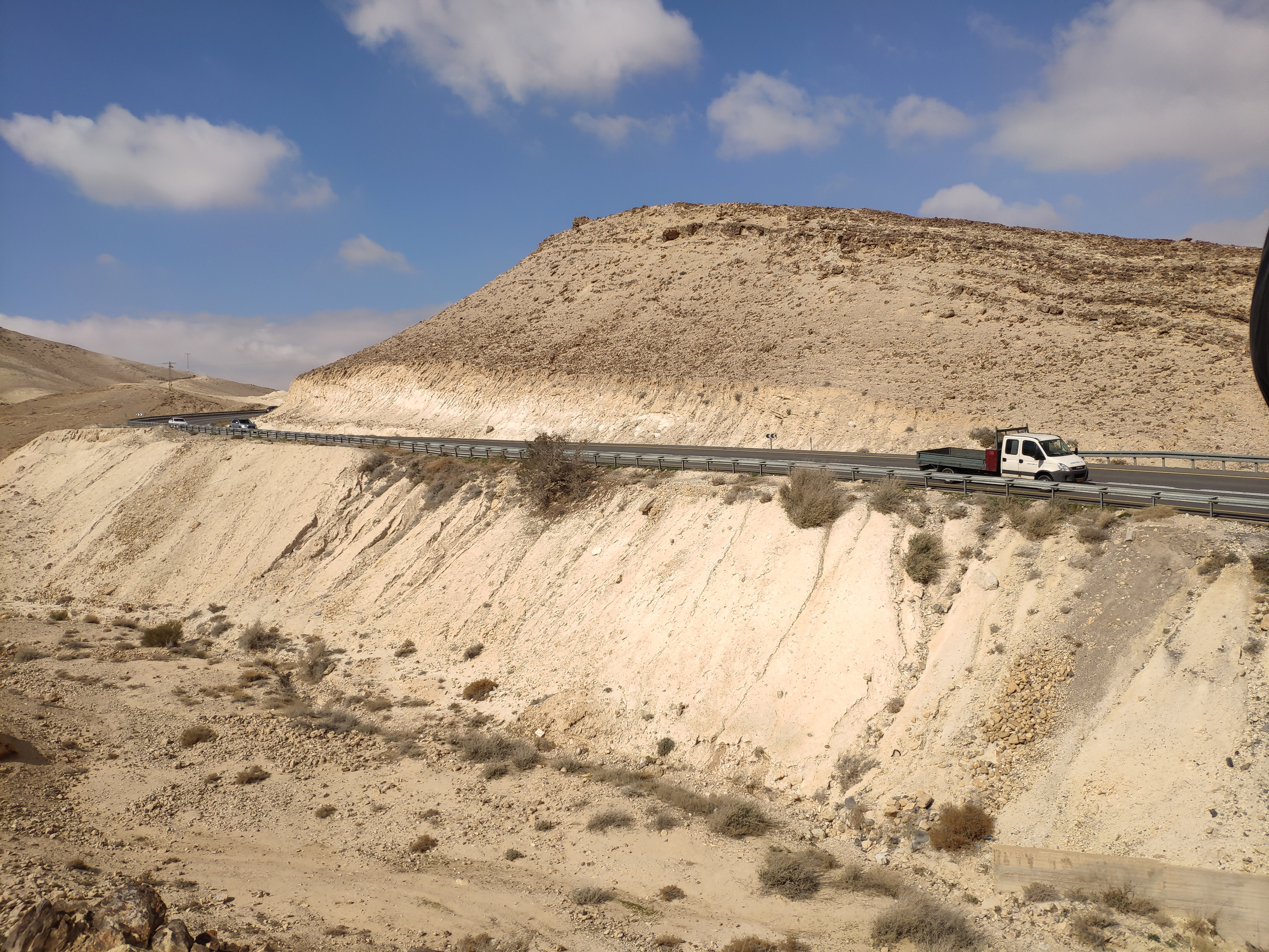
- Outcrop of the Mishash Formation (dark upper part) overlying the Menuha Formation (light lower part) near Arad, Israel
- Type: Geological formation
- Sub-units: Phosphate Member; Phosphorite Unit; Porcelanite Unit; Phosphatic Carbonate Unit; Chert Member
- Underlies: Ghareb Formation
- Overlies: Menuha Formation

Lithology
- Primary: Limestone
- Other: Phosphorite

Location
- Coordinates: 30.2°N 35.0°E
- Approximate paleocoordinates: 13.1°N 30.2°E
- Country: Israel
- Mishash Formation (Israel)

The Mishash Formation is a Late Cretaceous (Campanian-Maastrichtian) geologic formation in Israel. The formation is correlated with the Duwi Formation of Egypt and the Amman and Ruseifa Formations of Jordan. Mosasaur fossils assigned to Prognathodon currii and pterosaur fossils have been recovered from the formation.

== Stratigraphy ==
The lower boundary of the Mishash Formation lies atop the top of the underlying Menuha Formation, while the upper boundary is covered by the overlying Ghareb Formation. The Mishash Formation is divided into two members known as the Chert Member and Phosphate Member, with the latter overlying the former. Massive chert beds comprise the Chert Member, while the Phosphate Member is made up of cherts, phosphorites, porcellanites and organic-rich carbonates. The Phosphate Member is further divided into three units; the Phosphatic Carbonate Unit lies at the bottom of the member, followed by the Porcelanite Unit in the middle, and finally the Phosphorite Unit at the top.

== Fossil content ==
Color key: Taxon / Reclassified taxon / Taxon falsely reported as present / Dubious taxon or junior synonym / Ichnotaxon / Ootaxon / Morphotaxon	Notes; Uncertain or tentative taxa are in small text; ~~crossed out~~ taxa are discredited.

=== Reptiles ===
Reptiles of the Mishash Formation
Genus	Species	Location	Stratigraphic position	Material	Notes	Image
Arambourgiania	A. sp.	Nahal Qazra & Oron	Phosphate Member (Phosphorite & Phosphatic Carbonate units)	Endocranium & bone casts	An azhdarchid pterosaur, originally reported as Titanopteryx.	
Liodon	L. asiaticum	Near Jerusalem		Numerous bones	A dubious mosasaur, remains now assigned to Mosasaurinae indet. & Mosasaurini incertae sedis	
Mosasaurinae indet.	Indeterminate	Northeastern Jerusalem		Caudal vertebrae	Mosasaur remains originally assigned to Liodon asiaticum	
Mosasaurini	Incertae sedis	Northeastern Jerusalem		30 bones	A mosasaur related to Mosasaurus and Plotosaurus, remains originally assigned to Liodon asiaticum	
Prognathodon	P. currii	Oron	Phosphate Member	Skull & 8 vertebrae	A large mosasaur	
Reptilia indet.	Indeterminate	Nahal Qazra	Phosphate Member (Phosphatic Carbonate Unit)	Endocranium	Remains of an indeterminate reptile.	
Titanopteryx	T. sp.	Nahal Qazra & Oron	Phosphate Member (Phosphorite & Phosphatic Carbonate units)	Endocranium & bone casts	Junior synonym of Arambourgiania.	

=== Bony fish ===
Boney Fish of the Mishash Formation
Genus	Species	Location	Stratigraphic position	Material	Notes	Image
Enchodus	E. faujasi	Nahal Qazra & Oron	Phosphate Member (Phosphorite & Phosphatic Carbonate units)	Endocranial casts	An aulopiform.	
Enchodus	E. sp.	Nahal Qazra, Nahal Zin, Nahal Ashosh & Oron	Phosphate Member (Phosphorite, Porcelanite & Phosphatic Carbonate units)	Endocranial casts & bones	An aulopiform.	
Micropycnodon	M. sp.	Oron	Phosphate Member (Phosphorite Unit)	3 endocranial casts	A pycnodont.	
Polymixiidae	Indeterminate	Oron	Phosphate Member (Phosphorite Unit)	3 complete & a fragmentary endocranial cast	A beardfish.	
Prionolepis	P. sp.	Nahal Ashosh	Phosphate Member (Phosphorite Unit)	Endocranial cast	An aulopiform.	
Stratodus	S. sp.	Nahal Qazra, Nahal Zin, Nahal Ashosh & Oron	Phosphate Member (Phosphorite & Phosphatic Carbonate units)	Endocranial casts & bones	An aulopiform.	

=== Cartilaginous fish ===
Cartilaginous Fish of the Mishash Formation
Genus	Species	Location	Stratigraphic position	Material	Notes	Image
Anomotodon	A. plicatus	Oron	Phosphate Member (Phosphorite Unit)	Teeth	A goblin shark	
Anomotodon	A. sp.	Nahal Zinim	Phosphate Member (Phosphorite Unit)	Teeth	A goblin shark	
Centroscymnus	cf. C. sp.	Oron	Phosphate Member (Phosphorite Unit)	Teeth	A sleeper shark	
Centrosqualus	C. sp.	Oron	Phosphate Member (Phosphorite Unit)	Teeth	A dogfish shark	
Chiloscyllium	C. sp.	Oron	Phosphate Member (Phosphatic Carbonate Unit)	Teeth	A carpet shark	
Cretalamna	C. appendiculata	Oron	Phosphate Member (Phosphorite Unit)	Teeth	A megatooth shark	
Cretalamna	C. caraibaea	Oron & Nahal Zinim	Phosphate Member (Phosphorite Unit)	Teeth	Species reassigned to Serratolamna	
Cretalamna	C. maroccana	Oron & Nahal Zinim	Phosphate Member (Phosphorite Unit)	Teeth	A megatooth shark	
Cretalamna	C. sp.	Oron	Phosphate Member (Phosphatic Carbonate Unit)	Teeth	A megatooth shark	
Cretascymnus	C. sp.	Oron	Phosphate Member (Phosphorite Unit)	Teeth	A sleeper shark	
Cretodus	C. sp.	Oron	Phosphate Member (Phosphatic Carbonate Unit)	Teeth	A pseudoscapanorhynchid shark, small-sized member of the genus	
Echinorhinidae indet.	Indeterminate	Oron	Phosphate Member (Phosphorite Unit)	Teeth	An echinorhinid shark	
Ganopristis	G. leptodon	Oron	Phosphate Member (Phosphorite Unit)	Teeth	Genus now deemed a junior synonym of Sclerorhynchus	
Ganopristis	G. sp.	Oron	Phosphate Member (Phosphatic Carbonate Unit)	Teeth	Genus now deemed a junior synonym of Sclerorhynchus	
Heterodontus	H. sp.	Oron	Phosphate Member (Phosphorite Unit)	Teeth	A bullhead shark	
Hexanchus	H. microdon	Oron	Phosphate Member (Phosphorite & Phosphatic Carbonate units)	Numerous teeth	A cow shark	
Paraorthacodus	P. aff. nerviensis	Oron	Phosphate Member (Phosphorite Unit)	Tooth	A paraorthacodontid shark	
Pristiophorus	P. sp.	Oron	Phosphate Member (Phosphorite Unit)	Teeth	A sawshark	
Pseudocorax	P. aff. affinis	Oron	Phosphate Member (Phosphorite Unit)	Many teeth	A pseudocoracid shark	
Pteroscyllium	P. sp. 1	Oron	Phosphate Member (Phosphorite Unit)	Teeth	A catshark	
Pteroscyllium	P. sp. 2	Oron	Phosphate Member (Phosphatic Carbonate Unit)	Teeth	A catshark	
Rhinobatoidei n. gen.		Oron	Phosphate Member (Phosphatic Carbonate Unit)	Teeth	A guitarfish	
Rhinobatos	R. sp. 1	Oron	Phosphate Member (Phosphorite Unit)	Teeth	A guitarfish	
Rhinobatos	R. sp. 2	Oron	Phosphate Member (Phosphorite Unit)	Teeth	A guitarfish	
Rhinobatos	R. sp. 3	Oron	Phosphate Member (Phosphatic Carbonate Unit)	Teeth	A guitarfish	
Rhombodus	R. binkhorsti	Nahal Zinim	Phosphate Member (Phosphorite Unit)	Teeth	A myliobatiform ray	
Scapanorhynchus	S. cf. raphiodon	Oron	Phosphate Member (Phosphorite Unit)	Teeth	A goblin shark	
Sclerorhynchus	S. leptodon	Oron	Phosphate Member (Phosphorite & Phosphatic Carbonate units)	Teeth	A sawskate originally reported as Ganopristis leptodon	
Sclerorhynchus	S. sp.	Oron	Phosphate Member (Phosphatic Carbonate Unit)	Teeth	A sawskate, some material originally reported as Ganopristis sp., also found in the Menuha Formation	
Scyliorhinus	S. sp.	Oron	Phosphate Member (Phosphorite & Phosphatic Carbonate units)	Teeth	A catshark	
Serratolamna	S. caraibaea	Oron & Nahal Zinim	Phosphate Member (Phosphorite Unit)	Teeth	A serratolamnid shark	
Squalicorax	S. bassanii	Oron	Phosphate Member (Phosphorite Unit)	Teeth	An anacoracid shark	
Squalicorax	S. pristodontus	Oron & Nahal Zinim	Phosphate Member (Phosphorite & Phosphatic Carbonate units)	Teeth	An anacoracid shark	
Squalicorax	S. sp.	Oron & Nahal Zinim	Phosphate Member (Phosphorite & Phosphatic Carbonate units)	Teeth	An anacoracid shark	
Squalus	S. sp.	Oron	Phosphate Member (Phosphorite Unit)	Teeth	A dogfish shark	
Squatina	S. hassei	Oron	Phosphate Member (Phosphorite Unit)	Teeth	An angelshark	
Triakidae	Triakid 1	Oron	Phosphate Member (Phosphorite Unit)	Teeth	A houndshark	
Triakidae	Triakid 2	Oron	Phosphate Member (Phosphorite Unit)	Teeth	A houndshark	

== See also ==
- List of pterosaur-bearing stratigraphic units
