= Menuha Formation =

Geological formation in Israel

- Stratigraphic range: Santonian-Early Campanian; ~85.8–80 Ma
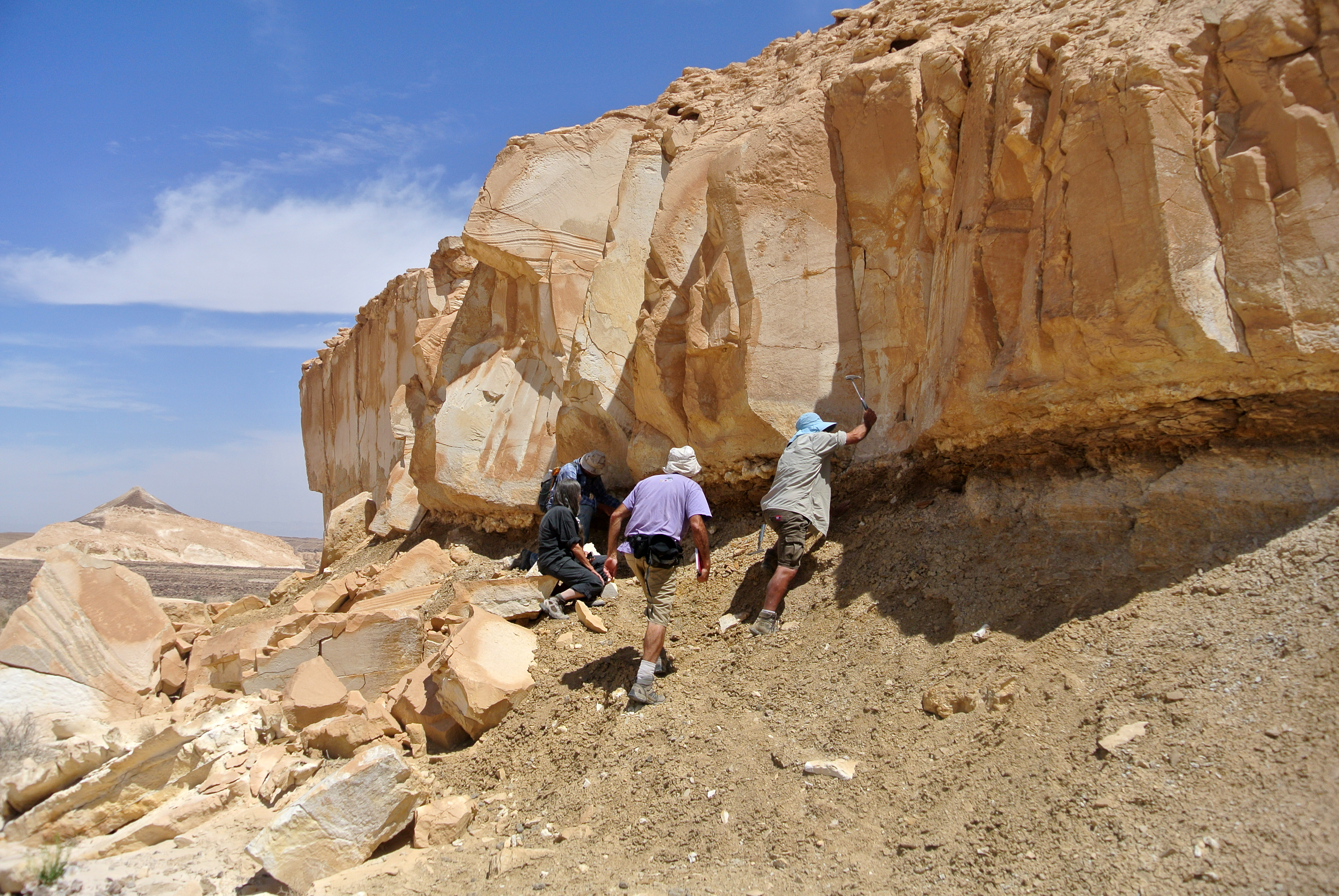
- Menuha Formation exposed in Wadi Zihor.
- Type: Sedimentary
- Unit of: Mount Scopus Group
- Underlies: Mishash Formation
- Overlies: Zihor Formation
- Thickness: 14–50 m (46–164 ft)

Lithology
- Primary: Chalk, marly chalk
- Other: Conglomeratic chalk, limestone

Location
- Region: Makhtesh Ramon, Negev desert
- Country: Israel

The Menuha Formation is an Upper Cretaceous (Santonian-Early Campanian) chalk, marly chalk and conglomeratic chalk unit exposed throughout the Makhtesh Ramon region of southern Israel and parts of northern Israel (Avni, 1991).

== Stratigraphy and paleoenvironment ==
The Menuha Formation records the earliest occurrence of tectonic activity within the Ramon anticline, forming the present erosive valley known as "Makhtesh Ramon" as an outcome of a sequence of erosive events evolving since the Late Cretaceous (Avni, 1993). It consists of white and yellow/brown chalk that is often glauconitic and sometimes conglomeratic or marly. The Menuha Formation likely represents a temperate to subtropical, open shelf environment deposited during the formation of the Ramon anticline. Reworked conglomeratic chalks in the western section represent marginal facies derived from this structural uplift.

The paleoenvironment is based on the occurrences of several shark and fish teeth, oysters, trace fossils, phosphatic peloids, and foraminiferans. The isolated teeth represent at least ten different species:

- Cretalamna appendiculata
- Cretoxyrhina mantelli
- Squalicorax falcatus?
- Squalicorax kaupi
- Scapanorhynchus rapax
- Scapanorhynchus raphiodon?
- Carcharias samhammeri
- Carcharias cf. C holmdelensis
- Hadrodus priscus
- Micropycnodon kansasensis?
