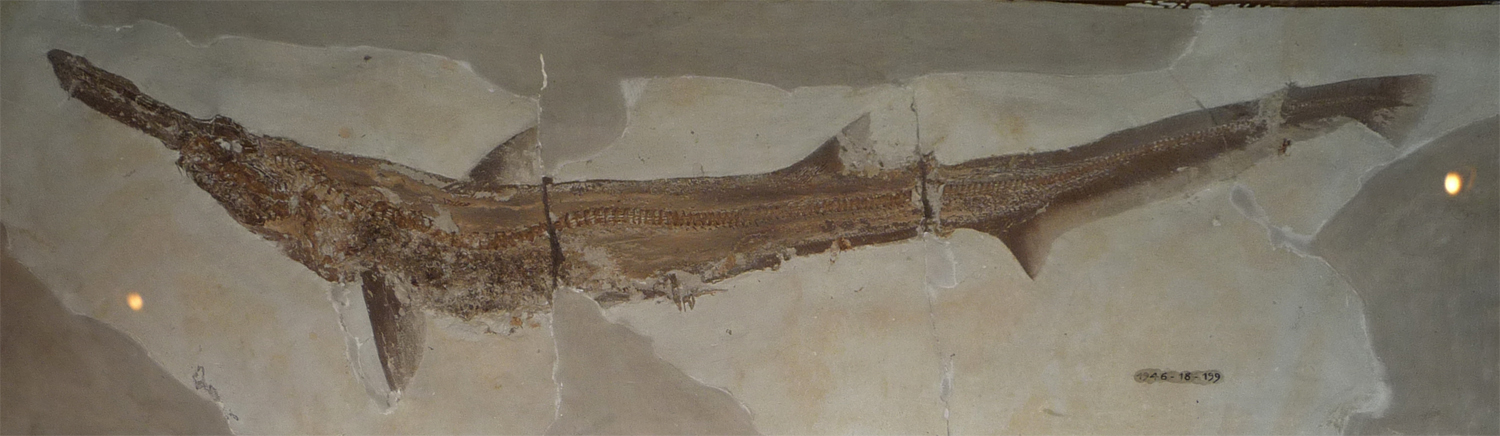
- Complete fossil of S. lewisii from Sahel Alma, Lebanon

Scientific classification
- Kingdom: Animalia
- Phylum: Chordata
- Class: Chondrichthyes
- Subclass: Elasmobranchii
- Division: Selachii
- Order: Lamniformes
- Family: Mitsukurinidae
- Genus: †Scapanorhynchus; Woodward, 1889

Type species
- Scapanorhynchus lewisii Davis, 1887

Species
- Scapanorhynchus lewisii (Davis, 1887); Scapanorhynchus texanus (Romer, 1849); Scapanorhynchus rapax (Quaas, 1902); Scapanorhynchus raphiodon (Agassiz, 1843)

= Scapanorhynchus =

Scapanorhynchus Temporal range: Aptian to Maastrichtian

Extinct genus of sharks

Scapanorhynchus (from Greek: σκάφιον scaphion, 'shovel' and Greek: ῥύγχος rhynchos 'snout') is an extinct genus of shark belonging to the family Mitsukurinidae, that lived during the Cretaceous period, from the Aptian to the end of the Maastrichtian.

== Description ==
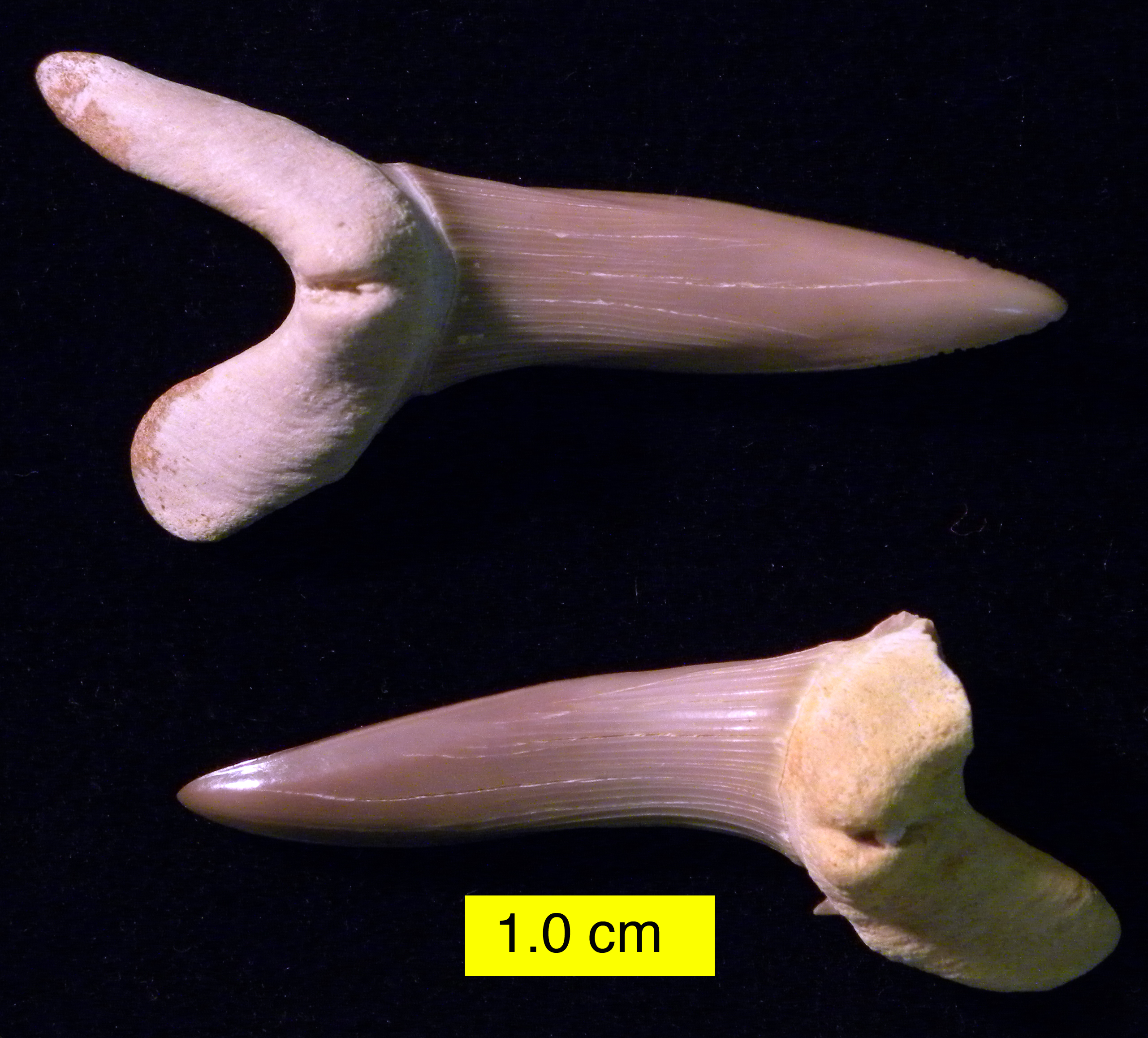
S. texanus tooth, Menuha Formation (Upper Cretaceous), southern Israel.

Scapanorhynchus had an elongated, flattened snout and sharp awl-shaped teeth ideal for seizing fish or tearing chunks of flesh from its prey. Scapanorhynchus normally did not exceed a total length of 4.15 metres (13.6 ft), although the largest teeth with height about 6 centimetres (0.20 ft) indicate an upper total length of 6.7 metres (22 ft).

Their extreme similarities to the living goblin shark, Mitsukurina owstoni, lead some experts to consider reclassifying it as Scapanorhynchus owstoni. However, most shark specialists regard the goblin shark to be distinct enough from its prehistoric relatives to merit placement in its own genus.

== Classification ==
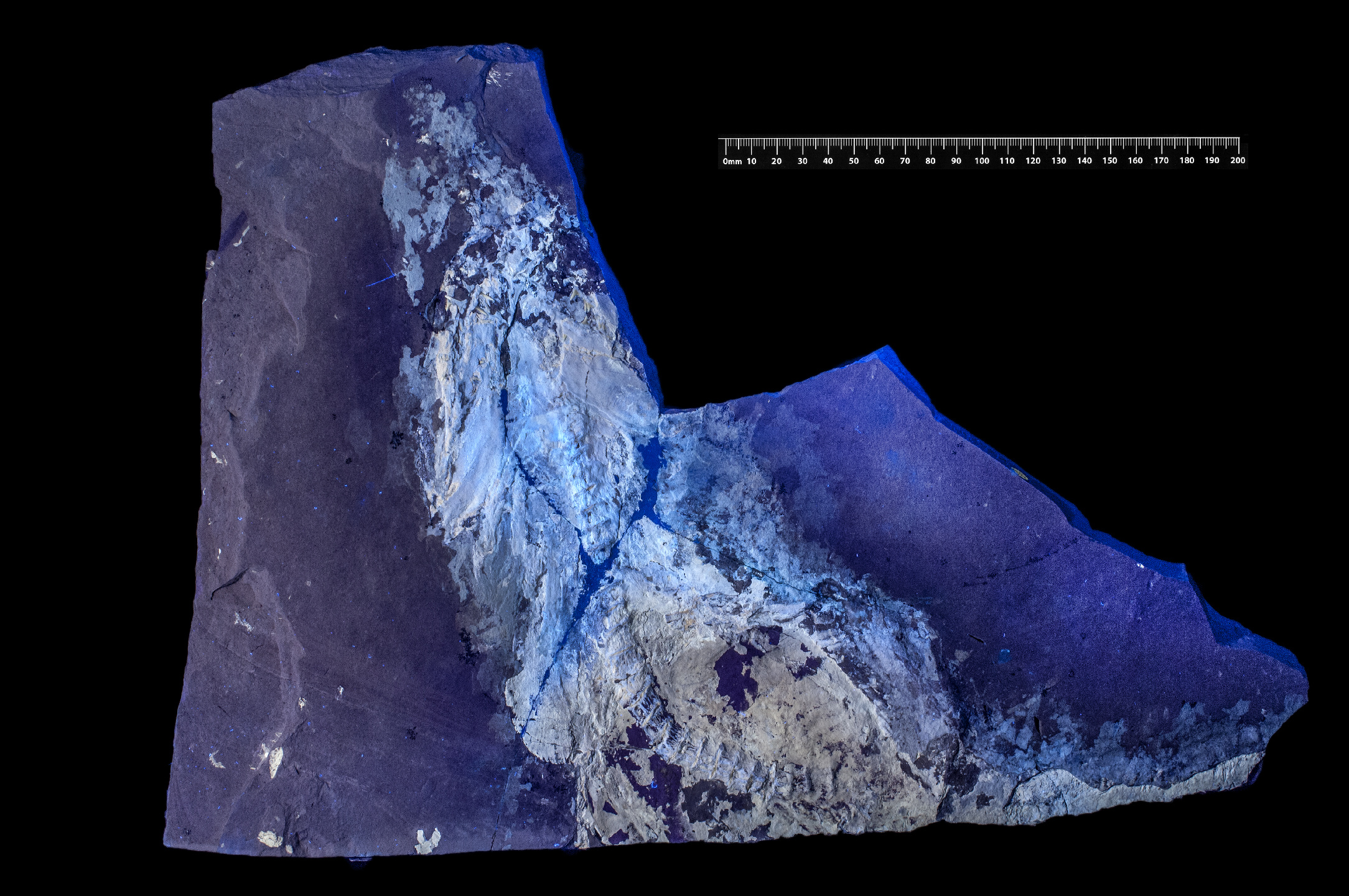
Near-complete fossil of S. lewisii, under special lighting

It is a close relative of the living goblin shark (Mitsukurina owstoni), the only living member of the family. Later claimed records of Scapanorhynchus, such as those from the Miocene assigned to the species S. subulatus, are highly dubious and may be misidentified sand sharks.

It was the first mitsukurinid to be described, with the type species (S. lewisii) being described nearly 10 years before the living goblin shark.

== Paleoecology ==
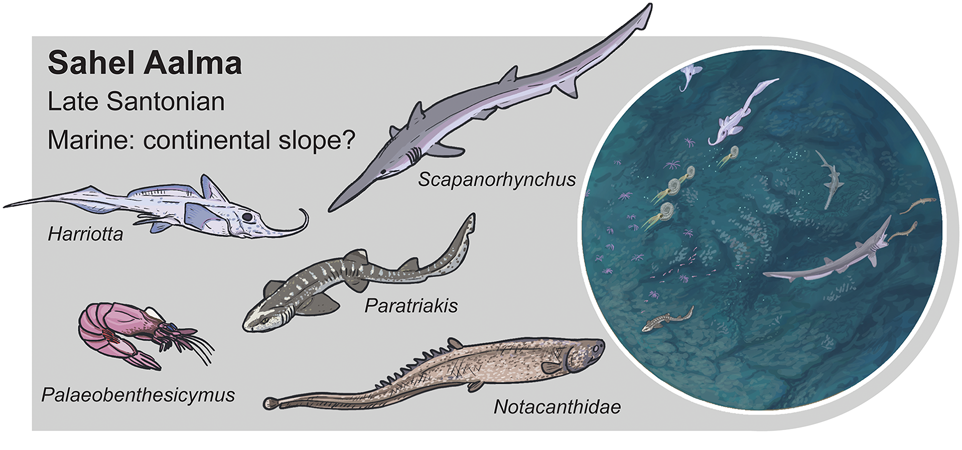
Fauna and depositional environment of the Sahel Alma locality, including Scapanorhynchus

Unlike modern goblin sharks, which inhabit deep ocean waters and are sluggish opportunistic feeders that feed on benthic fish and invertebrates, Scapanorhynchus appears to have been a pelagic apex predator that inhabited the epipelagic zone or continental shelf. An isotopic analysis of its teeth suggests that it largely preyed on fish and occupied a high trophic level in its ecosystem. It appears to have occupied a similar trophic level to Squalicorax, another marine lamniform of the same habitat. Its active predatory lifestyle may have made it more susceptible to the ecological impacts of the Cretaceous-Paleogene extinction event, as with other sharks that had a similar lifestyle.

Species of Scapanorhynchus may have occupied different habitats, with some like S. texanus inhabiting shallow marine environments like the Western Interior Seaway, while others like S. raphiodon may have inhabited deep marine environments, although it is also known from shallower environments. Scapanorhynchus has been found in shallow water rock deposits, such as those in Hell Creek, which appear to represent at least shoreline to brackish water conditions, and possibly even freshwater environments.
