= Karai Formation =

Geologic formation in India

- Stratigraphic range: Albian to Turonian; ~105.5–89.3 Ma
- Type: Geological formation
- Sub-units: Odiyam and Kunnam Members
- Underlies: Unconformity with the Kulakkalnattam formation
- Overlies: Uttatur Group

Lithology
- Primary: Mudstone

Location
- Coordinates: 11.0°N 78.90°E
- Region: Kaveri basin, Tamil Nadu
- Country: India
- Karai Formation (India)

National Geological Monuments of India
- Official name: Badlands of Karai Formation
- Designated: 2015
- Designated by: Geological Survey of India

The Karai Formation is a Mesozoic (Albian to Turonian) geologic formation in India. Fossilised ichthyosaur remains and shark teeth have been reported from this formation. It is designated as a National Geological Monument by the Geological Survey of India.

== Paleobiota ==
=== Chondrichthyans ===
Chondrichthyans
Genus	Species	Material	Family
Protosqualus	P. sp.	An incomplete tooth	Squalidae
Gladioserratus	G. magnus	A lower lateral tooth	Hexanchidae
?Notidanodon	?N. sp.	A tooth fragment	Hexanchidae
Cretalamna	C. appendiculaia	Twenty-five teeth	Otodontidae
Dwardius	D. sudindicus	Over a hundred teeth	Cardabiodontidae
?Eostriatolamia	?E. sp.	An upper lateral tooth and a cusp of an anterior tooth	Odontaspididae
Squalicorax	S. aff. baharijensis	Five complete and two fragmentary teeth	Anacoracidae
Cretodus	C. longiplicatus	Fifteen teeth	Pseudoscapanorhynchidae

=== Ichthyosaurs ===
Ichthyosauria
Genus	Species	Material	Notes
Ichthyosauria	indet.	Vertebrae	Previously known as "Platypterygius indicus".
Ichthyosaurus	I. indicus	A few complete and one partially complete vertebrae.	Considered a nomen dubium.
Ichthyosauria	indet.	Six adult teeth (DUGF/41-45), a juvenile tooth (DUGF/46), and seven partial vertebrae	Earlier tentatively assigned to P. indicus. It is similar to other species of Platypterygius. It was later noted that only one of the teeth can be assigned to Platypterygiinae.
Platypterygius	P. sp. indet.	Anterior caudal vertebra	Platypterygiine ichthyosaur.

=== Mollusk ===
Mollusks
Genus	Species	Sub-class	Family
Acanthoceras	A. rhotomagense	Ammonoidea	Acanthoceratidae
Calycoceras	C. asiaticum C. naviculare	Ammonoidea	Acanthoceratidae
Pseudocalycoceras	P. harpax sp.	Ammonoidea	Acanthoceratidae
Kunnamiceras	K. tropicum	Ammonoidea	Acanthoceratidae
Eucalycoceras	E. pentagonum	Ammonoidea	Acanthoceratidae
Lotzeites	L. aberrans	Ammonoidea	Acanthoceratidae
Desmoceras	D. latidorsatum sp.	Ammonoidea	Desmoceratidae
Sciponoceras	sp.	Ammonoidea	Baculitidae
Phylloceras	P. seresitense	Ammonoidea	Phylloceratidae
Holcodiscoides	H. elegans	Ammonoidea	Kossmaticeratidae
Cymatoceras	C. huxleyanum		Nautilidae
Eutrephoceras	E. justum		Nautilidae
Pycnodonte	P. vesicularis		Gryphaeidae

Color key: Taxon / Reclassified taxon / Taxon falsely reported as present / Dubious taxon or junior synonym / Ichnotaxon / Ootaxon / Morphotaxon	Notes; Uncertain or tentative taxa are in small text; ~~crossed out~~ taxa are discredited.
