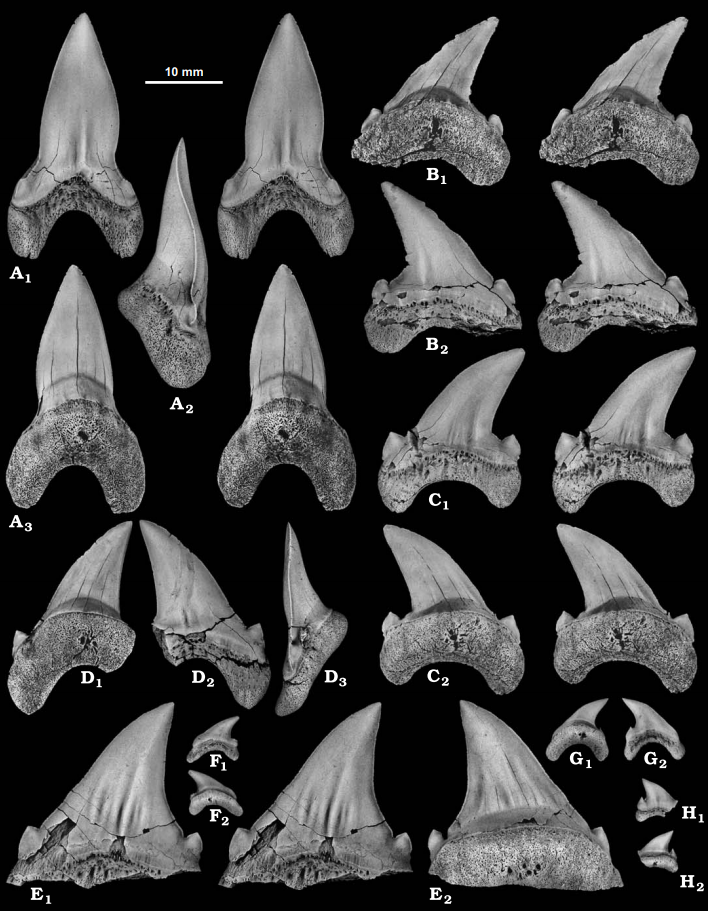
- Holotype and paratype teeth of Cardabiodon venator from the Fairport Member of the Carlile Shale in Mosby, Montana.

Scientific classification
- Kingdom: Animalia
- Phylum: Chordata
- Class: Chondrichthyes
- Subclass: Elasmobranchii
- Division: Selachii
- Order: Lamniformes
- Family: †Cardabiodontidae
- Genus: †Cardabiodon; Siverson, 1999

Type species
- †Cardabiodon ricki Siverson, 1999

Species
- † C. ricki Siverson, 1999 (type); † C. venator Siverson & Lindgren, 2005

Synonyms
- Pseudoisurus tomosus Glückman, 1957; Cretolamna woodwardi Herman, 1977

= Cardabiodon =

Cardabiodon Temporal range: Cenomanian-Turonian, 95–91 Ma

Extinct genus of sharks

Cardabiodon (/ˌkɑːrdəbaɪəˈdɒn/; meaning 'Cardabia tooth') is an extinct genus of large mackerel shark that lived about 95 to 91 million years ago (Ma) during the Cenomanian to Turonian of the Late Cretaceous. It is a member of the Cardabiodontidae, a family unique among mackerel sharks due to differing dental structures, and contains the two species C. ricki and C. venator. Cardabiodon fossils have been found in Australia, North America, England, and Kazakhstan. It was likely an antitropical shark that inhabited temperate neritic and offshore oceans between 40° and 60° paleolatitude, similar to the modern porbeagle shark.

One of the largest sharks of its time, Cardabiodon has been estimated to measure up to 5.5 metres (18 ft) in length. It may have been an apex predator in its ecosystem and likely used its large, robust teeth and fast swimming capabilities to prey on a variety of marine animals including plesiosaurs, ichthyosaurs, and other large fish. Cardabiodon also had a very heavy and stocky body. Scientists have been partially successful in calculating the life history of the shark. At birth, Cardabiodon individuals measured between 41–76 centimetres (16–30 in) in length and reached sexual maturity at around five to seven years of age, but no conclusive estimates on the maximum lifespan of Cardabiodon have been made.

== Discovery and naming ==
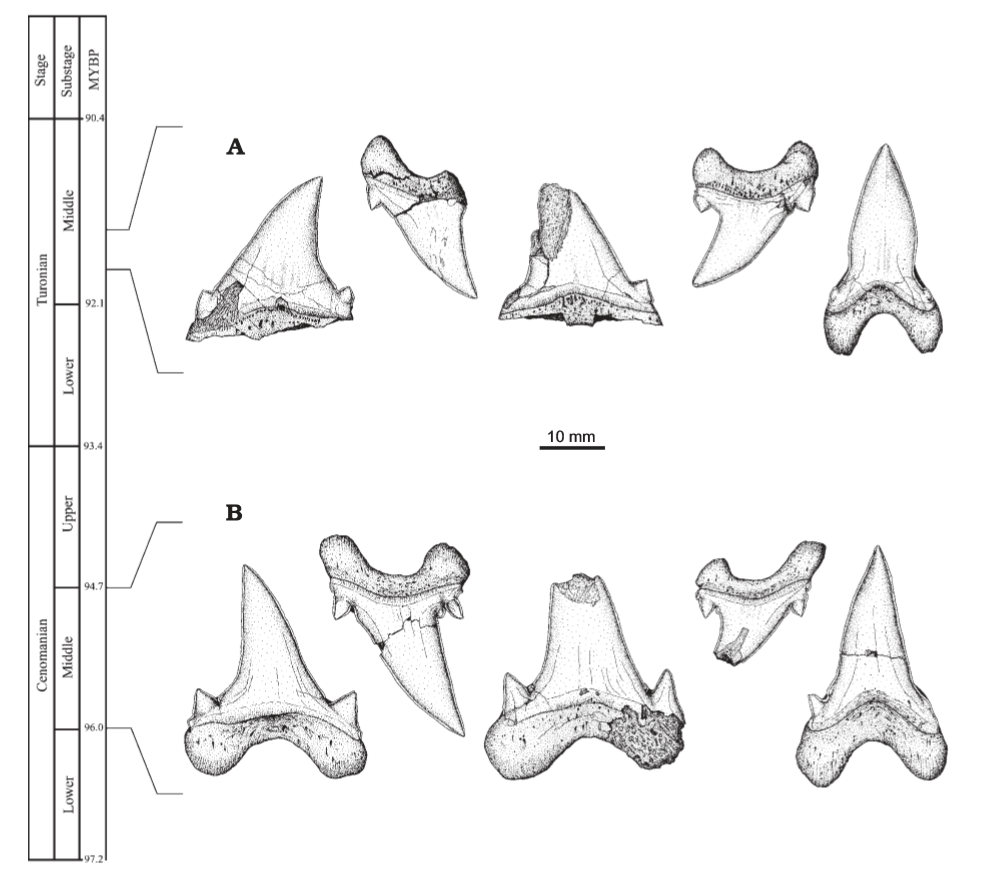
Comparison of the dental characteristics and temporal ranges of the type specimens of C. ricki and C. venator.

Cardabiodon was described from an associated fossil discovered in the Southern Carnarvon Basin of the Gearle Siltstone which is located within Cardabia, a cattle station in Western Australia, by paleontologist Mikael Siverson, who published his findings in 1999. This locality is dated in the Cenomanian age of the Late Cretaceous around 96 to 94.7 million years ago. This specimen, which is cataloged as WAM 96.4.45 at the Western Australian Museum, originally consisted of an association of one hundred teeth and fifteen vertebrae and represented a subadult shark; later expeditions to the same locality recovered four more teeth belonging to the same specimen. Siverson recognized the specimen as a holotype for a new genus and erected its type species C. ricki. The generic name Cardabiodon is an assemblage of the location name Cardabia and the Ancient Greek ὀδών (odṓn, "tooth"); when put together, they mean "Cardabia tooth". The species' specific epithet, ricki translates to "of Rick", in honor of Rick French, the owner of the Cardabia station. Six years later, in 2005, Siverson and his Swedish colleague Johan Lindgren described the second species C. venator from specimens consisting of a total of 37 teeth recovered from a locality of the Fairport Member of the Carlile Shale near Mosby, Montana, a formation dated around 92-91 million years ago. This species' specific epithet venator is a Latin word translating as "hunter" referring to C. venator's presumed position as an apex predator at or near the top of the food chain.

Before Siverson's description of Cardabiodon, its teeth have been described in the past under two now-synonymous taxa. The original description was made in 1957 by Soviet paleontologist Leonid Glickman, where he described the taxon Pseudoisurus tomosus based on four teeth from the Saratov Oblast. Earlier in 1894, Sir Arthur Smith Woodward described an association of twenty-five teeth from Cretaceous chalk around Maidstone, England under the taxon 'Lamna appendiculata' (Cretalamna appendiculata), which in 1977 Belgian paleontologist Jaques Herman found actually pertain to a new species and erected the taxon Cretolamna woodwardi. In 1996, Siverson synonymized Cr. woodwardi with P. tomosus after finding that their referred type specimens pertained to the same species. Later in 1999, Siverson reassessed the taxonomy of P. tomosus and concluded that its syntypes are lost, making it a nomen dubium. He also found that the former Cr. woodwardi actually represents two distinct genera of sharks, which was also the likely case for Pseudoisurus tomosus- The first was C. ricki (which he already described using WAM.96.4.45), and the other was assigned the taxon Dwardius woodwardi.

== Description ==
=== General anatomy ===
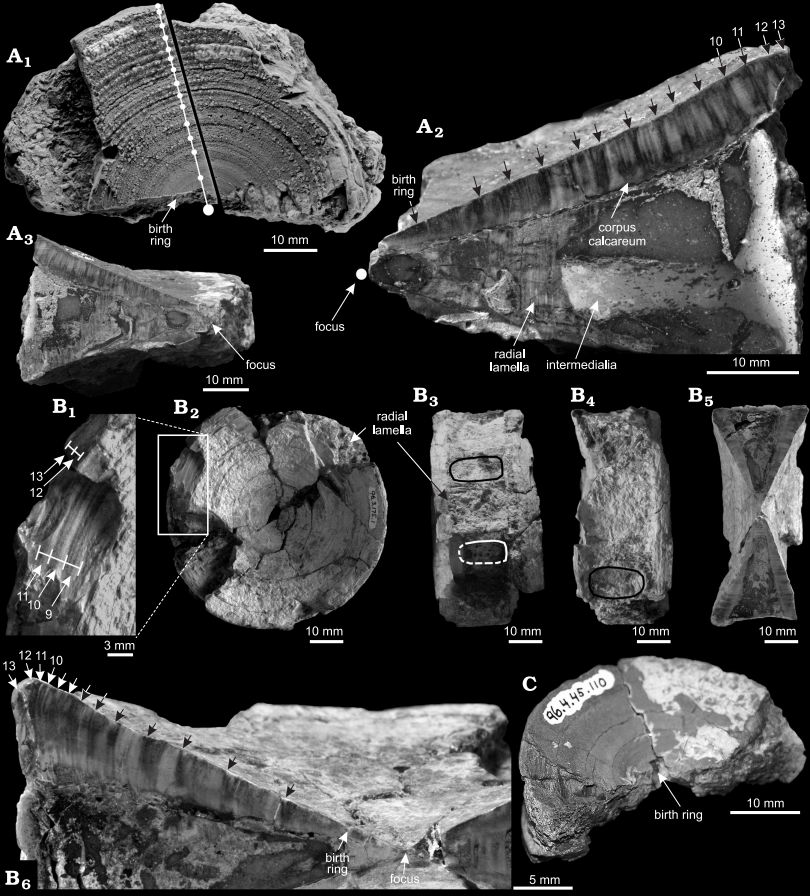
Vertebral centra from the C. ricki holotype, with arrows and dots pointing to growth rings.

C. ricki was estimated to measure up to 5.5 metres (18 ft) via vertebral comparisons with that of a modern great white shark of the same length, while C. venator was estimated to be up to 5 metres (16 ft) based on dental analysis, making Cardabiodon one of the largest sharks known. The fossil record is very sparse but currently consists of teeth, vertebrae, and scales, which is usual as the cartilage in sharks do not preserve well during fossilization, although vertebrae may sometimes be preserved if hardened via calcification.

The skin of Cardabiodon was covered by teardrop-shaped enameloid placoid scales clad with 6–8 parallel grooves that each possessed kneels. In an individual measuring 2.5–3.8 metres (8–12 ft) in length, these scales would range from 0.3–0.7 millimetres (0.01–0.03 in) in maximum dimensions. Scales with grooves and kneels are efficient in hydrodynamic drag-reduction and are correlated with the swimming ability of the shark possessing them, being common in fast-swimming sharks like lamnids. This means it is likely that Cardabiodon too was capable of fast swimming and thus pursuit of lively prey.

The vertebrae were robust. The corpus calcareum and radial lamellae, the two outermost layers of a mackerel shark vertebra, which are associated with the relationship between length and weight, were thicker than those of other large predatory mackerel sharks, suggesting that Cardabiodon was significantly heavier and stockier, although no estimation of its weight has been attempted yet. The vertebral column was rigid and spindle-shaped, which would be poorly flexible but efficient for fast swimming. Cardabiodon also had a larger body relative to its teeth.

=== Dentition ===
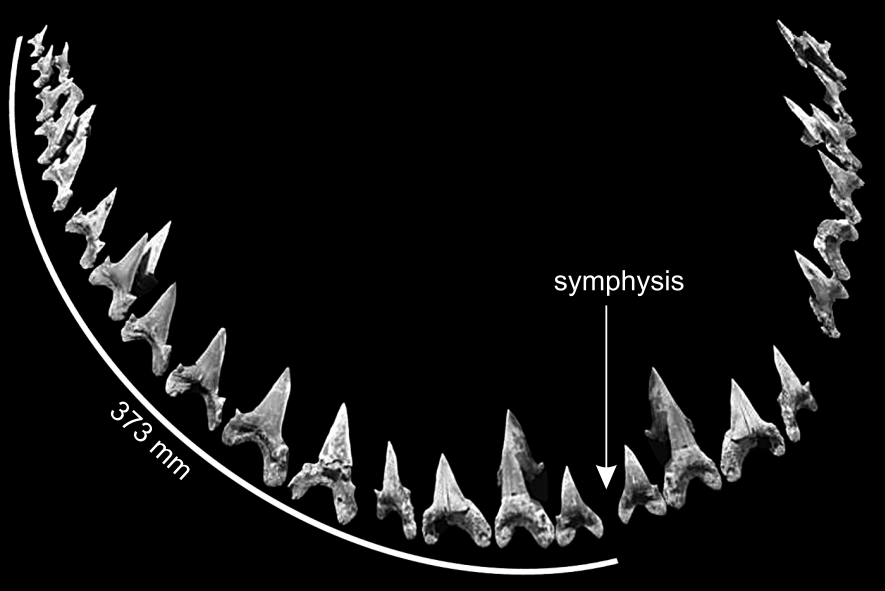
Reconstructed lower dentition of the C. ricki holotype.

Cardabiodon possessed the basic dental characteristics for a mackerel shark. Its dental structure was heterodontic, meaning that there were many tooth morphologies present. Diagnostic features of Cardabiodon teeth include strongly bilabial roots, robust crowns that is either near-symmetrically erect or distally curved, visible and large tooth necks (bourlette), nonserrated cutting edges, and lateral cusplets. The lingual side, the side that faces towards the mouth, shows a massively convex root with small nutritive pores. The crown on the labial side, which faces outwards, shows protuberance.

Cardabiodon teeth are moderately sized. The largest tooth examples of C. ricki come from the holotype. (Note: In a blog post, Siverson claimed that the largest Cardabiodon teeth found were up to 15% larger than those in the holotype. However, these finds are not validly published.) Its anterior teeth measure up to 3.67 centimetres (1 in) in maximum slant height, while the first few lower lateroposteriors are larger and measure up to 3.98 centimetres (2 in) in maximum slant height. C. venator teeth are slightly smaller, with the largest known tooth discovered being an anterior measuring 3.26 centimetres (1 in) in maximum slant height but are much more bulky and thicker instead. C. venator also has significantly shorter lateral cusplets compared to C. ricki.

Siverson reconstructed an artificial dental formula based on the 104 teeth from the C. ricki holotype, which he revised in a 2015 paper after concluding that he overestimated the number of missing teeth in the lower jaw. The dental formula based on these studies is S2.A2.I1.LP14S1.A2.I1.LP12. (Note: Using Dickerson et al. (2012)'s interpretation of the formula, which uses a more commonly used terminology) This means that Cardabiodon had mainly four types of teeth in its dentition ordered from front to back- symphysial, anteriors, intermediates, and lateroposteriors. The dental structure of Cardabiodon is unique and incomparable with any other known extant or extinct shark. In the lower jaw, tooth size abruptly increases and peaks at the first lateroposterior tooth. This is contrary to more generic mackerel shark dental structures where tooth size gradually decreases as it transitions from anterior to posterior (with the exception of the smaller symphysial and intermediate teeth). The lower teeth are also wider than the teeth in the upper jaw, whereas the upper teeth are wider for generic mackerel sharks. The lower jaw bite circumference of the C. ricki holotype was measured to be 746 millimetres (29 in).

An alternative dental formula was reconstructed from an associated disarticulated tooth set identified as Cardabiodon sp. from the Carlile Shale in Kansas, which is S1?.A2.I1.LP6S1?.A2.I1?.LP8. The study that created the formula aimed to be more consistent with generic structure of mackerel sharks, unlike the one reconstructed by Siverson, which the scientists who made the reconstruction expressed with some caution due inconsistencies towards the generic mackerel shark dental structure. However, both are still hypothetical due to the disarticulated nature of the fossil teeth used.

== Classification and evolution ==
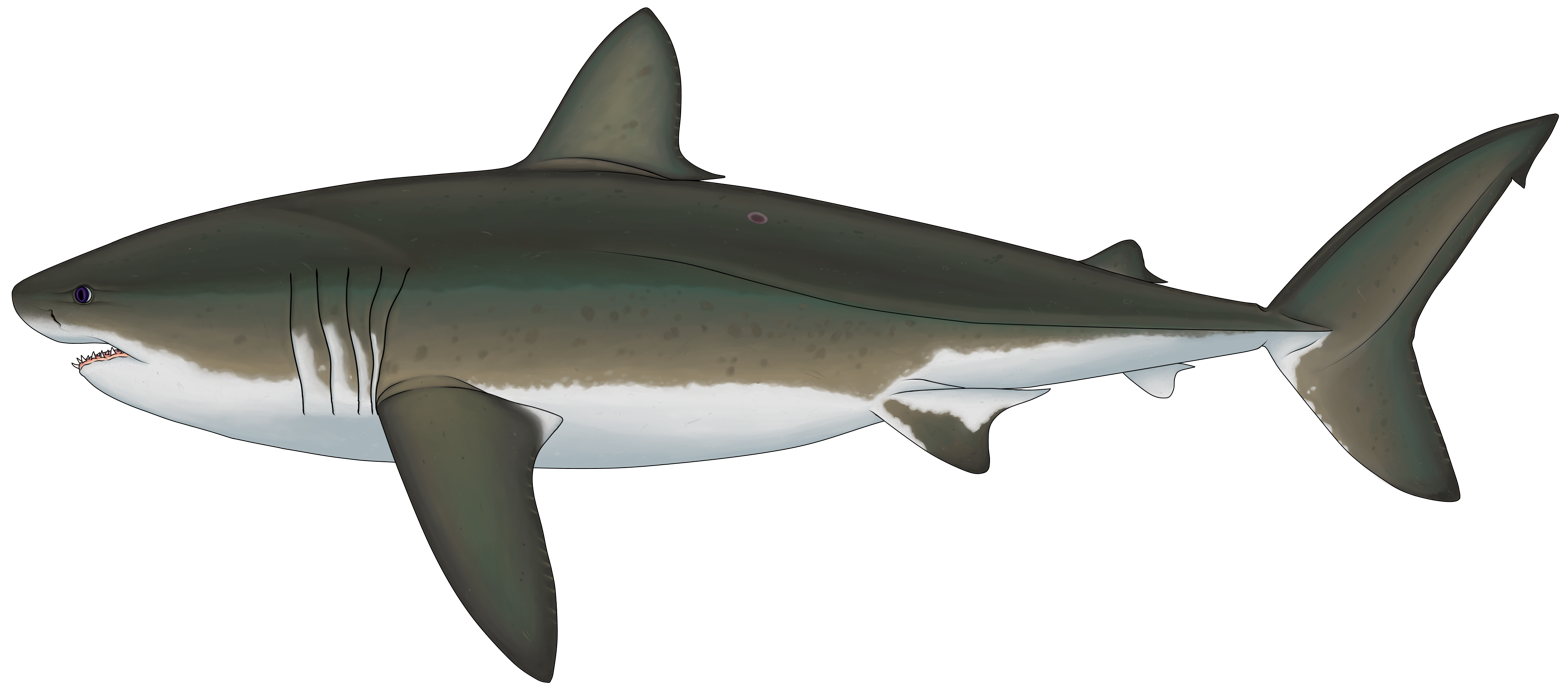
Life reconstruction of C. ricki

Cardabiodon was a unique shark set apart due to a unique dental structure. Nevertheless, it is still placed within the order Lamniformes as a mackerel shark due to its possession of mackerel shark-exclusive vertebral and basic dental features. To reflect the unique dental structure of Cardabiodon, Siverson erected the family Cardabiodontidae and placed the taxon, along with an extinct Cenozoic shark, Parotodus, in it. However, he would later express a weakening of the rationale for placing Parotodus into the family, mainly citing a ~60 million-year fossil gap between it and Cardabiodon. Another Late Cretaceous shark, Dwardius, whose teeth are very similar with those of Cardabiodon, would also be placed within the family. There has been a proposal of a close relationship between the two, and the possibility of them being synonymous genera has been raised by a 2010 study led by paleontologist Todd D. Cook. However, Siverson expressed the unlikeliness of the latter proposal by noting contradictory evolutionary trends such as the gradual decrease of lateral cusplets in Cardabiodon over time in comparison to the gradual increase of such in Dwardius but agreed that the two genera were still closely related. The phylogenetic placement of the Cardabiodontidae is uncertain and yet to be established. A C. ricki tooth recovered from Alberta deposits dating about 93 Ma was discovered to contain features usually found in C. venator, suggesting a chronospecific relationship between the two species with the tooth representing a transitional morphotype.

Although the Cardabiodontidae contains only the two genera Cardabiodon and Dwardius, several fossils of undescribed cardabiodonts from earlier periods are known. The most notable of them includes an associated set of teeth and very large vertebrae dated in the Albian age of 105 Ma from the Toolebuc Formation in Queensland that belonged to an individual that was estimated to measure 8–9 metres (26–30 ft) in length. In a blog discussion, Siverson noted the Albian specimen's teeth are less robust than other Cretaceous apex sharks such as Cretoxyrhina. He suggested an evolutionary trend of the Cardabiodontidae being marked by a reduction in body size and length, a reduction in the number of teeth per jawline, an increase in the robustness of teeth (including an increased robustness of the root and widening of the crown), and a reduction of lateral cusplets (small enameled cusps that appear at the base of the tooth's main crown).

== Paleobiology ==
=== Life history ===
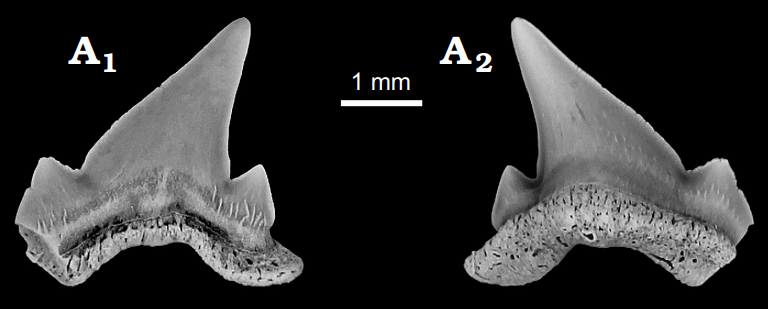
Tooth of a juvenile C. ricki from the Haycock Marl in Western Australia

Like all mackerel sharks, Cardabiodon grew a growth ring in its vertebrae every year and is aged through measuring each band. However, few Cardabiodon individuals were aged due to the rarity of well-preserved vertebrae. The ontogenetics of C. ricki was calculated using the vertebrae of three different preadult individuals as well as an isolated tooth of a newborn. When compared with the ontogenetic records of Cretoxyrhina mantelli and Archaeolamna kopingensis, the vertebrae of C. ricki suggested that total length at birth was smaller than the two sharks at between 41–76 centimetres (16–30 in). It grew at an average rate of 29.9 centimetres (12 in) per year compared to the much quicker average growth rate of C. mantelli at 40.7 centimetres (16 in) per year and the slower rate of A. kopingensis at 6.2 centimetres (2 in) per year. All three vertebral specimens showed thirteen growth rings, meaning that the individuals lived to around 13 years of age. However, a growth rate slower than C. mantelli suggested an indeterminable maximum lifespan greater than 13 years, and that the ages found in the specimens were a result of premature death. Around the 5th to 7th growth ring in the three specimens there exists a change in growth, suggesting that C. ricki reached sexual maturity around 5–7 years of age.

== Paleoecology ==
=== Antitropical distribution ===
Cardabiodon fossils have been found in Canada, the midwestern United States, England, West Australia, and Kazakhstan. It had been implied in the past that Cardabiodon may have had an antitropical distribution as these localities were between 40° and 60° paleolatitude, mimicking the range of the confirmed antitropical porbeagle shark, which only exists between 30° and 60° latitude. This was confirmed by a 2010 study that found the latitudinal, and sea surface temperature ranges between the two were nearly the same. The study also found that the highest latitudinal fossils of Cardabiodon were dated just before the warmest period in the Late Cretaceous about 93 Ma known as the Cenomanian-Turonian Thermal Optimum, suggesting a shift in distribution farther north due to increasing temperatures and tropical environments. It has been determined that Cardabiodon's sea surface temperature range was 17.5–24.2 °C (64–76 °F). It has been proposed that Cardabiodon may have been able to move from one hemisphere to the other by crossing deeper and thus cooler waters. This has been observed with modern basking sharks, another antitropical shark, which migrates between hemispheres by following cooler isothermic paths into deep tropical waters where temperatures are similar to the basking shark's normal range. Although no Cardabiodon fossils have been found outside its inferred range, this proposal is supported by the occurrence of Cardabiodon teeth in deep-water deposits around its lowest paleolatitudinal range.

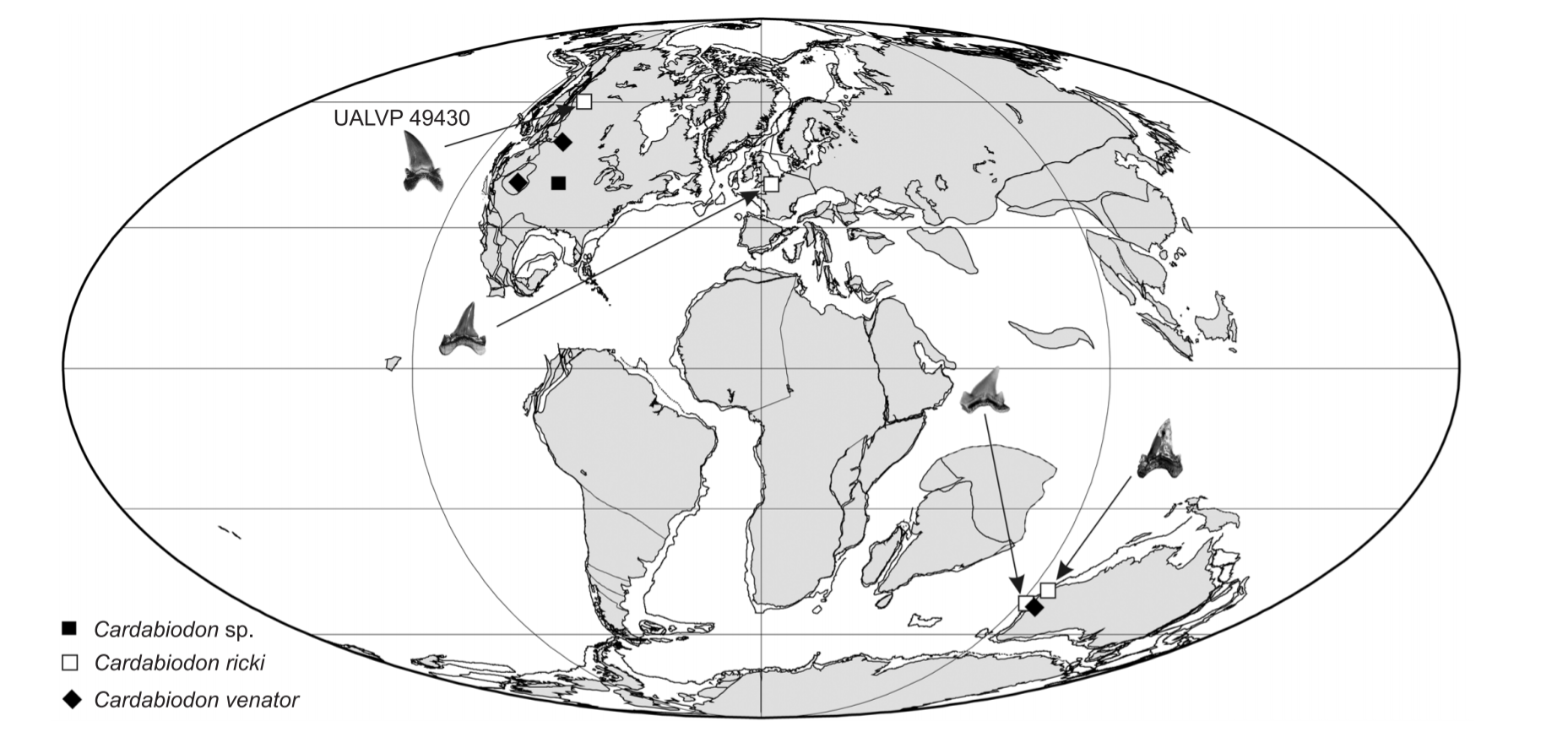
Early Cretaceous map showing the localities of Cardabiodon fossils.

=== Habitat ===
The antitropical distribution of Cardabiodon suggests it lived mainly in temperate and offshore, but moderately deep, inner to mid-neritic waters. The majority of its fossils are from North America. In North America, C. venator fossils are found mostly in the southern half of the Western Interior Seaway, which had a warmer temperate climate; they are seldom found in the northern half. Although having lived in the colder sea temperatures of 17.5–24.2 °C (64–76 °F), Cardabiodon was contemporaneous with the Cenomanian-Turonian Thermal Optimum, which led to a change in biodiversity and appearance and radiation of a new fauna like mosasaurs. Cenomanian localities in the Western Interior Seaway have yielded several marine vertebrates that coexisted with Cardabiodon, which the shark, presumably as an apex predator, may have preyed upon. These include many sharks including mackerel sharks like Cretodus, Cretalamna, Protolamna, and Cretoxyrhina; anacoracids like Squalicorax; and hybodonts like Ptychodus and Hybodus; large bony fish such as Protosphyraena, Pachyrhizodus, Enchodus and Xiphactinus; seabirds like Pasquiaornis and Ichthyornis; marine reptiles such as elasmosaurid and polycotylid plesiosaurs; the pliosaur Brachauchenius lucasi, protostegid sea turtles, and dolichosaurids like Coniasaurus crassidens. The Gearle Siltstone in West Australia was mainly dominated by Cretalamna, but other sharks such as Squalicorax, Archaeolamna, Paraisurus, Notorhynchus, Leptostyrax, and Carcharias were present. Fragmentary remains of pliosaurs are also known from the formation. Other parts of West Australia were also inhabited during the Cenomanian by ichthyosaurs like Platypterygius. Benthic faunae were rare around this time, especially in the more northern waters Cardabiodon inhabited. This was due mostly to lower oxygen levels caused by the Cenomanian-Turonian anoxic event which led to the extinction of as much as 27% of all marine invertebrates.

=== Nursery areas ===
Like many modern sharks, Cardabiodon made use of nursery areas to give birth to and raise young, which would ideally be shallow waters that provides protection from natural predators. An area of the Carlile Shale near Mosby, Montana, has been identified as a nursery site due to the rich prevalence of juvenile Cardabiodon fossils. Other localities in the Western Interior Seaway region of North America including the Kaskapau Formation in northwestern Alberta and the Greenhorn Limestone in central Kansas have also reported fossils of juveniles. Because such fossils are largely absent elsewhere, this has led to the suggestion the Western Interior Seaway as a whole may have served as a nursery area for Cardabiodon.

== See also ==
- Prehistoric fish
- List of prehistoric cartilaginous fish
