= Pseudoisurus tomosus =

Pseudoisurus tomosus is a scientific name that has been declared a nomen dubium due to its referred type specimens being lost. It may refer to:

- Pseudoisurus tomosus (Glückman, 1957): Currently considered a synonym of Cardabiodon ricki
- Pseudoisurus tomosus (Glückman, 1957): Currently considered a synonym of Dwardius
