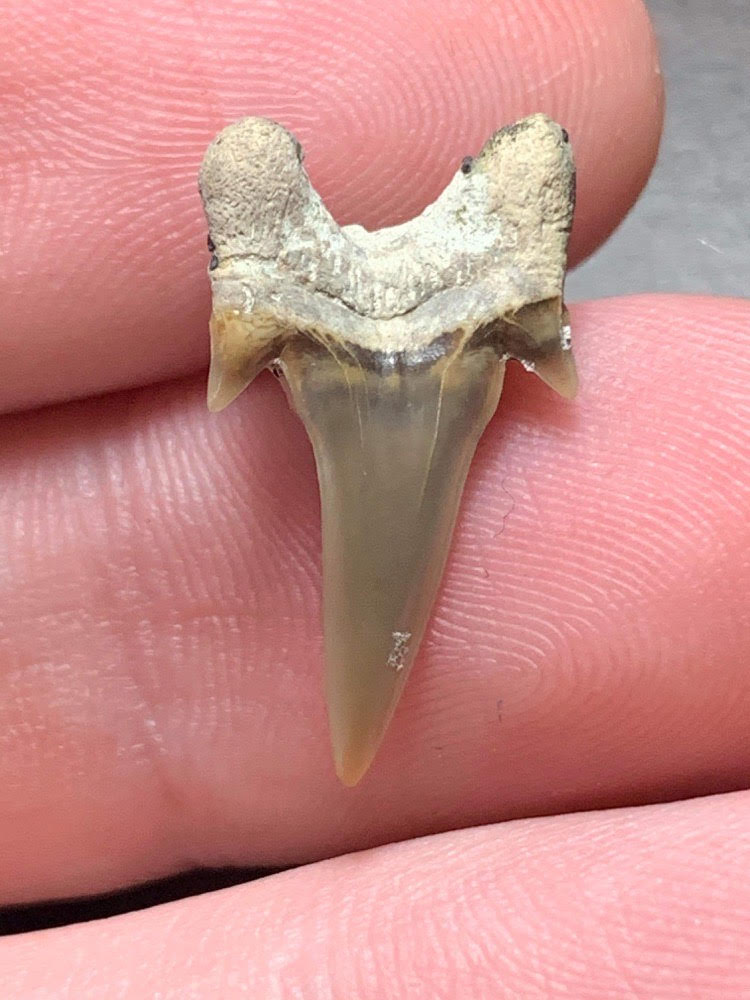
- Tooth of Archaeolamna sp.

Scientific classification
- Kingdom: Animalia
- Phylum: Chordata
- Class: Chondrichthyes
- Subclass: Elasmobranchii
- Division: Selachii
- Order: Lamniformes
- Family: †Archaeolamnidae; Underwood & Cumbaa, 2010
- Genus: †Archaeolamna; Siverson, 1992

Type species
- †Archaeolamna kopingensis (Davis, 1890)

Other species and subspecies
- †Archaeolamna striata (Rogovich, 1861); †Archaeolamna kopingensis kopingensis (Davis, 1890); †Archaeolamna kopingensis judithensis Siverson, 1992; †Archaeolamna haigi Siverson, 1996

Synonyms
- Species synonymy: A. striata; Otodus striatus Rogovich, 1861 A. kopingensis; Odontaspis kopingensis Davis, 1890; Lamna arcuata Woodward, 1894

= Archaeolamna =

Archaeolamna Temporal range: Albian-Maastrichtian

Extinct genus of sharks

Archaeolamna (from Greek arche which turned into archaeo and Lamna, an extinct shark genus) is an extinct genus of mackerel sharks that lived during the Cretaceous. It contains three valid species (one with two subspecies) which have been found in Europe, North America, and Australia. While it is mostly known from isolated teeth, an associated set of teeth, jaws, cranial fragments, and vertebrae of A. kopingensis is known from the Pierre Shale of Kansas. Teeth of A. k. judithensis were found with a plesiosaur skeleton with bite marks from the Judith River Formation of Montana. It was a medium-sized shark with an estimated total body length of 3–4 metres (9.8–13.1 ft).

Archaeolamna likely had an antitropical distribution, being found in the temperate waters of both hemispheres but absent from the tropical waters around the equator, much like the modern porbeagle shark. A similar distribution has been found for the related Cardabiodon.

== Taxonomy ==
When the family Archaeolamnidae was first named, it contained Archaeolamna, Cretodus, Dallasiella, and Telodontaspis. However, Cretodus was reassigned to Pseudoscapanorhynchidae, Dallasiella was reassigned to Lamniformes incertae sedis, and Telodontaspis was synonymized with Cretoxyrhina. This leaves Archaeolamna as the sole member of the family.
