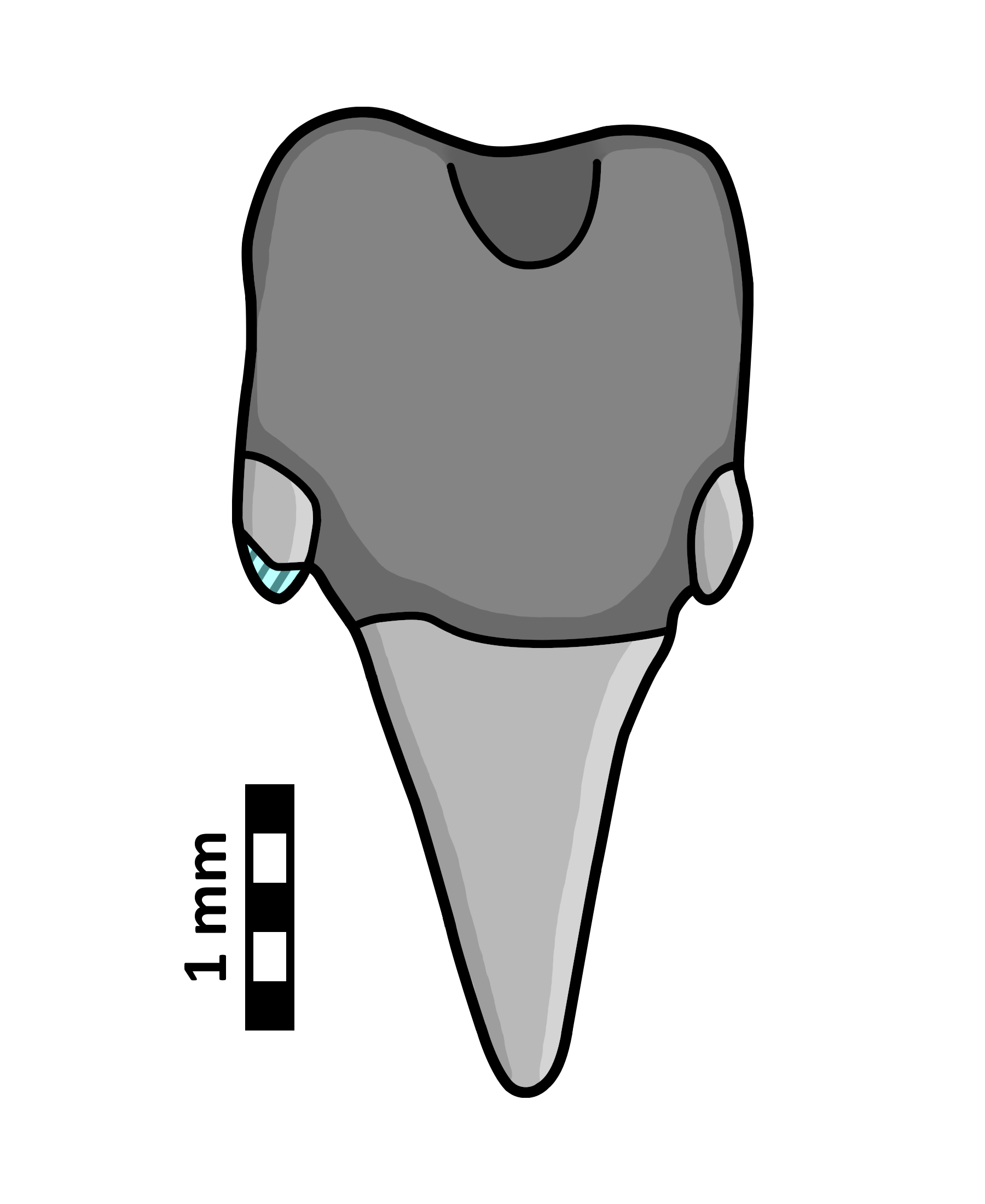
- Drawing of the holotype tooth

Scientific classification
- Kingdom: Animalia
- Phylum: Chordata
- Class: Chondrichthyes
- Subclass: Elasmobranchii
- Division: Selachii
- Order: Lamniformes
- Family: †Pseudoscapanorhynchidae
- Genus: †Lilamna; Greenfield, 2021

Type species
- †Lilamna apophysata (Li, 1997)

Synonyms
- Archaeolamna apophysata Li, 1997 (preoccupied by Archaeolamna Siverson, 1992)

= Lilamna =

Lilamna Temporal range: late Eocene? (possibly Cretaceous)

Extinct genus of sharks

Lilamna is an extinct genus of mackerel sharks from the Wulagen Formation of the Tarim Basin, China. It was originally named Archaeolamna apophysata, but that generic name was preoccupied by Archaeolamna kopingensis. Lilamna was named as a replacement in accordance with the rules of the International Code of Zoological Nomenclature. Although formerly assigned to the family Lamnidae, it is now considered to be a potential member of the family Pseudoscapanorhynchidae. Since this family is otherwise restricted to the Cretaceous, it is possible that the holotype tooth was reworked into the late Eocene sediments it was found in.
