= Pseudoscapanorhynchus =

Pseudoscapanorhynchus Temporal range: Albian-Turonian

Scientific classification
- Domain: Eukaryota
- Kingdom: Animalia
- Phylum: Chordata
- Class: Chondrichthyes
- Subclass: Elasmobranchii
- Division: Selachii
- Order: Lamniformes
- Family: †Pseudoscapanorhynchidae
- Genus: †Pseudoscapanorhynchus; Herman, 1977
- Species: †P. compressidens

Binomial name
- †Pseudoscapanorhynchus compressidens Herman, 1977

Extinct genus of sharks

Pseudoscapanorhynchus is an extinct genus of mackerel sharks that lived during the Cretaceous. It contains one valid species, P. compressidens. It has been found in Europe, Asia, and North America.
