= Eoptolamna =

Eoptolamna Temporal range: Barremian-Campanian

Scientific classification
- Kingdom: Animalia
- Phylum: Chordata
- Class: Chondrichthyes
- Subclass: Elasmobranchii
- Division: Selachii
- Order: Lamniformes
- Family: †Pseudoscapanorhynchidae
- Genus: †Eoptolamna; Kriwet, Klug, Canudo, & Cuenca-Bescos, 2008

Type species
- †Eoptolamna eccentrolopha Kriwet, Klug, Canudo, & Cuenca-Bescos, 2008

Other species
- †E. supracretacea Guinot, Underwood, Cappetta, & Ward, 2013

Extinct genus of sharks

Eoptolamna is an extinct genus of mackerel sharks that lived during the Cretaceous. It contains two valid species, E. eccentrolopha and E. supracretacea, which have been found in Europe and North Africa.
