= Dallasiella =

Dallasiella Temporal range: middle Cenomanian-early Campanian

Scientific classification
- Domain: Eukaryota
- Kingdom: Animalia
- Phylum: Chordata
- Class: Chondrichthyes
- Subclass: Elasmobranchii
- Division: Selachii
- Order: Lamniformes
- Family: †Cretoxyrhinidae
- Genus: †Dallasiella; Cappetta & Case, 1999

Type species
- †Dallasiella willistoni Cappetta & Case, 1999

Species
- †Dallasiella brachyodon Siversson, Cederström, & Ryan, 2022; †Dallasiella willistoni Cappetta & Case, 1999

Extinct genus of sharks

Dallasiella is an extinct genus of mackerel sharks that lived during the Late Cretaceous. It contains two valid species, D. willistoni and D. brachyodon, which have been found in North America and Europe. While formerly placed in the families Cretoxyrhinidae and Archaeolamnidae, it is now considered Lamniformes incertae sedis.
