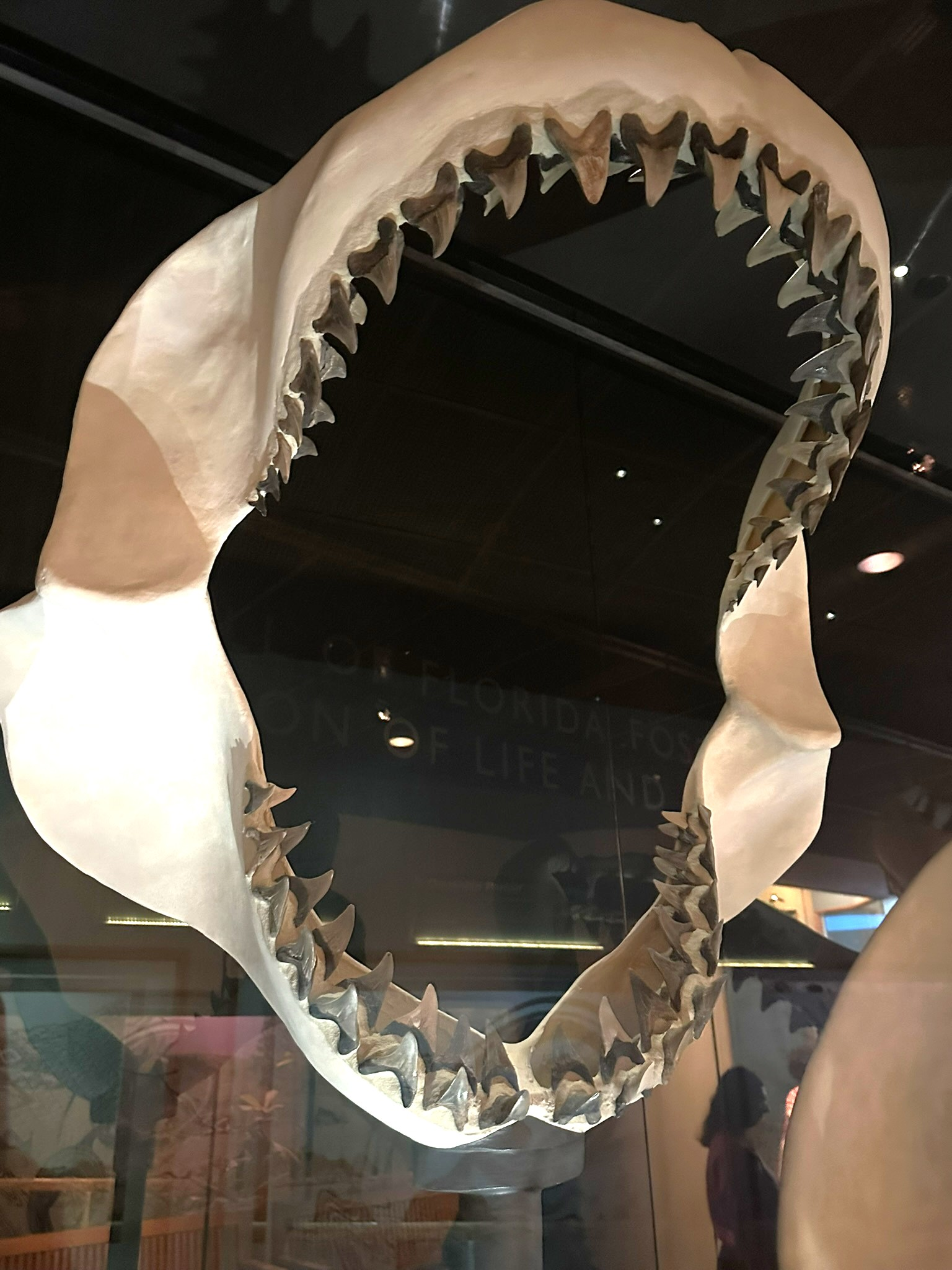
- Model of P. benedenii jaws, Florida Museum of Natural History

Scientific classification
- Kingdom: Animalia
- Phylum: Chordata
- Class: Chondrichthyes
- Subclass: Elasmobranchii
- Division: Selachii
- Order: Lamniformes
- Family: incertae sedis
- Genus: †Parotodus; Cappetta, 1980

Type species
- †Oxyrhina benedenii Le Hon, 1871

Species
- †P. benedenii (Le Hon, 1871); †P. pavlovi (Menner, 1928); †P. mangyshlakensis Kozlov, 1999

= Parotodus =

Parotodus Temporal range: Early Eocene - Pleistocene, 53.3–1.1 Ma

Extinct genus of sharks

Parotodus, commonly known as the false-toothed mako shark (or false mako shark), is an extinct genus of mackerel shark that lived approximately 53 to one million years ago during the Eocene and Pleistocene epochs. Its teeth, which are found worldwide, are often prized by fossil collectors due to their rarity. The scarcity of fossils is because Parotodus likely primarily inhabited open oceans far away from the continents. While the placement of Parotodus with the Lamniformes has been debated, most researchers agree it was probably a member of a now extinct shark clade, either an otodontid or a cardabiodont. In any case, it would have been the last members of either group. While originally being suspected of dying out at the very end of the Pliocene, fossils found in the Waccamaw Formation show that it made it to the Pleistocene. The body length of Parotodus is estimated to be maximum to about 7.6–9.2 m (25–30 ft) long. Parotodus was the largest shark and apex predator of its time.

== Description ==
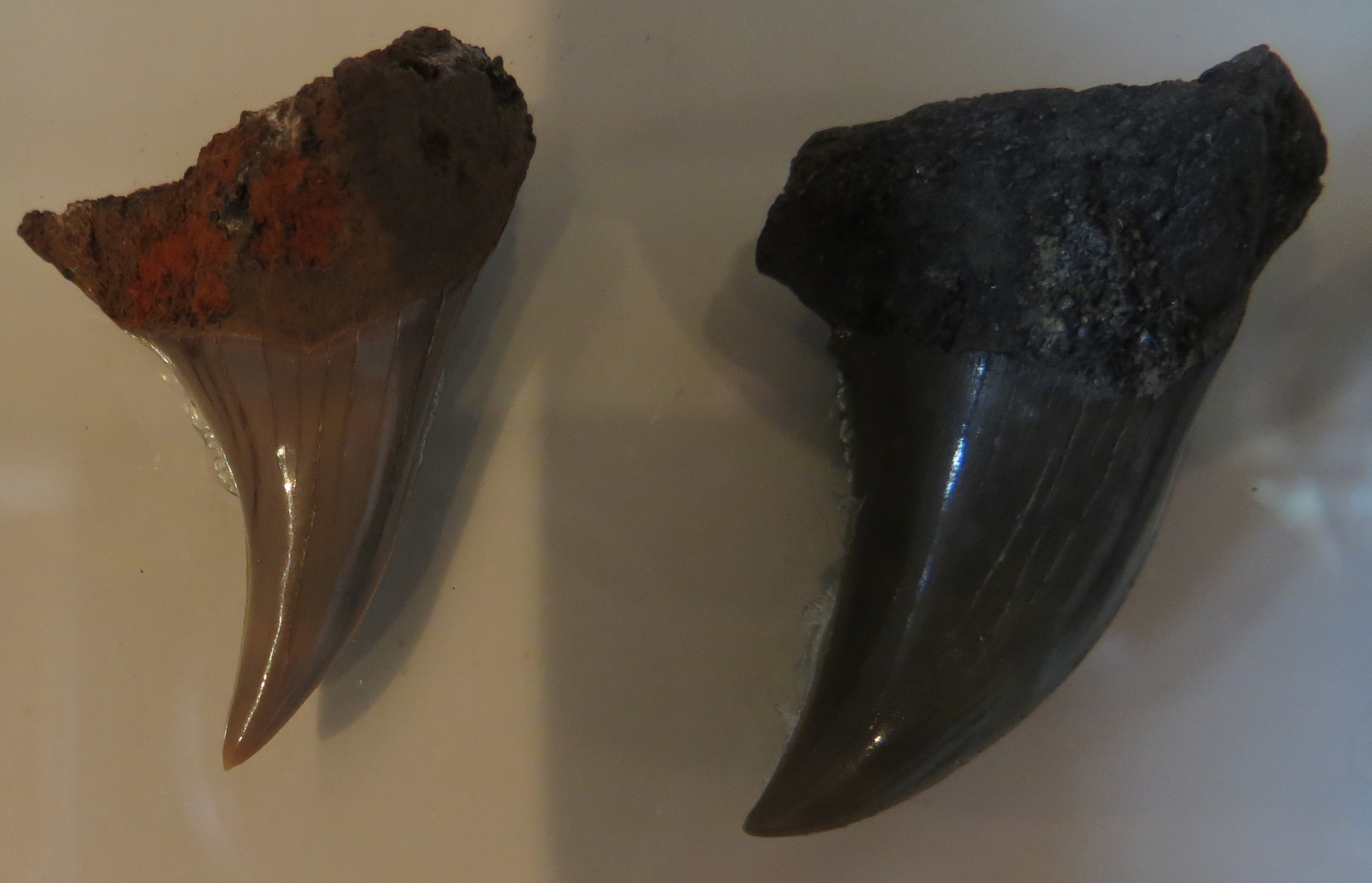
P. benedenii teeth, Naturalis Biodiversity Center

Initially appearing as a small shark, Parotodus gradually increased in size over geologic time and by the Neogene period became one of the largest sharks of its time. A 1999 study estimated the genus to have measured up to 7.6 m (25 ft) in length. The body shape is estimated to be sleek and streamlined, which is consistent with pelagic predatory sharks similar to modern great white shark or mako shark. However, due to the nature of cartilaginous fish, it is difficult to find body fossils, so this has not been confirmed to date.

=== Body size ===
The body length of Parotodus is estimated to have been 7.6–9.2 m (25–30 ft) long at maximum. Parotodus varied in size depending on the species; unlike the species that existed during the Eocene, which weighed between 1,000 kilograms (2,200 lb), P. benedenii is estimated to have weighed up to 4,400–5,000 kilograms (9,700–11,000 lb). P. benedenii was one of the largest sharks that inhabited the Miocene - Pliocene at the time.

== Paleoecology ==
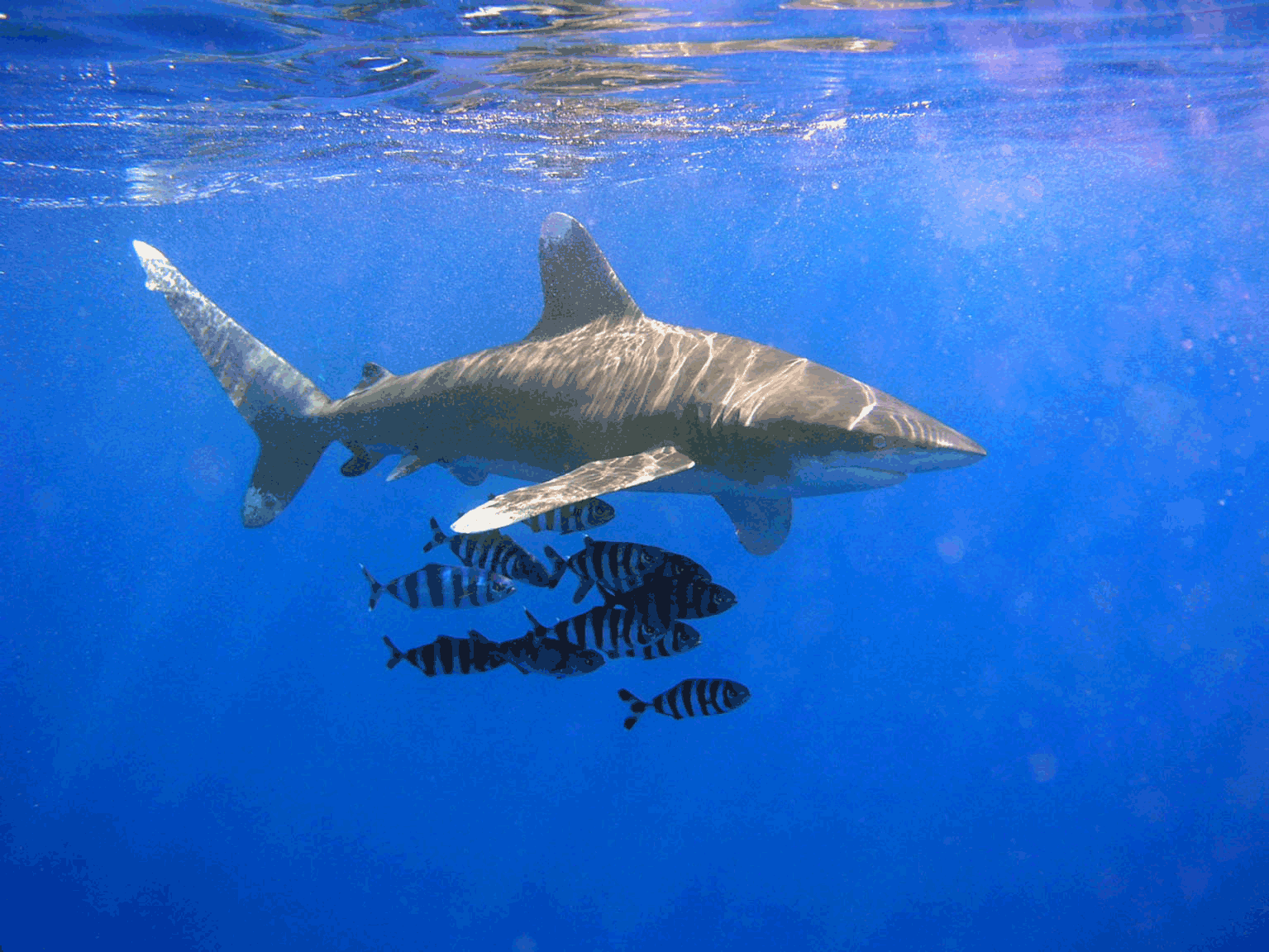
Parotodus inhabited pelagic open oceans like the oceanic whitetip shark.

P. benedenii was an open-ocean dweller and its paleoecology is poorly understood in the present. Teeth of P. benedenii are distinctively curved and lacking in compression fractures, these observations suggest that P. benedenii largely fed on soft-bodied prey including other sharks. Some paleontologists speculated that P. benedenii fed at a very high trophic level with a diet composed of other large-bodied sharks, but trophic partitioning with other large-bodied sharks is apparent.

== Classification ==
Due to the general scarcity and ambiguity of fossils, the familiar placement remains uncertain. Several proposals suggest classifying the genus as a mega-toothed shark, cardabiodont, archaeolamnid, thresher shark, or white shark.

Currently, three valid species are generally recognized within Parotodus. These include P. benedenii, P. pavlovi, and P. mangyshlakensis. However, some scientists, especially those who identify Parotodus as a cardabiodont, do not recognize the latter two as members of the genus.

A fourth species from the Oligocene of Japan was reported by Ward, Nakatani, and Bernard in a 2017 poster. The poster stated that the new species is to be named after Yasuhiro Fudouji, the paleontologist who discovered the type specimens, and will be formally described in an upcoming paper. However, the scientific name was not explicitly stated to avoid an accidental invalidation of the taxon.

== Fossil records ==
The genus is often regarded as a rare species despite its presence in ocean deposits worldwide. As a result, it is often prized by fossil collectors. Paleontologists believe that Parotodus likely inhabited primarily open oceans like the modern oceanic whitetip shark and blue shark. This would explain why fossils of a cosmopolitan animal are so rare, given that open oceans are seldom represented in terrestrial fossil deposits. This hypothesis is additionally supported by how Parotodus teeth are unusually common in nodule deposits under the Pacific and Indian Oceans and on islands located far away from continental lands.

Parotodus fossils have been recovered from fossil deposits in the Azores, Mallorca, Malta, Europe, Madagascar, Kazakhstan, Indonesia, Japan, South Korea, South Africa, New Zealand, Australia, Peru, Brazil, California, the East Coast of the United States, and dredged from the Pacific and Indian Oceans.

== See also ==
- List of prehistoric cartilaginous fish
