= Cardabiodontidae =

Cardabiodontidae Temporal range: Late Cretaceous

Scientific classification
- Kingdom: Animalia
- Phylum: Chordata
- Class: Chondrichthyes
- Subclass: Elasmobranchii
- Division: Selachii
- Order: Lamniformes
- Family: †Cardabiodontidae; Siverson, 1999

Genera
- †Cardabiodon; †Dwardius; †Parotodus?

Extinct family of sharks

Cardabiodontidae is an extinct family of lamniform sharks. Confirmed members of this family include Cardabiodon and Dwardius, both which are genera which existed in Australia, North America, and Europe during the Late Cretaceous period. It has been suggested that Parotodus could also belong to this family, but the authors that originally made this proposal expressed a weakening of rationale for it.
