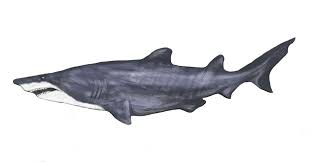

Scientific classification
- Kingdom: Animalia
- Phylum: Chordata
- Class: Chondrichthyes
- Subclass: Elasmobranchii
- Division: Selachii
- Order: Lamniformes
- Family: †Pseudoscapanorhynchidae
- Genus: †Leptostyrax; Williston, 1900

Type species
- †Leptostyrax macrorhiza (Cope, 1875)

Other species
- †L. stychi Schmitz, Thies, & Kriwet, 2010

Synonyms
- Genus synonymy: Macrorhizodon Sokolov, 1965; Megarhizodon Sokolov, 1978; Species synonymy: L. macrorhiza; Lamna macrorhiza Cope, 1875; Leptostyrax bicuspidatus Williston, 1900; Megarhizodon priscus Sokolov, 1978

= Leptostyrax =

Leptostyrax Temporal range: Barremian-Campanian

Extinct genus of sharks

Leptostyrax is an extinct genus of mackerel sharks that lived during the Cretaceous. It contains two valid species, L. macrorhiza and L. stychi, found in North America, Europe, Africa, and Australia. It is among the earliest known lamniforms which underwent an adaptive radiation in the Early Cretaceous.

== Paleobiology ==
Leptostyrax is only known from isolated teeth. However, vertebrae tentatively assigned to L. macrorhiza suggest lengths of 6.3–8.3 m (21–27 ft), making it potentially one of the largest Cretaceous sharks.

Leptostyrax had teeth similar to the modern sand tiger shark in having a tall, narrow primary cusp, and smaller secondary lateral cusps. This tearing type dentition suggests Leptostyrax preferred moderately large prey like bony fishes.
