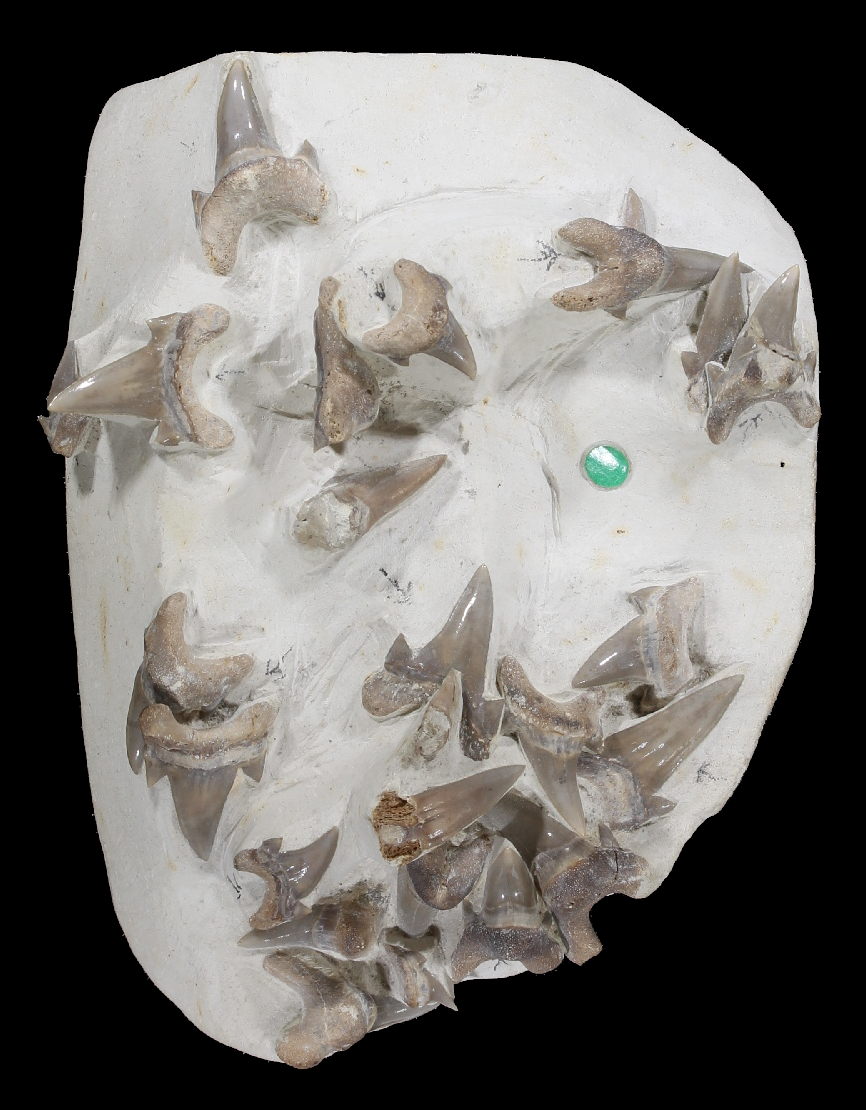
- Associated teeth of D. woodwardi (NHMUK PV OR 39053) from Cretaceous chalk in Kent, England

Scientific classification
- Kingdom: Animalia
- Phylum: Chordata
- Class: Chondrichthyes
- Subclass: Elasmobranchii
- Division: Selachii
- Order: Lamniformes
- Family: †Cardabiodontidae
- Genus: †Dwardius; Siverson, 1999

Type species
- †Lamna woodwardi (Herman, 1977)

Species
- †D. woodwardi (Herman, 1977); †D. siversoni Zhelezko, 2000; †D. sudindicus Underwood et al., 2011

= Dwardius =

Dwardius Temporal range: Cretaceous

Extinct genus of sharks

Dwardius is an extinct genus of cardabiodontid sharks which existed during the Cretaceous period in what is now Australia, England, France, and India. It was described by Mikael Siverson in 1999, as a new genus for the species Cretalamna woodwardi, which had been described by J. Hermann in 1977. Another species, D. siversoni, was described from the middle Albian of northeastern France by V.I. Zhelezko in 2000; the species epithet honours the author of the genus. A new species, D. sudindicus, was described by Charlie J. Underwood, Anjali Goswami, G.V.R. Prasad, Omkar Verma, and John J. Flynn in 2011, from the Cretaceous Karai Formation of India.
