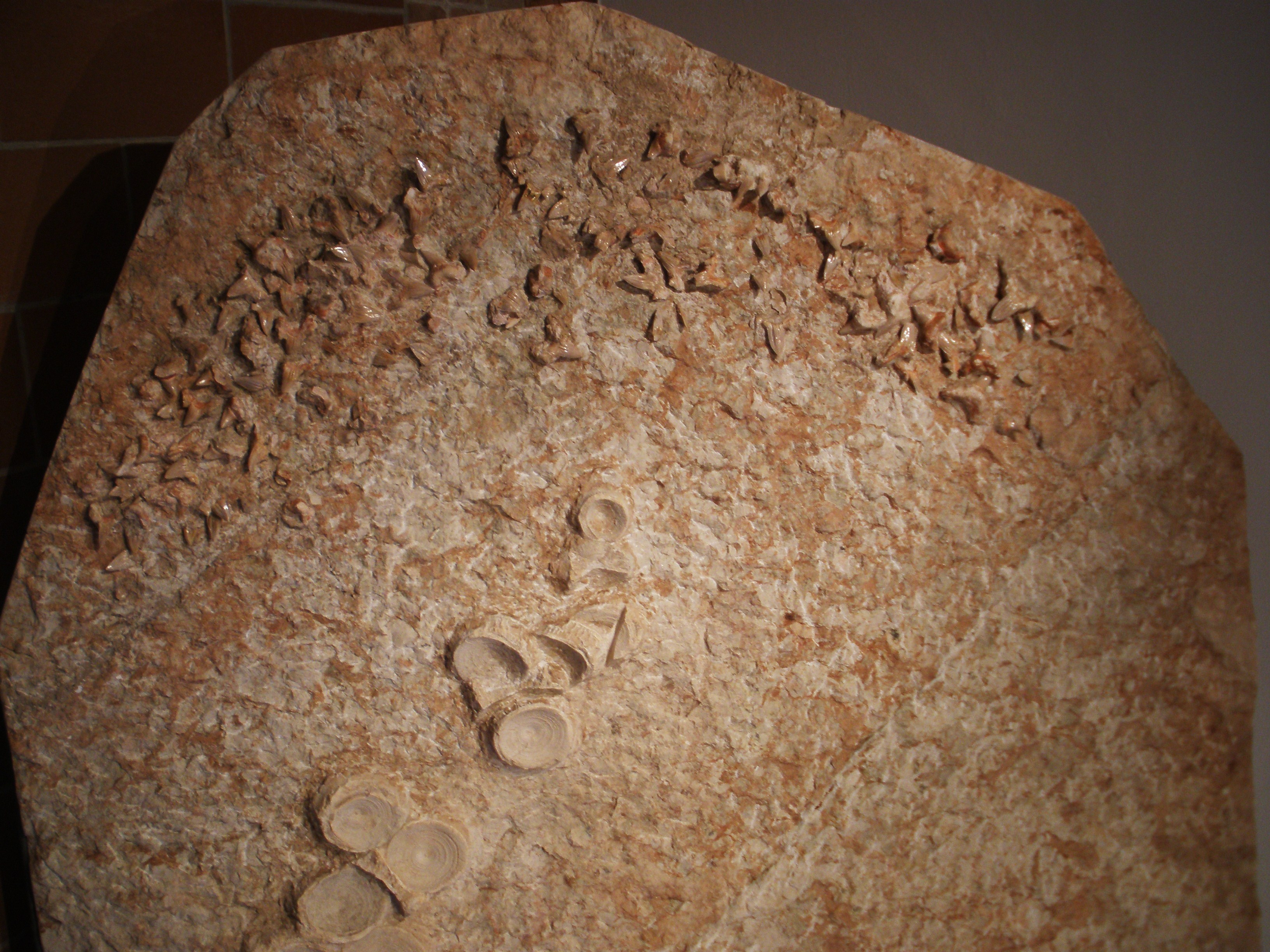
- Teeth and vertebrae of Cretodus

Scientific classification
- Kingdom: Animalia
- Phylum: Chordata
- Class: Chondrichthyes
- Subclass: Elasmobranchii
- Division: Selachii
- Order: Lamniformes
- Family: †Pseudoscapanorhynchidae; Herman, 1979

Genera
- †Cretodus?; †Eoptolamna?; †Leptostyrax; †Lilamna?; †Protolamna?; †Pseudoscapanorhynchus

Synonyms
- Cretodontidae Zhelezko in Zhelezko & Kozlov, 1999; Eoptolamnidae? Kriwet et al., 2008

= Pseudoscapanorhynchidae =

Pseudoscapanorhynchidae Temporal range: Valanginian-Maastrichtian (possible Eocene occurrence)

Family of fishes

Pseudoscapanorhynchidae is a family of extinct mackerel sharks that lived during the Cretaceous and potentially the Paleogene. It currently includes Cretodus, Eoptolamna, Leptostyrax, Protolamna, Pseudoscapanorhynchus, and possibly Lilamna.
