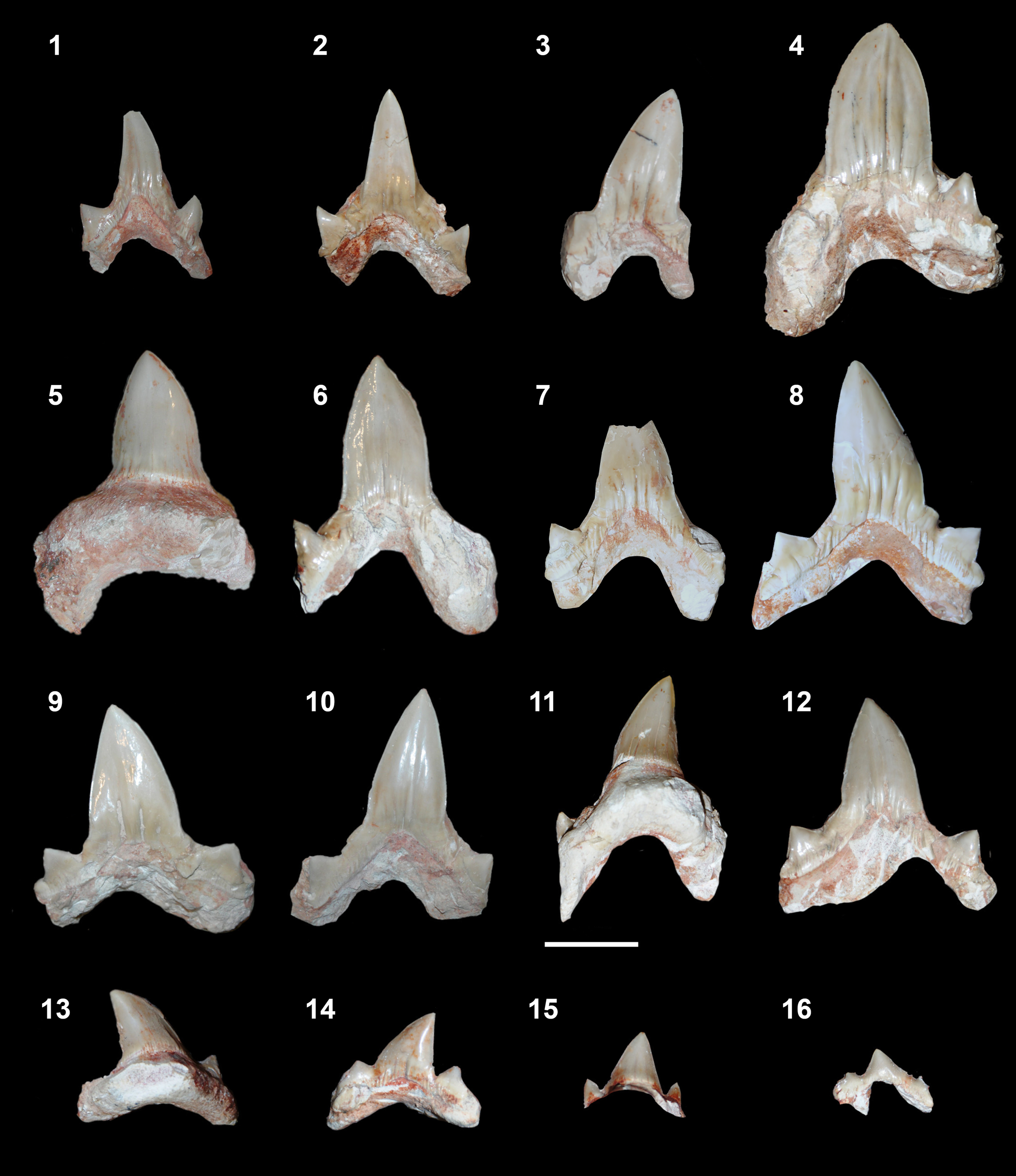
- C. crassidens teeth from the Turonian of Italy

Scientific classification
- Kingdom: Animalia
- Phylum: Chordata
- Class: Chondrichthyes
- Subclass: Elasmobranchii
- Division: Selachii
- Order: Lamniformes
- Family: †Pseudoscapanorhynchidae
- Genus: †Cretodus; Sokolov, 1965

Type species
- †Cretodus crassidens Dixon, 1850

Species
- †C. crassidens Dixon, 1850; †C. semiplicatus Agassiz, 1843; †C. longiplicatus Werner, 1989; †C. gigantea Case, 2001; †C. houghtonorum Shimada & Everhart, 2019

= Cretodus =

Cretodus Temporal range: Cenomanian - Coniacian

Extinct genus of sharks

Cretodus is an extinct genus of large mackerel sharks belonging to the proposed family Pseudoscapanorhynchidae. Cretodus lived during the Late Cretaceous, ranging from the Cenomanian to the Coniacian (approximately 100 to 89 million years ago). The genus is well-known from strata deposited in the Western Interior Seaway (North America), and from the Late Cretaceous of Europe, Africa, and possibly Asia. Cretodus is primarily represented in the fossil record by isolated teeth and vertebral centra, though a couple of associated dentitions and vertebral columns have been found.

== Description ==
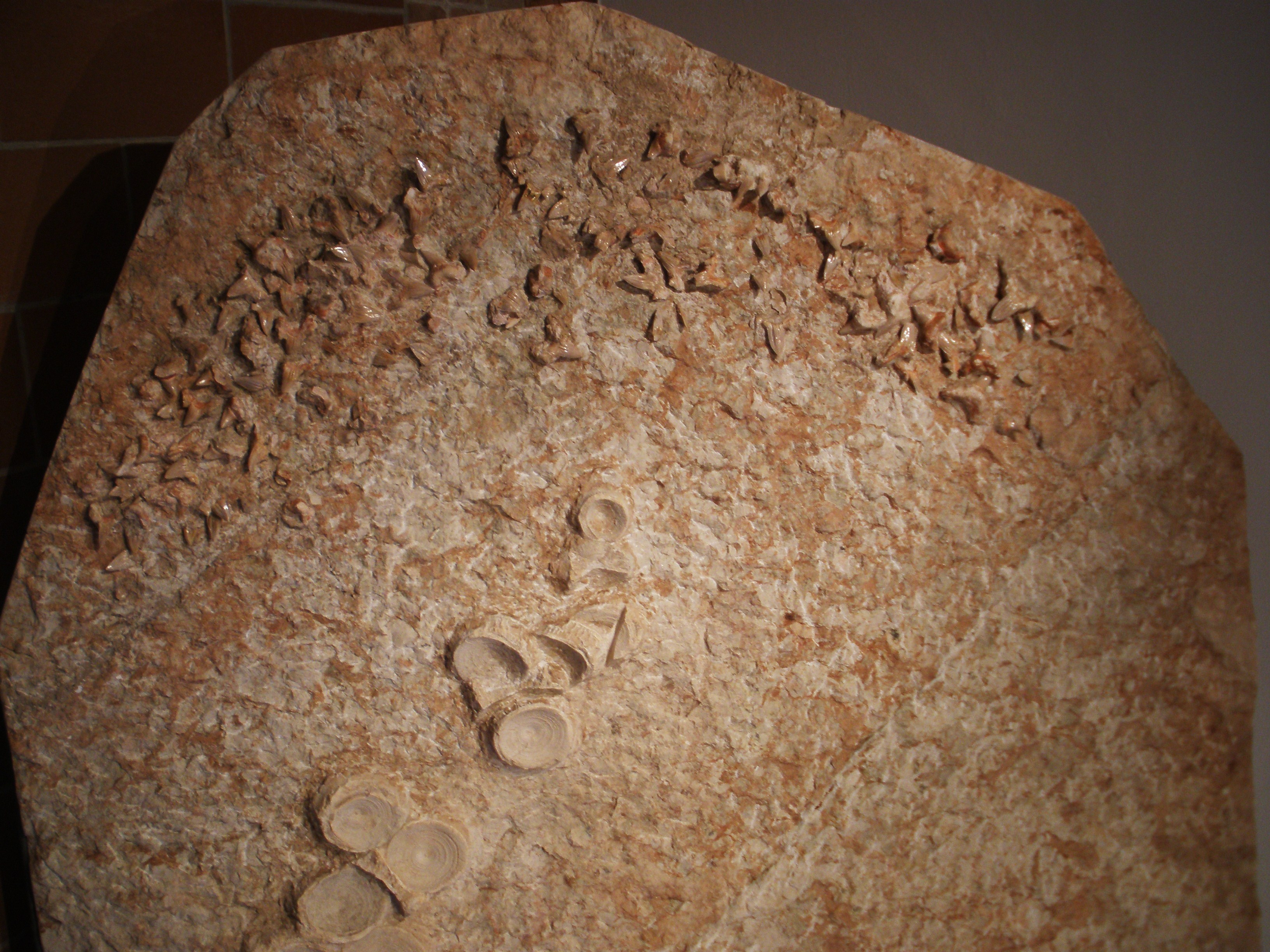
Vertebrae and teeth of C.crassidens

Prior to 2017, Cretodus was mainly known from isolated teeth. The discovery of a virtually complete skeleton suggests the genus possessed a body similar in form to the modern tiger shark, with a wide head that was equipped with powerful jaws, and a stout body. The morphology of Cretodus' placoid scales and vertebral centra suggest a moderate swimming speed, less than that of the fast-cruising contemporaneous macropredatory shark, Cretoxyrhina.

Size estimation is only reasonable for the few associated partial skeletons known. Shimada & Everhart (2019) reported an approximate total length of 5.15 m (16.9 ft) for the associated specimen of C. houghtonorum from Kansas which probably died at 22 years of age; they also suggested that the maximum total length of C. houghtonorum would have been 6.84 m (22.4 ft). Amalfitano et al. (2022) reported an estimated total length of 6.6–7.8 m (22–26 ft) for a nearly complete specimen of C. crassidens from Italy which probably died at 23 years of age; they also fitted a van Bertalanffy growth model based on the growth record of this specimen, estimating the parameter of theoretical maximum total length (L∞) for C. crassidens at 9.55–11.28 m (31.3–37.0 ft).

=== Dentition ===
Cretodus teeth have lateral cusplets that are much smaller than the main cusp and well-separated from it, but connected by enamel on the labial face. The enamel surface is smooth, except near the base of the crown, where it forms vertical striae or costulae (grooves and ridges), a feature more prominent on the lingual face. The root is bilobate and has a massive shelf-like lingual root protuberance which diminishes in size in posterior positions.

=== Growth ===
It is estimated that C. houghtonorum was about 1.18 m (3.9 ft) long at birth, became sexually mature at 10 to 15 years of age, and reached its maximum lifespan at 51 to 55 years of age. C. crassidens was about 1.42 m (4.7 ft) long at birth, became sexually mature at 12 to 17 years of age, and reached its maximum life span at 64 years of age.

== Paleoecology ==
Cretodus predated on large prey, and is suggested to have specialized in marine turtles, based on inferred stomach contents (a 2 m (6.6 ft) chelonioid turtle) of a specimen of C. crassidens found in Italy. A predator-prey relationship has also been inferred between C. houghtonorum and hybodont sharks based on stomach contents.

The distribution of fossils of C. crassidens suggests a largely cosmopolitan distribution and a preference for offshore areas in contrast with other species in the genus (e.g. C. houghtonorum), which preferred shallow water.

Within the Western Interior Seaway, Cretodus lived among a number of other genera of shark including Cretoxyrhina, Squalicorax, Ptychodus, Cretalamna, Scapanorhynchus, and hybodont sharks. In order to coexist, these sharks likely practiced resource partitioning, by occupying different regions (e.g. nearshore v.s. offshore) or specializing in different prey items.

== Species ==
Shimada & Everhart (2019) attributed the following species to the genus, asserting they were chronospecies belonging to three grades of crown broadness.

- Cretodus longiplicatus
- Cretodus semiplicatus
- Cretodus gigantea
- Cretodus houghtonorum
- Cretodus crassidens
