= List of the Paleozoic life of Kansas =

This list of the Paleozoic life of Kansas contains the various prehistoric life-forms whose fossilized remains have been reported from within the US state of Kansas and are between 538.8 and 252.17 million years of age.

== A ==
- †Acanthocladia
  - †Acanthocladia guadalupensis
  - †Acanthocladia lepidodendroides
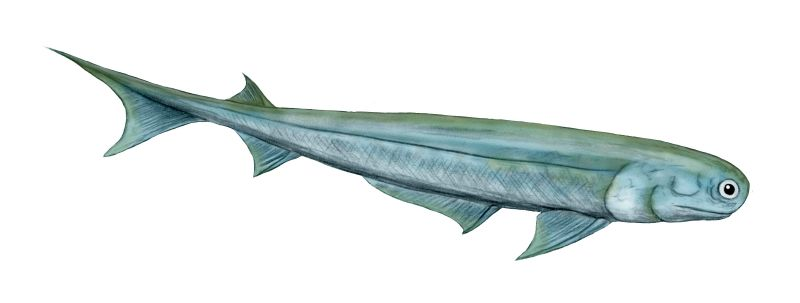
- Life restoration of the Early Devonian-Permian "spiny shark" Acanthodes
  †Acanthodes
- †Acanthopecten
  - †Acanthopecten carboniferous
- †Achistrum
  - †Achistrum brownwoodensis
- †Acitheca
  - †Acitheca polymorpha
- †Aclisina
- †Acratia
  - †Acratia typica
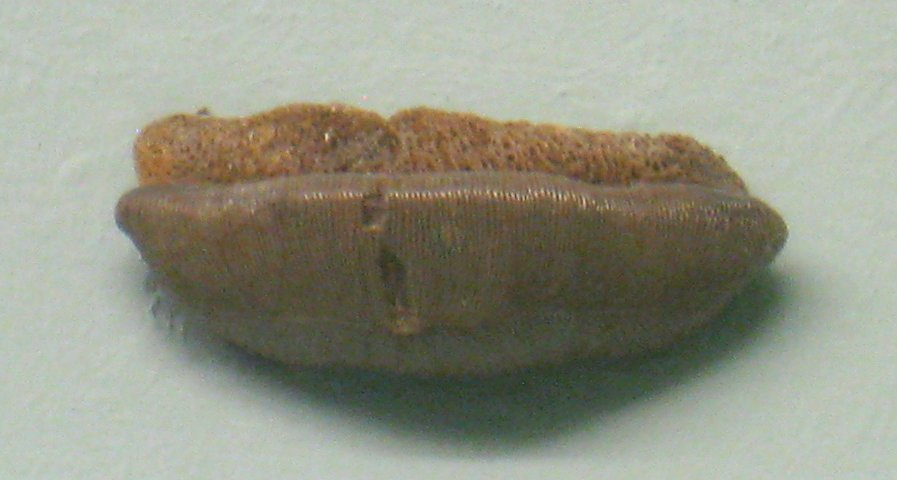
- Fossilized teeth of the Permian-Paleocene cartilaginous fish Acrodus
  †Acrodus – tentative report
- †Acroplous
  - †Acroplous vorax
- †Actiobates – type locality for genus
  - †Actiobates peabodyi – type locality for species
- †Aculeispores
  - †Aculeispores variabilis
- †Adlatipora
- †Agassizodus
  - †Agassizodus variabilis
- †Agetopanorpa – type locality for genus
  - †Agetopanorpa maculata – type locality for species
- †Aglaocrinus
  - †Aglaocrinus cranei – type locality for species
- †Ahrensisporites
- †Aibolitus
  - †Aibolitus minutus – type locality for species
- †Alatisporites
  - †Alatisporites hexalatus
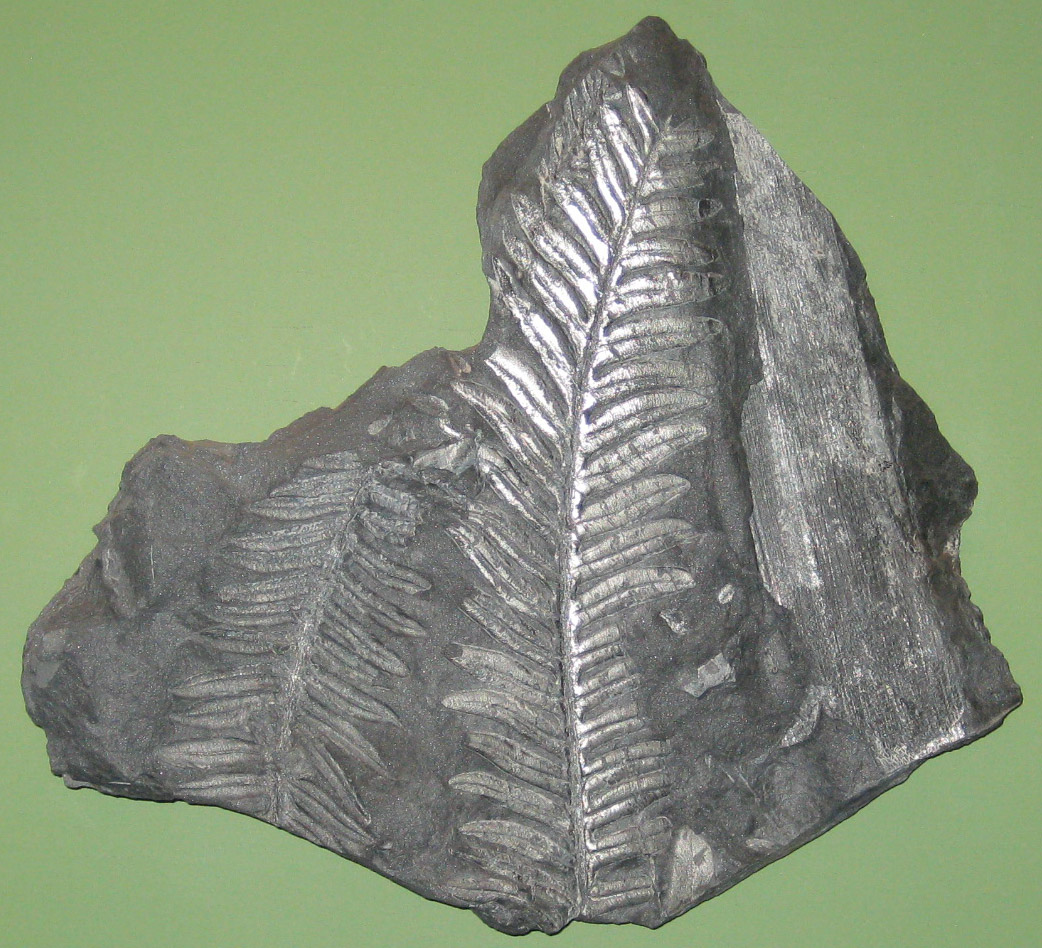
- Fossilized fronds of the Carboniferous-Early Cretaceous seed fern Alethopteris
  †Alethopteris
  - †Alethopteris grandini
  - †Alethopteris serlii
  - †Alethopteris sullivanti
- †Alisporites
  - †Alisporites plicatus
  - †Alisporites zapfei
- †Alloiopteris
- †Allorisma
  - †Allorisma altirostrata – type locality for species
- †Amelacanthus
- †Ameura
  - †Ameura missouriensis
- Ammodiscus – tentative report
- †Amphiscapha
  - †Amphiscapha muricata
- †Amphissites
  - †Amphissites centronotus
  - †Amphissites dattonensis
- † Ananias – tentative report
  - †Ananias welleri – type locality for species
- †Anapiculatisporites
  - †Anapiculatisporites grandensis
  - †Anapiculatisporites grundensis
- †Anelcana – type locality for genus
  - †Anelcana dilatata – type locality for species
- †Anematina
- †Angulisporites
  - †Angulisporites splendidus
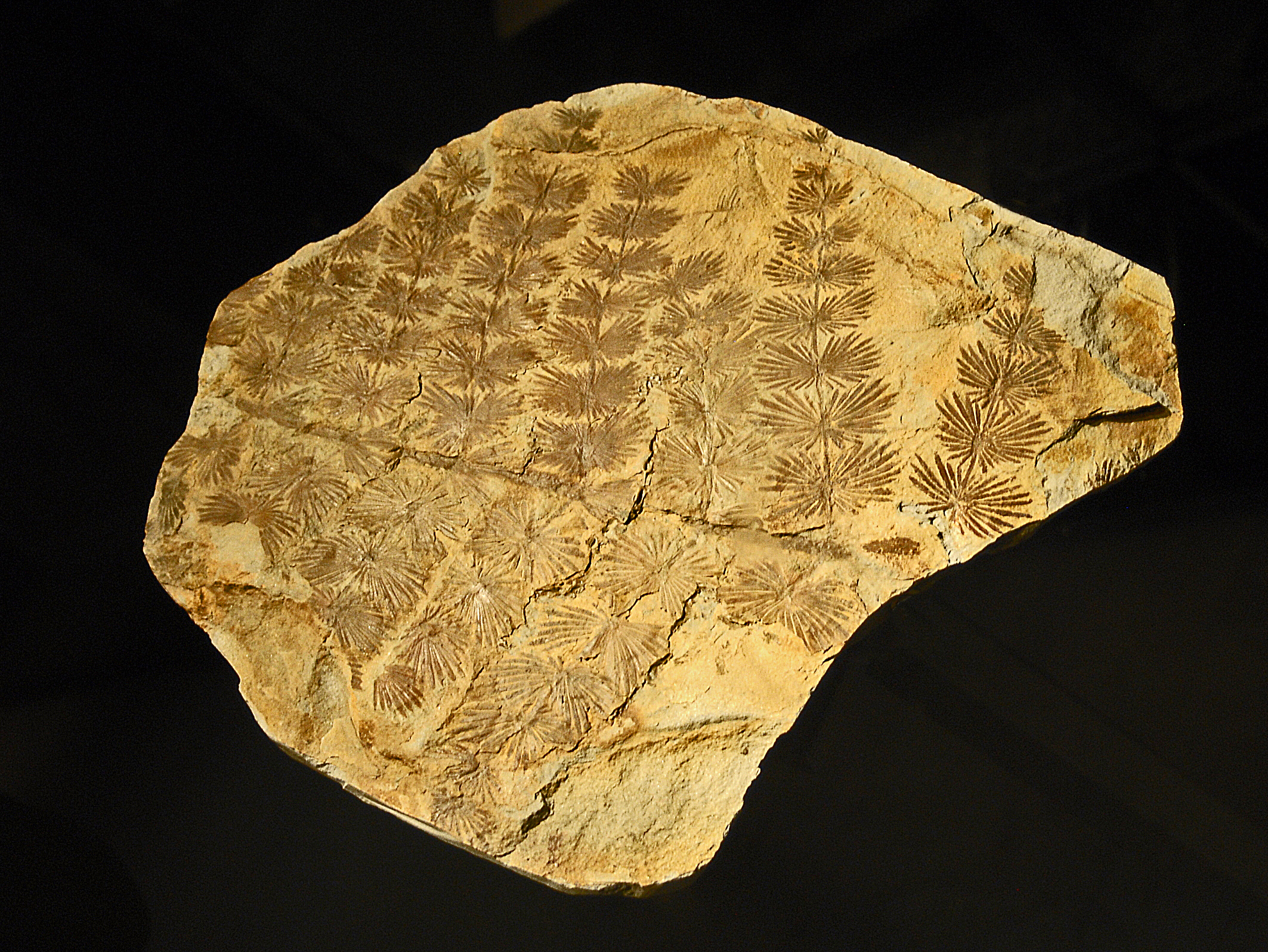
- Fossil of the Carboniferous horsetail relative Annularia
  †Annularia
  - †Annularia asteris
  - †Annularia mucronata
  - †Annularia vernensis
- †Anomalogramma – type locality for genus
  - †Anomalogramma parva – type locality for species
- †Anormochorista – type locality for genus
  - †Anormochorista oligoclada – type locality for species
- †Anthracomartus
- †Anthraconeilo
- †Anthraconeilopis
  - †Anthraconeilopis kansana
- †Anthraconeilopsis – tentative report
  - †Anthraconeilopsis kansana
- †Anthracospirifer
  - †Anthracospirifer occiduus
- †Antiquatonia
  - †Antiquatonia portlockianus
- †Apheloneura – type locality for genus
  - †Apheloneura amplia – type locality for species
  - †Apheloneura minutissima – type locality for species
- †Aphlebia
- †Apiculatasporites
  - †Apiculatasporites compactus
  - †Apiculatasporites latigranifer
  - †Apiculatasporites setulosus
  - †Apiculatasporites spinulistratus
- †Apiculatisporites
- †Apographiocrinus
- †Apsidoneura – type locality for genus
  - †Apsidoneura flexa – type locality for species
- †Araeonema
- †Araucarites – tentative report
- Archaeolithophyllum
- †Archaeophiomusium
  - †Archaeophiomusium burrisi
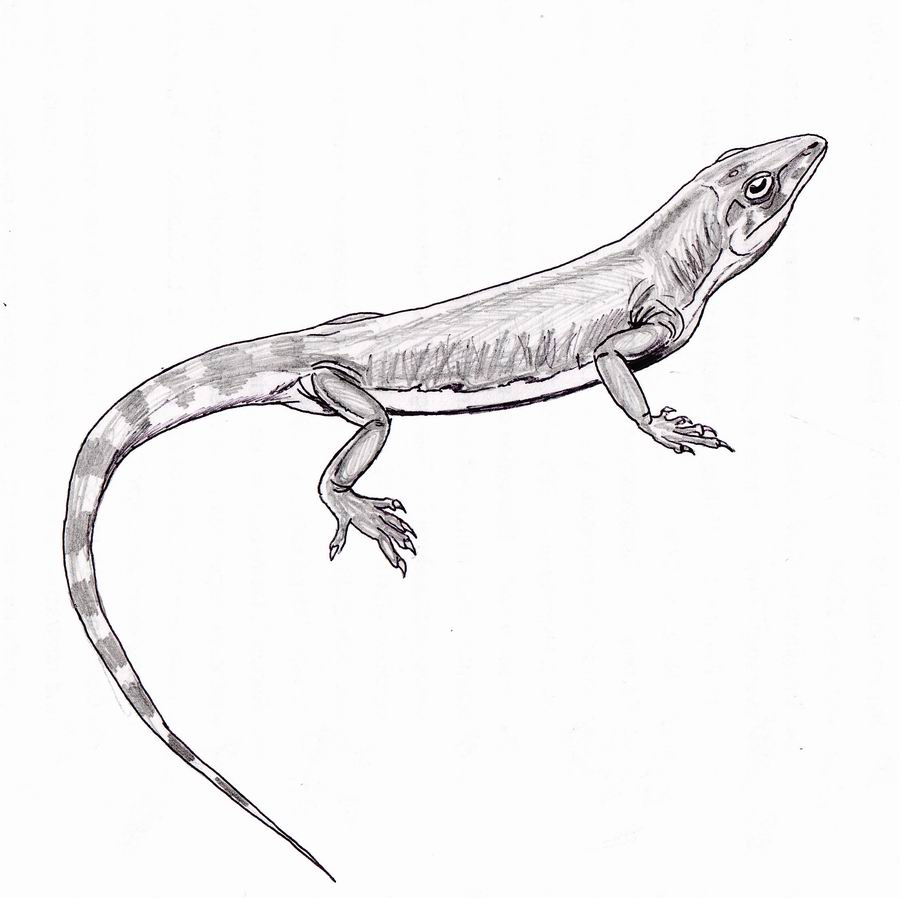
- Life restoration of the Carboniferous synapsid (mammal precursor) Archaeovenator
  †Archaeovenator – type locality for genus
  - †Archaeovenator hamiltonensis – type locality for species
- †Archelytron – type locality for genus
  - †Archelytron superbum – type locality for species
- †Archescytina – type locality for genus
  - †Archescytina kansasensis – type locality for species
  - †Archescytina muiri – type locality for species
  - †Archescytina permiana – type locality for species
- †Archimylacris
  - †Archimylacris recta – type locality for species
- †Aristoceras
  - †Aristoceras caddoense – or unidentified comparable form
- †Artinska – type locality for genus
  - †Artinska clara – type locality for species
  - †Artinska ovata – type locality for species
  - †Artinska sellardsi – type locality for species
- †Artinskia
  - †Artinskia whortani – type locality for species
- †Artisia
- †Astartella
  - †Astartella concentrica
- †Asterophyllites
  - †Asterophyllites equisetiformis
  - †Asterophyllites longifolius
- †Asterotheca
  - †Asterotheca arborescens
  - †Asterotheca hemiteloides – or unidentified comparable form
  - †Asterotheca miltoni – or unidentified comparable form
- †Asthenohymen – type locality for genus
  - †Asthenohymen affinis – type locality for species
  - †Asthenohymen dunbari – type locality for species
  - †Asthenohymen gracilis – type locality for species
  - †Asthenohymen kansasensis – type locality for species
  - †Asthenohymen pusillus – type locality for species
  - †Asthenohymen stenobasis – type locality for species
  - †Asthenohymen stigmatizans – type locality for species
- †Atava – type locality for genus
  - †Atava ovata – type locality for species
- †Aurikirkbya
  - †Aurikirkbya canyonensis
  - †Aurikirkbya wymani – type locality for species
- †Aviculipinna – tentative report
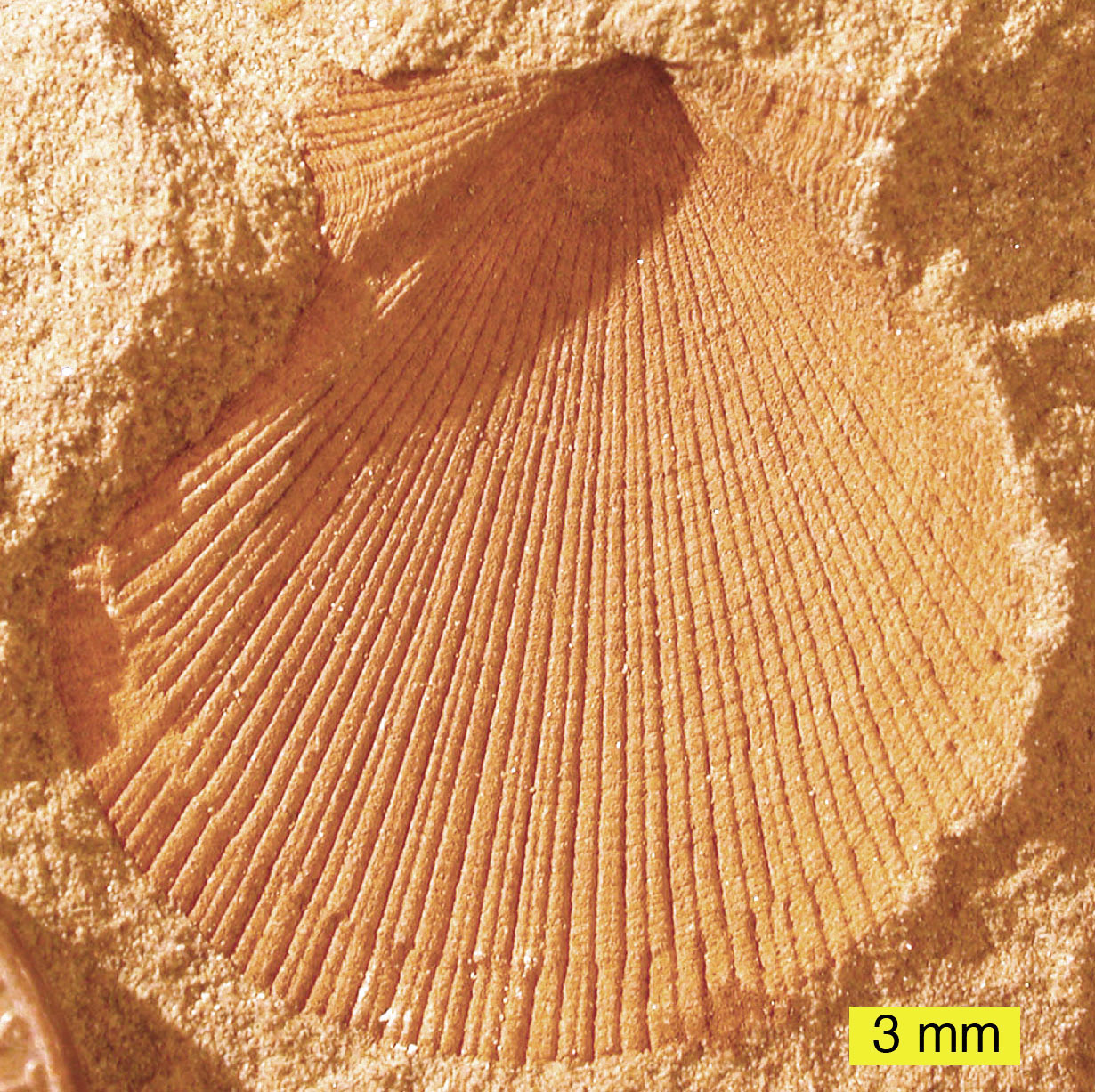
- Mold fossil of a shell of the Early Devonian-Late Triassic bivalve Aviculopecten
  †Aviculopecten
  - †Aviculopecten arctisulcatus
  - †Aviculopecten mccoyi – type locality for species
  - †Aviculopecten nodocosta
  - †Aviculopecten nodocostata
  - †Aviculopecten occidentalis
  - †Aviculopecten peculiaris – type locality for species
  - †Aviculopecten rectilaterarius
  - †Aviculopecten sumnerensis – type locality for species
- †Aviculopinna
  - †Aviculopinna peracuta
- †Axophyllum –

== B ==
- †Bactrites
- Bairdia
  - †Bairdia beedei – type locality for species
  - †Bairdia chasae – type locality for species
  - †Bairdia crassa
  - †Bairdia florenaensis
  - †Bairdia folgeri
  - †Bairdia forakerensis – type locality for species
  - †Bairdia garrisonensis
  - †Bairdia geisi – type locality for species
  - †Bairdia grahamensis – type locality for species
  - †Bairdia hassi
  - †Bairdia hoffmanae – type locality for species
  - †Bairdia hooverae – type locality for species
  - †Bairdia hurwitzi
  - †Bairdia kansasensis – type locality for species
  - †Bairdia kanwakensis – type locality for species
  - †Bairdia nevensis – type locality for species
  - †Bairdia perincerta – type locality for species
  - †Bairdia pompilioides
  - †Bairdia powersi – type locality for species
  - †Bairdia pseudoglennensis – type locality for species
  - †Bairdia radlerae – type locality for species
  - †Bairdia reussiana
  - †Bairdia seminalis
  - †Bairdia symmetrica
  - †Bairdia verwiebei – type locality for species
  - †Bairdia whortani – type locality for species
- †Balteosporites
  - †Balteosporites minutus
- †Basslerella – type locality for genus
  - †Basslerella crassa – type locality for species
  - †Basslerella firma – type locality for species
  - †Basslerella obesa – type locality for species
  - †Basslerella rothi – type locality for species
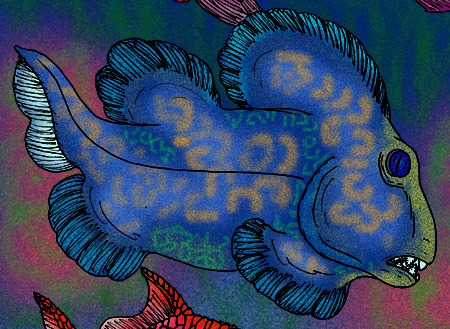
- Restoration of the Carboniferous Chimaera relative Belantsea
  †Belantsea – or unidentified comparable form
  - †Belantsea occidentalis
- †Bellerophon
  - †Bellerophon graphicus – type locality for species
  - †Bellerophon singularis – type locality for species
- †Blattelytron – type locality for genus
  - †Blattelytron permianum – type locality for species
- †Blattinopsis
  - †Blattinopsis kukalovae – type locality for species
- †Blattoidea
  - †Blattoidea juvenis – type locality for species
- †Bobbodus
  - †Bobbodus schaefferi
- †Boesites
  - †Boesites texanus
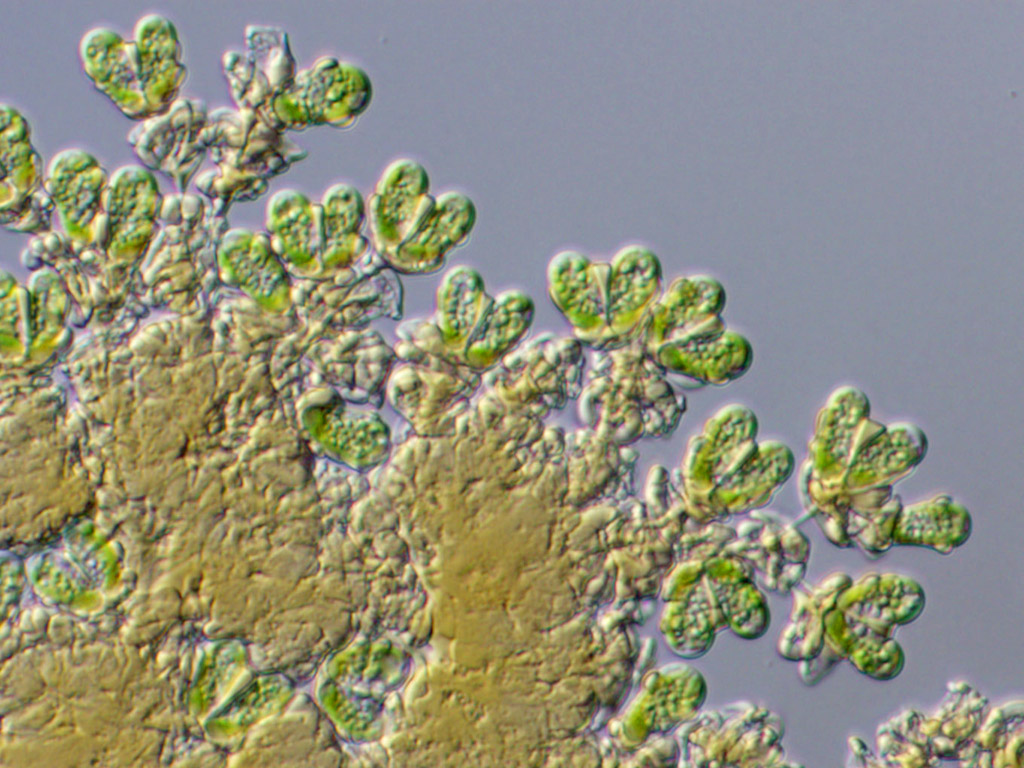
- Living Botryococcus green algae
  †Botryococcus
  - †Botryococcus braunii
- †Bradyina
- †Bransonella
- †Bucanopsis
- †Bythiacanthus
- Bythocypris
  - †Bythocypris osagensis – type locality for species

== C ==
- †Cadiospora
  - †Cadiospora magna
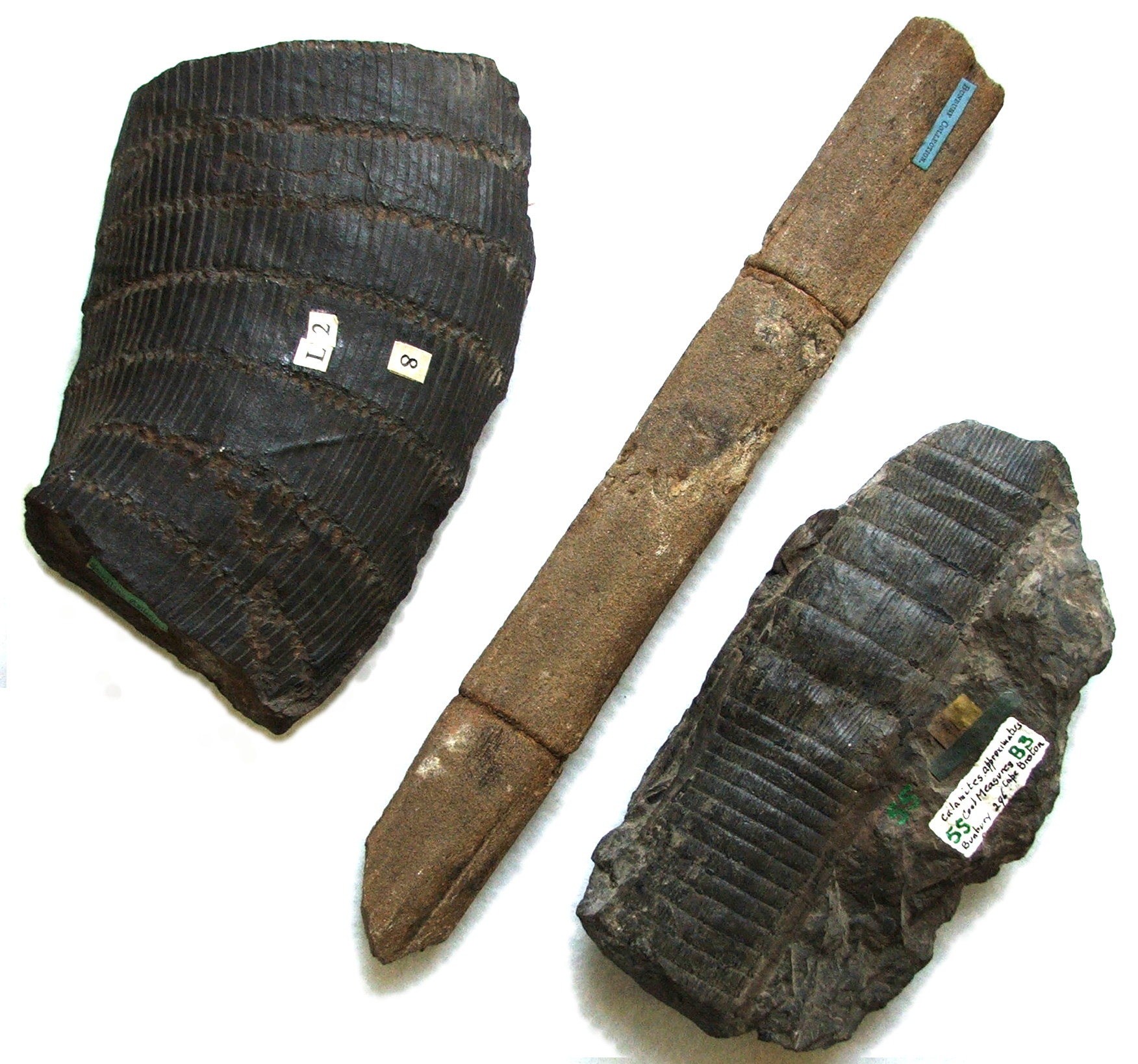
- Fossilized stems from the Carboniferous-Permian horsetail relative Calamites
  †Calamites
  - †Calamites cistii
- †Calamocarpon
  - †Calamocarpon insignis
- †Calamospora
  - †Calamospora breviradiata
  - †Calamospora flexilis
  - †Calamospora hartungiana
  - †Calamospora mutabilis
  - †Calamospora pedata
  - †Calamospora pusilla
  - †Calamospora straminea
- †Callipteris
  - †Callipteris conferta
  - †Callipteris curretiensis – or unidentified comparable form
  - †Callipteris flabellifera
  - †Callipteris goepperti – or unidentified comparable form
  - †Callipteris jutieri – or unidentified comparable form
  - †Callipteris lyratifolia – tentative report
  - †Callipteris oxydata
  - †Callipteris scheibei
  - †Callipteris subauriculata
  - †Callipteris whitei
- †Callistophyton
- †Calvertiella – type locality for genus
  - †Calvertiella permiana – type locality for species
- †Camptotaxineura – type locality for genus
  - †Camptotaxineura ephialtes – type locality for species
- †Camptotriletes
- †Cancrinella
  - †Cancrinella boonensis
- †Carbonita – tentative report
  - †Carbonita tumida
- †Carinostrobus – type locality for genus
  - †Carinostrobus foresmani – type locality for species
- †Carpolithes
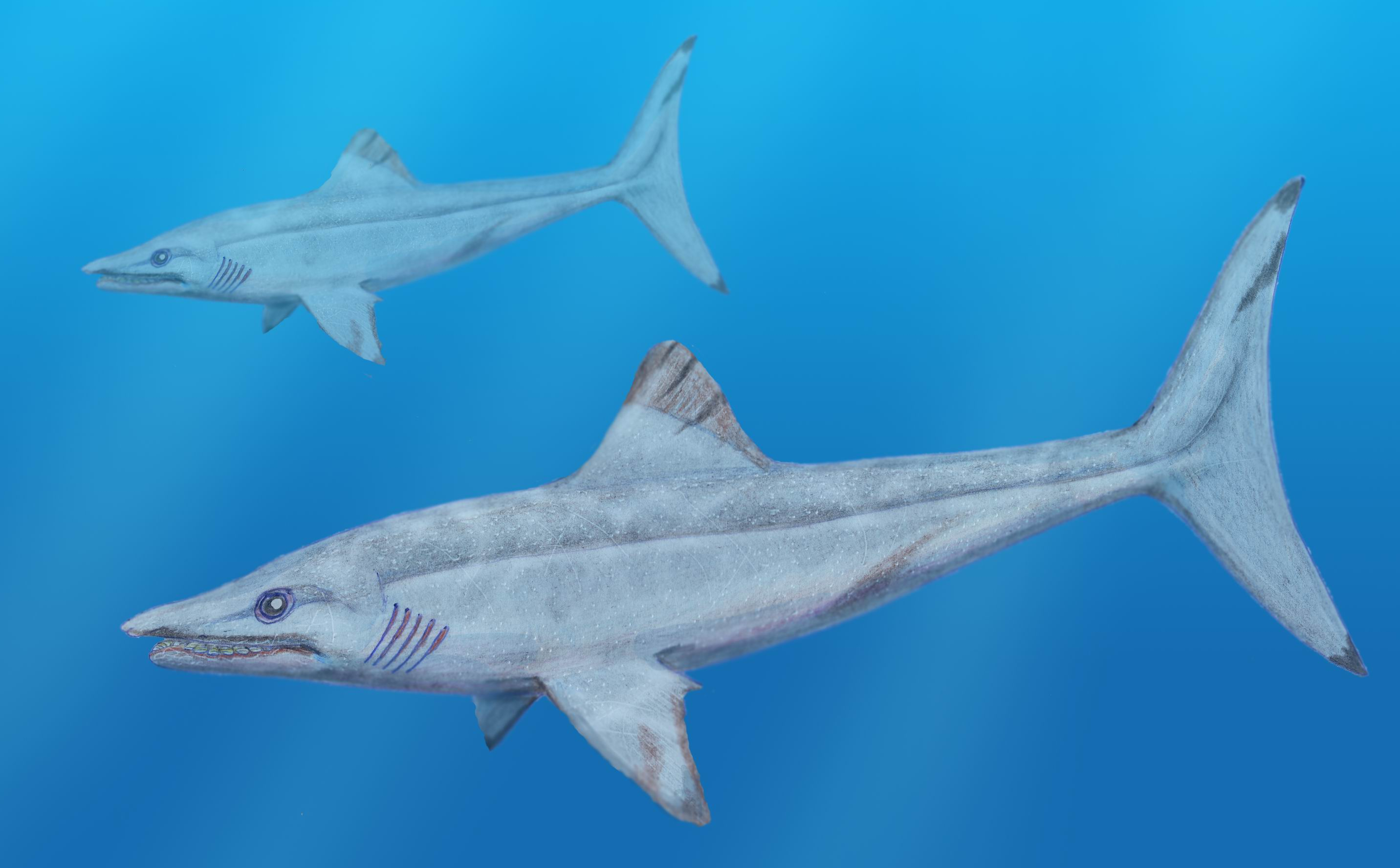
- Life restoration of the Carboniferous Chimaera relative Caseodus
  †Caseodus
  - †Caseodus eatoni
- †Caulopteris
- †Cavellina
  - †Cavellina chasensis – type locality for species
  - †Cavellina edmistonae
  - †Cavellina fittsi – type locality for species
  - †Cavellina marmorea – type locality for species
  - †Cavellina nebrascensis
- †Centonites
  - †Centonites symmetricus
- †Chaenomya
  - †Chaenomya leavenworthensis – tentative report
- †Chaetetes
  - †Chaetetes milleporaceous
- †Chelopterum
  - †Chelopterum peregrinum
- †Chomatodus
- †Chonetella
  - †Chonetella flemingi
- †Chonetes
  - †Chonetes decipiens
  - †Chonetes euampygus
  - †Chonetes lioderma
  - †Chonetes mesoloba
- †Chonetina
  - †Chonetina flemingii
- †Chonetinella
- †Choristosialis – type locality for genus
  - †Choristosialis enigmatica – type locality for species
- †Cibolocrinus
- †Circulichnis
  - †Circulichnis montanus
- †Cirratriradites
  - †Cirratriradites annulatus
  - †Cirratriradites annuliformis
  - †Cirratriradites maculatus
- Fossilized tooth of the shark Cladodus
  †Cladodus
- Cladophlebis
  - †Cladophlebis tenuis – or unidentified comparable form
- †Clavicosta – type locality for genus
  - †Clavicosta echinata – type locality for species
- †Cleiothyridina
  - †Cleiothyridina orbicularis
- †Climacammina
- †Clinopistha
- †Colpites – tentative report
  - †Colpites monilifera
- †Columinisporites
  - †Columinisporites ovalis
- †Complexisporites
  - †Complexisporites polymorphus
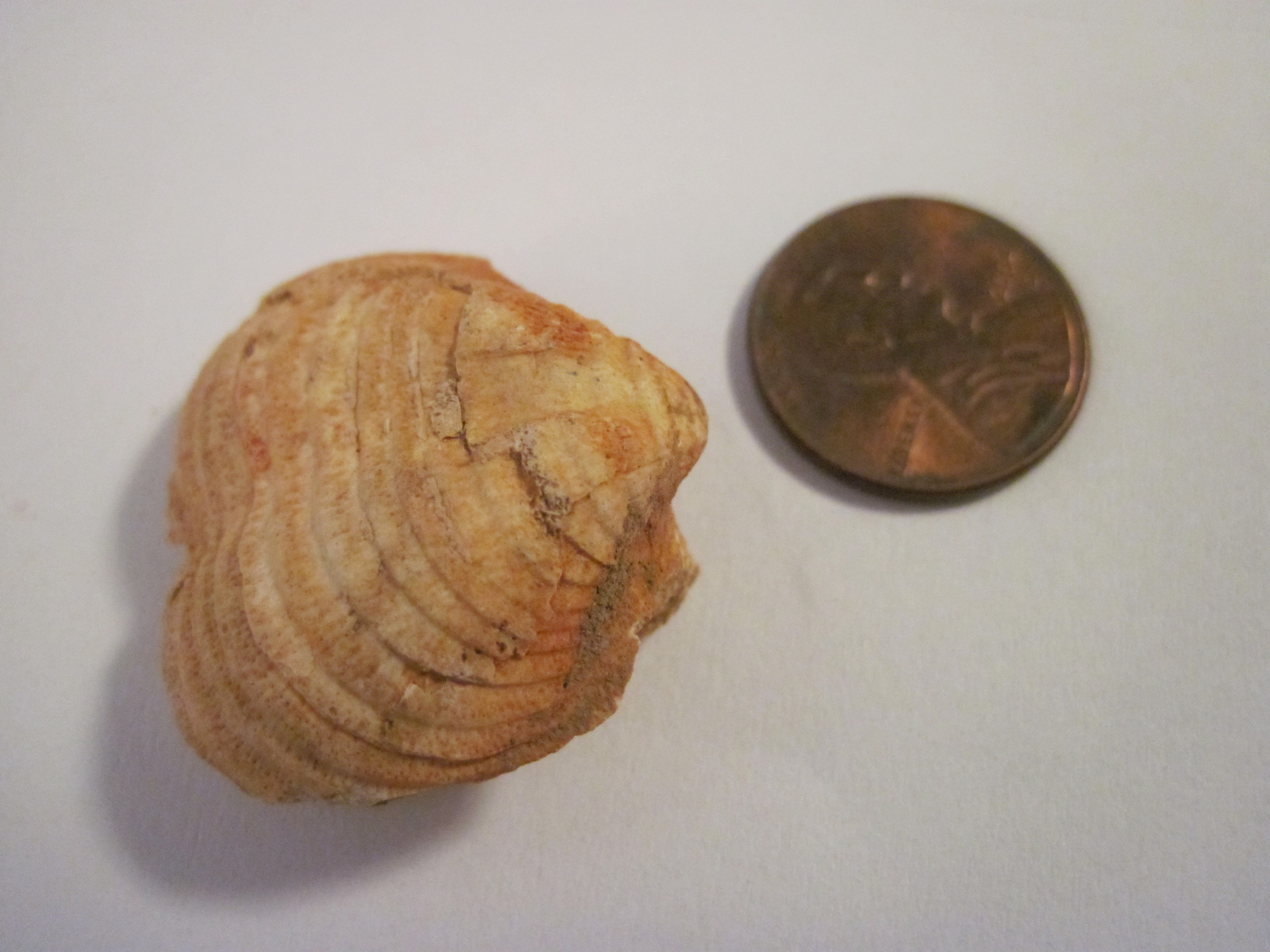
- Fossilized shell of the Late Devonian-Permian brachiopod Composita
  †Composita
  - †Composita elongata
  - †Composita ovata
  - †Composita subtilita
- †Condranema
  - †Condranema magna
  - †Condranema parvula
- †Condrathyris
  - †Condrathyris perplexa
- †Converrucosisporites
- †Convolutispora
  - †Convolutispora venusta
- †Cooleyella
  - †Cooleyella quinqueloba – type locality for species
  - †Cooleyella simplex – type locality for species
- †Cooperella
  - †Cooperella striata – type locality for species
- †Cordaianthus
  - †Cordaianthus pitcairniae – or unidentified comparable form
- †Cordaicarpus
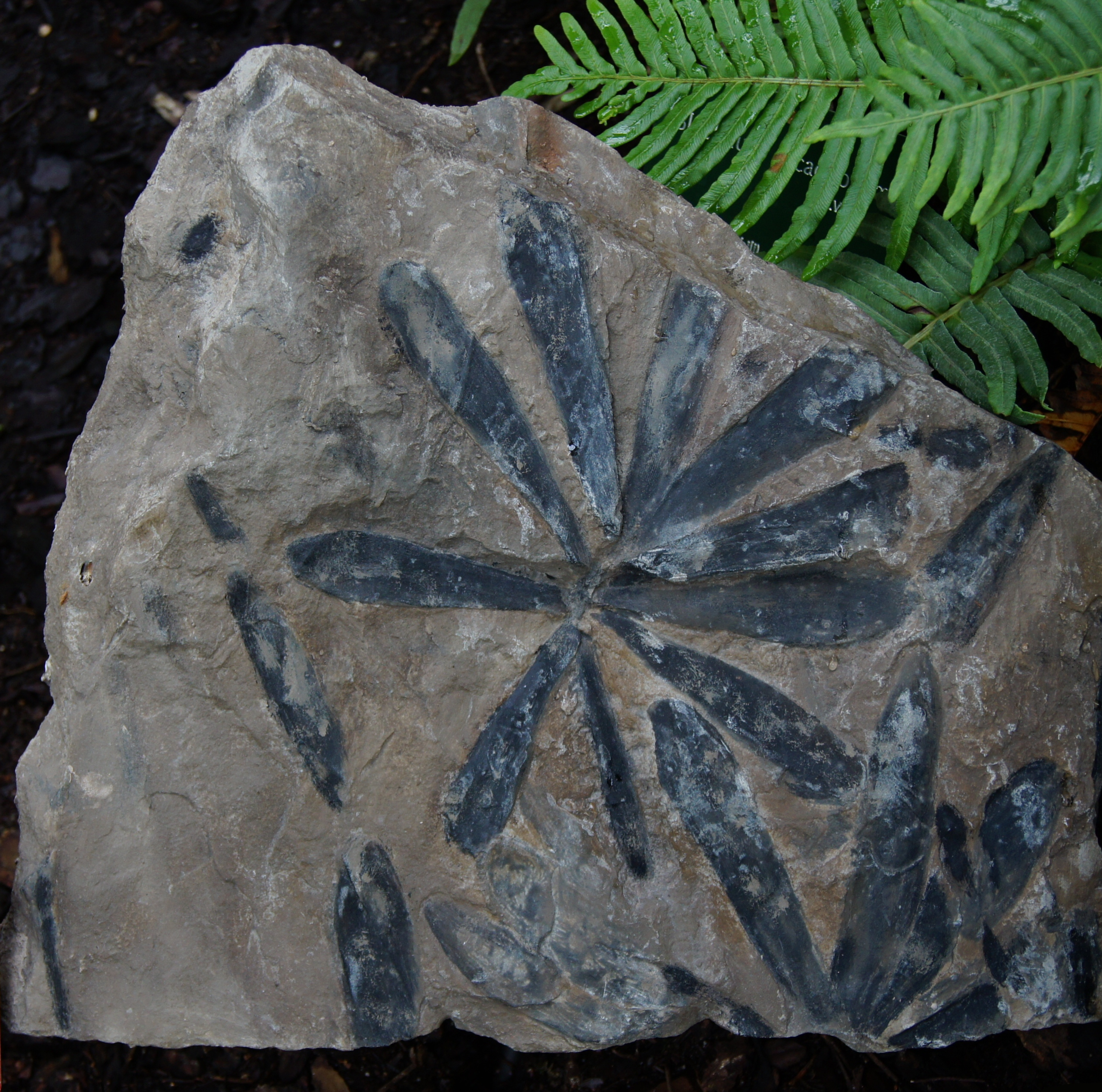
- Fossilized foliage of the Carboniferous-Permian conifer relative Cordaites
  †Cordaites
  - †Cordaites principalis
- †Cordaitina
- †Cornigella
  - †Cornigella binoda – type locality for species
  - †Cornigella parva – type locality for species
- †Corniops – type locality for genus
  - †Corniops mapesii – type locality for species
- †Coryellina
  - †Coryellina firma – type locality for species
- †Crassispora
  - †Crassispora kosankei
- †Crinoedischia – type locality for genus
  - †Crinoedischia buttsi – type locality for species
- †Cristatisporites
- †Crurithyris
  - †Crurithyris expansa
  - †Crurithyris planoconvexa
  - †Crurithyris subtilita
- †Cryptoscorpius – type locality for genus
  - †Cryptoscorpius americanus – type locality for species
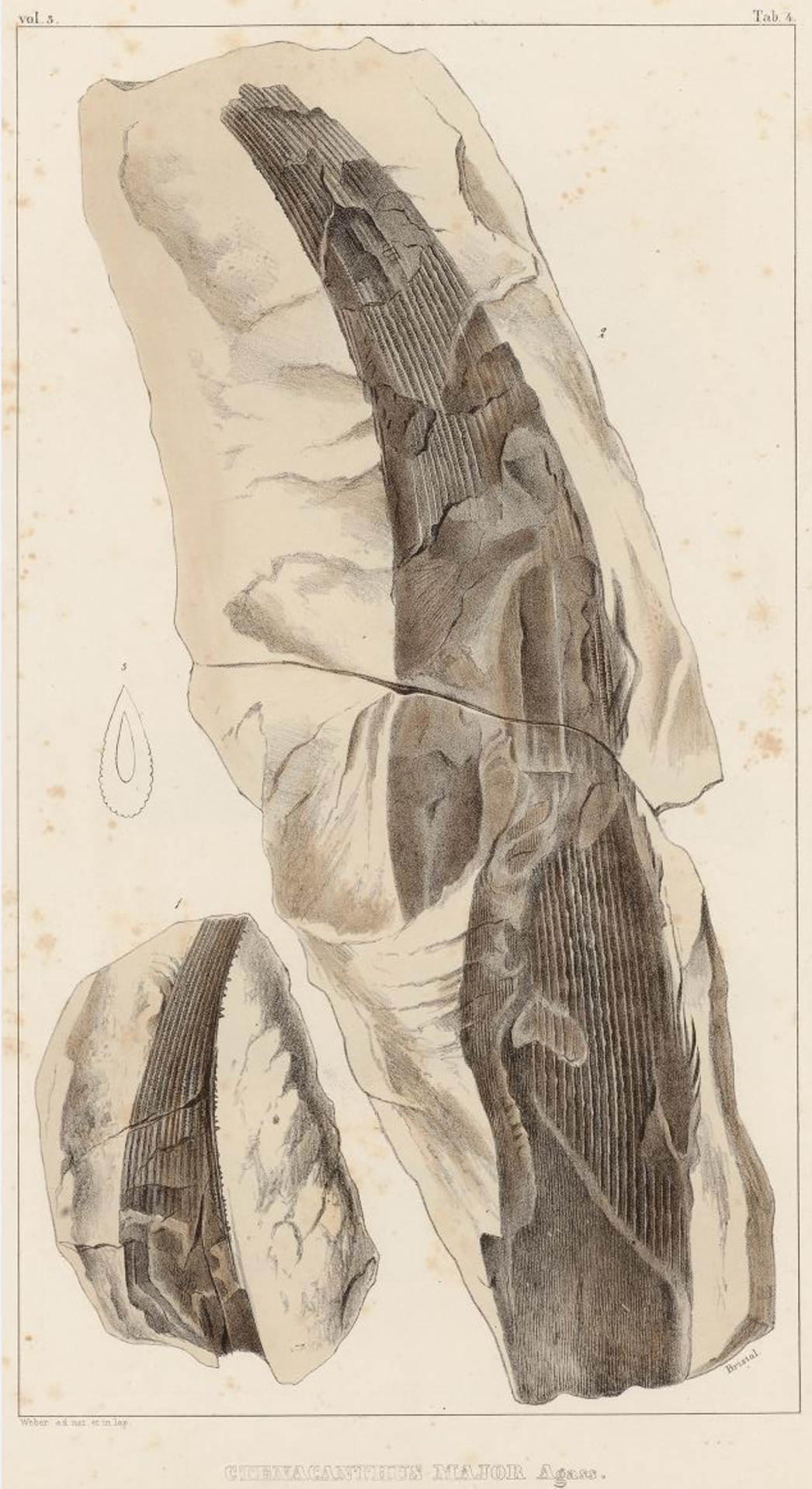
- Fossil of the Carboniferous shark Ctenacanthus
  †Ctenacanthus
  - †Ctenacanthus amblyxiphias
- †Cyathus
  - †Cyathus ulrichi
- †Cycadospadix
- †Cyclogranisporites
  - †Cyclogranisporites aureus
  - †Cyclogranisporites microgranus
  - †Cyclogranisporites minutus
  - †Cyclogranisporites obliquus
  - †Cyclogranisporites orbicularis
  - †Cyclogranisporites staplinii
- †Cyclopteris
- †Cyclotrypa
  - †Cyclotrypa pelagia
- †Cymatospira
  - †Cymatospira montfortianus
- †Cyphoneura – type locality for genus
  - †Cyphoneura permiana – type locality for species
- †Cyphoneurodes
  - †Cyphoneurodes reducta – type locality for species
- †Cypridellina
  - †Cypridellina newelli – type locality for species
- †Cystodictya –

== D ==
- †Dasyleptus – type locality for genus
  - †Dasyleptus artinskianus – type locality for species
  - †Dasyleptus sharovi – type locality for species
- †Delocrinus
  - †Delocrinus admirensis
  - †Delocrinus vulgatus
- †Delopsocus
  - †Delopsocus elongatus – type locality for species
  - †Delopsocus fasciatus – type locality for species
  - †Delopsocus kansanum – type locality for species
- †Delopterum – type locality for genus
  - †Delopterum latum – type locality for species
  - †Delopterum minutum – type locality for species
- †Deltodus
  - †Deltodus angularis – or unidentified comparable form
- †Deltoidospora
  - †Deltoidospora adnata
  - †Deltoidospora gracilis
  - †Deltoidospora grandis
  - †Deltoidospora levis
  - †Deltoidospora priddyi
  - †Deltoidospora pseudolevis
  - †Deltoidospora smithii
  - †Deltoidospora sphaerotriangula
  - †Deltoidospora subadnatoides
  - †Deltoidospora subintorta
- †Demopterum
  - †Demopterum gracile
- †Dendroidichnites
  - †Dendroidichnites irregulare
- †Densosporites
  - †Densosporites sphaerotriangularis
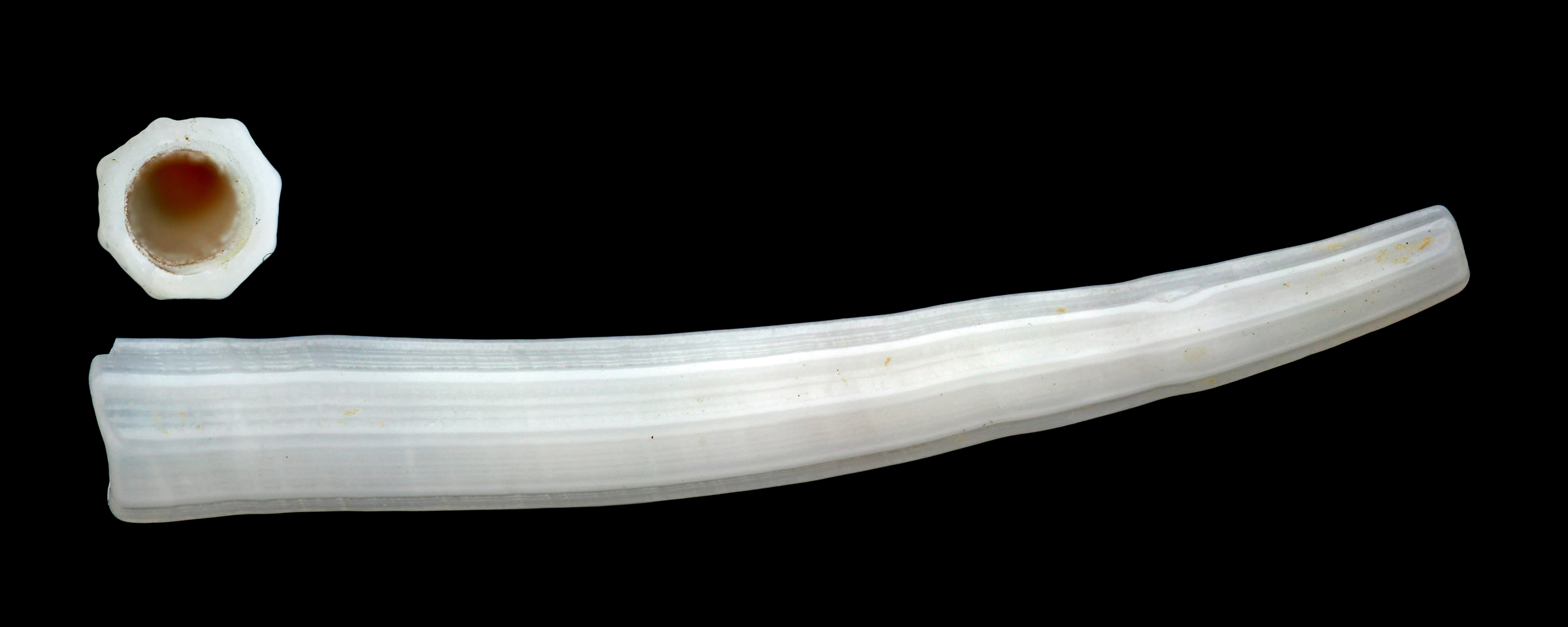
- Shell of a Dentalium tusk shell
  †Dentalium
  - †Dentalium kansasense
- †Derbyia
  - †Derbyia crassa
  - †Derbyia cymbula
  - †Derbyia cymula
  - †Derbyia hooserensis
  - †Derbyia wabaunseensis
- †Desmiodus
- †Desmoinesia
  - †Desmoinesia muricatina
  - †Desmoinesia nana
- †Desmoinsea
- †Dibuniphyllum
- †Dibunophyllum
- †Dichentomum – type locality for genus
  - †Dichentomum complexum – type locality for species
  - †Dichentomum grande – type locality for species
  - †Dichentomum latum – type locality for species
  - †Dichentomum minimum – type locality for species
  - †Dichentomum parvulum – type locality for species
  - †Dichentomum tinctum – type locality for species
- †Dichophyllum
  - †Dichophyllum moorei
- †Dicksonites
  - †Dicksonites pluckenetii
- †Dictyoclostus
- †Dictyomylacris – type locality for genus
  - †Dictyomylacris multinervis – type locality for species
- †Dielasma
  - †Dielasma bovidens
- †Dinoblatta
  - †Dinoblatta scudderi – type locality for species
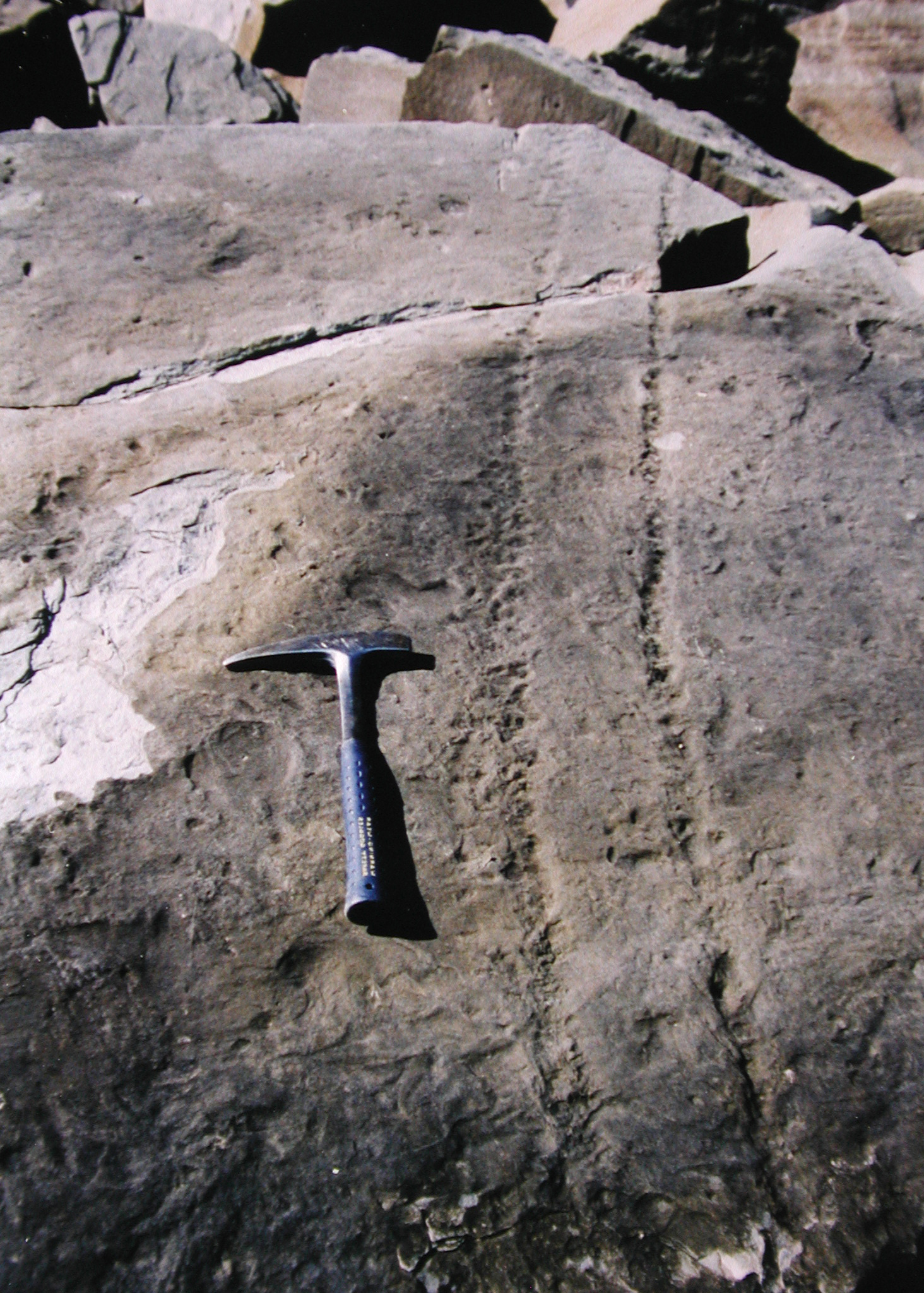
- Fossils of the Cambrian-modern arthropod trackway ichnogenus Diplichnites
  †Diplichnites
  - †Diplichnites gouldi
- †Diplopodichnus
  - †Diplopodichnus biformis
- †Ditaxineura – type locality for genus
  - †Ditaxineura anomalostigma – type locality for species
  - †Ditaxineura cellulosa
- †Ditomopyge – tentative report
  - †Ditomopyge decurtata
  - †Ditomopyge scitulus – tentative report
- †Donaldina
- †Doter – type locality for genus
  - †Doter minor – type locality for species
- †Ductilodon – type locality for genus
  - †Ductilodon pruitti – type locality for species
- †Dunbarella
  - †Dunbarella striata
- †Dunbaria – type locality for genus
  - †Dunbaria fasciipennis – type locality for species

== E ==
- †Echinaria
  - †Echinaria moorei
- †Echinoconchus
  - †Echinoconchus semipunctatus
- †Economolopsis
  - †Economolopsis anodontoides – tentative report
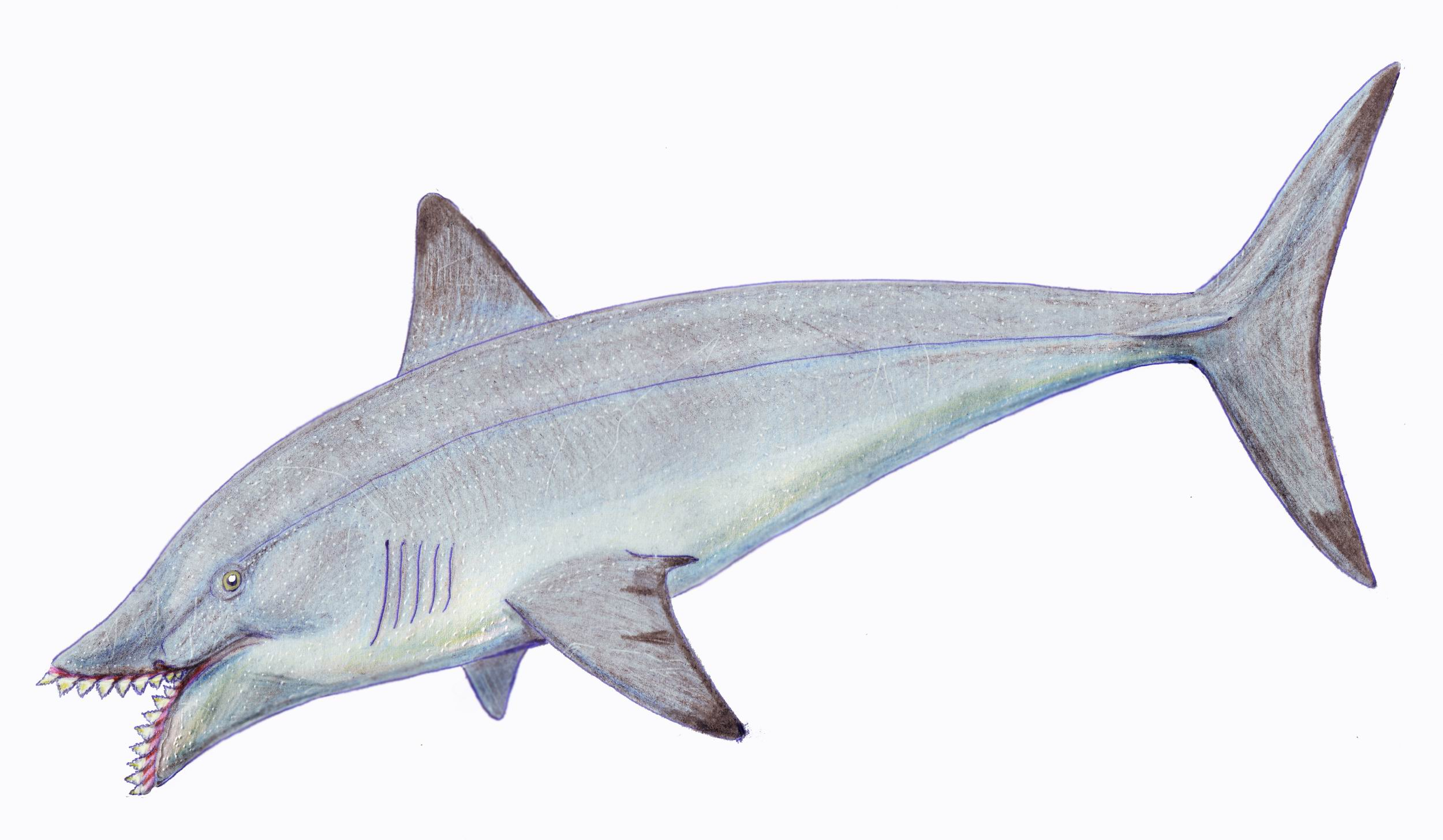
- Life restoration of the Late Devonian-Carboniferous Chimaera relative Edestus
  †Edestus
  - †Edestus heinrichi – or unidentified comparable form
- †Edmondia
  - †Edmondia nebrascensis
- †Elibatocrinus
- †Ellipsella
  - †Ellipsella distenta – type locality for species
- †Elmoa – type locality for genus
  - †Elmoa trisecta – type locality for species
- †Elmoboria – type locality for genus
  - †Elmoboria piperi – type locality for species
- †Elmopterum – type locality for genus
  - †Elmopterum rotundum – type locality for species
- †Elmothone – type locality for genus
  - †Elmothone martynovae – type locality for species
- †Elytroneura
  - †Elytroneura permiana
- †Emilites
  - †Emilites incertus
- †Endelocrinus
  - †Endelocrinus rotundus
- †Endosporites
  - †Endosporites globiformis
  - †Endosporites plicatus
- †Endothyra
- †Enteletes
  - †Enteletes hemiplicata
- †Eoasianites
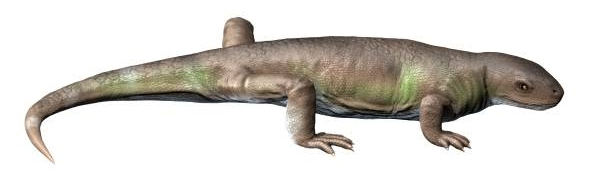
- Life restoration of the Carboniferous synapsid (mammal precursor) Eocasea
  †Eocasea – type locality for genus
  - †Eocasea martini – type locality for species
- †Eohaptodus
  - †Eohaptodus garnettensis – type locality for species
- †Eolissochonetes
- †Eoryodus
- †Eoscopus – type locality for genus
  - †Eoscopus lockardi – type locality for species
- †Erisocrinus
- †Etoblattina
  - †Etoblattina coriacea – type locality for species
  - †Etoblattina fulva – type locality for species
  - †Etoblattina obscura – type locality for species
- †Euchondria
  - †Euchondria pellucida – tentative report
- †Euchoroptera – type locality for genus
  - †Euchoroptera longipennis – type locality for species
- †Euconcordia – type locality for genus
  - †Euconcordia cunninghami – type locality for species
- †Euconospira
- †Euonychocrinus
- †Euphemites
  - †Euphemites carbonarius
  - †Euphemites graffhami – type locality for species
  - †Euphemites regulatus – type locality for species
- †Euprioniodina
- †Exocrinus
- †Exoriocrinus –

== F ==
- †Fabalicypris
  - †Fabalicypris acetalata
  - †Fabalicypris glennensis
  - †Fabalicypris hoxbarensis
- †Fenestella
  - †Fenestella artior
  - †Fenestella cruciformis
  - †Fenestella gaptankensis
  - †Fenestella mimica
- †Fenestrellina
- †Filiramoporina – type locality for genus
  - †Filiramoporina kretaphilia – type locality for species
- †Fimbrinia
- †Fissodus
  - †Fissodus dentatus – type locality for species
- †Fistulipora
  - †Fistulipora carbonaria
  - †Fistulipora incrustans
- †Florinites
  - †Florinites mediapudens
  - †Florinites millotti
  - †Florinites similis
  - †Florinites triletus
  - †Florinites visendus
  - †Florinites volans
- †Foveosporites
  - †Foveosporites insculptus

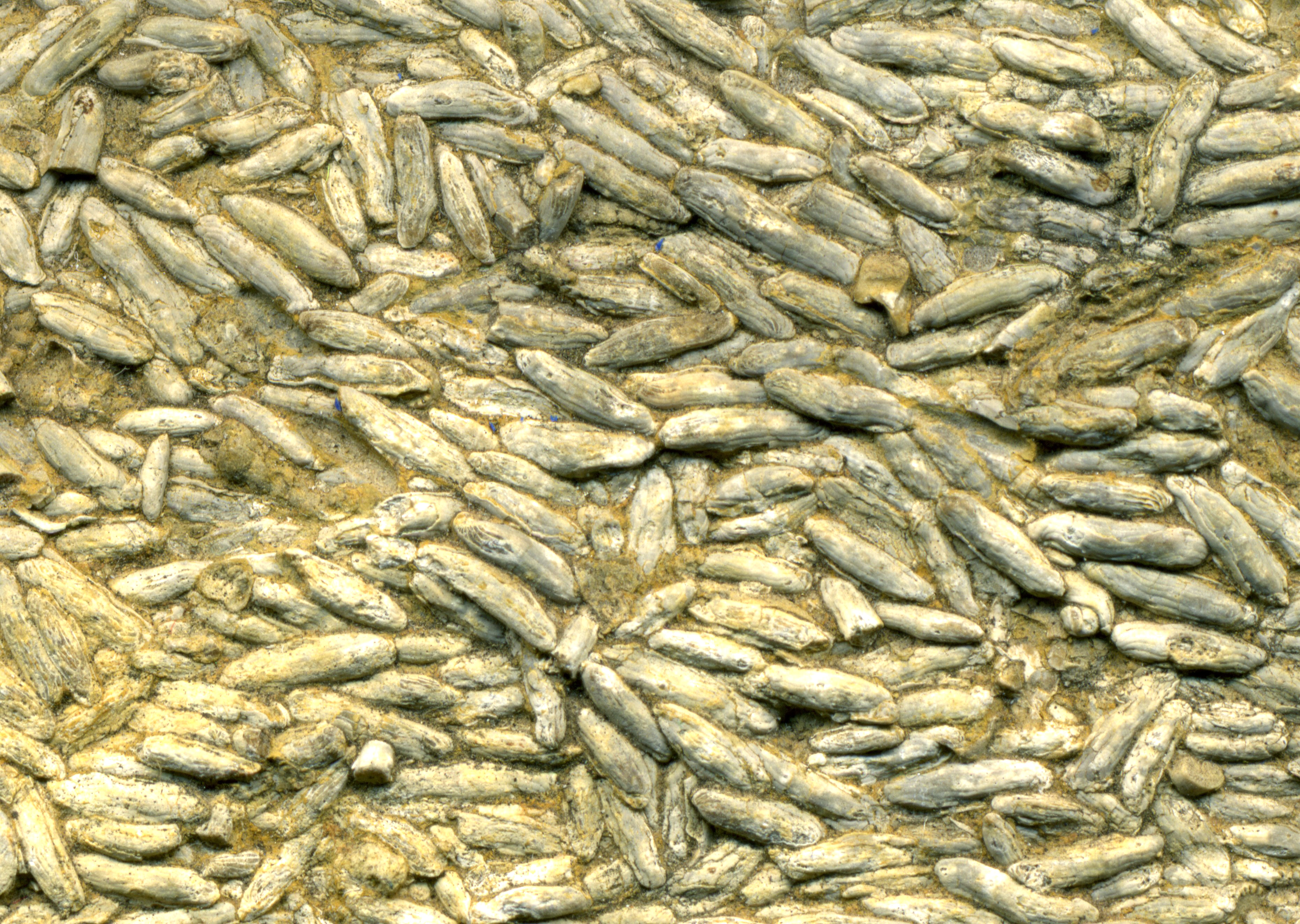
Assemblage of fossils of Silurian-Permian fusulinid foraminiferans

†Fusulina

  - †Fusulina cylindrica

== G ==
- †Galateacrinus
- †Garnettius
  - †Garnettius hungerfordi – type locality for species
- †Geinitzina
- †Gelasopteron – type locality for genus
  - †Gelasopteron gracile – type locality for species
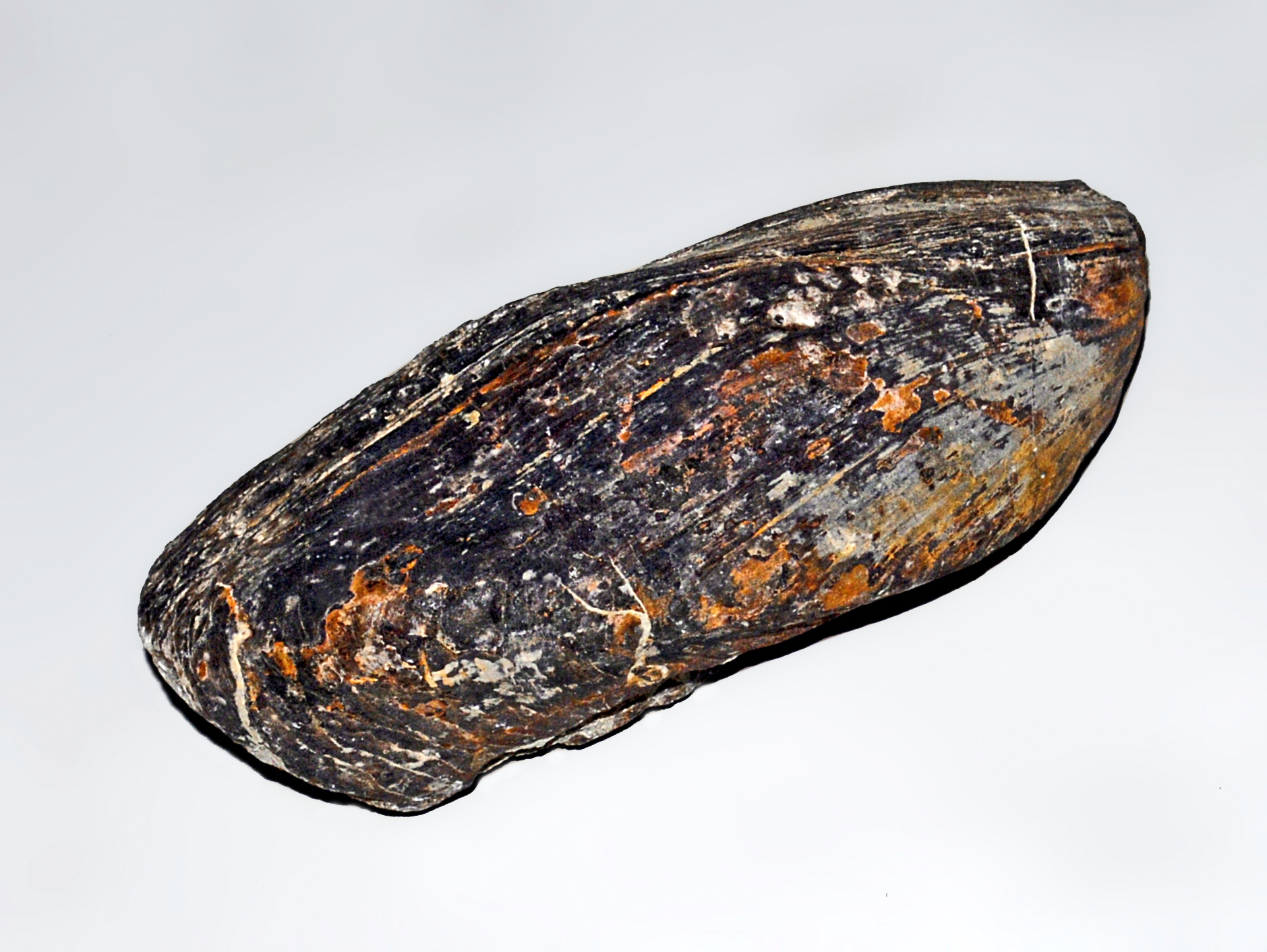
- Fossilized shell of the Carboniferous-Eocene bivalve Gervillia
  †Gervillia
  - †Gervillia longa – or unidentified comparable form
- †Girtycoelia
- †Glabrocingulum
  - †Glabrocingulum grayvillense
- †Glaphyrites
  - †Glaphyrites welleri
- †Glaphyrophlebia – type locality for genus
  - †Glaphyrophlebia ovata – type locality for species
  - †Glaphyrophlebia speciosa – type locality for species
- †Glaukosocrinus
- †Glenopteris
  - †Glenopteris lineata
  - †Glenopteris lobata
  - †Glenopteris splendens
  - †Glenopteris sterlingi
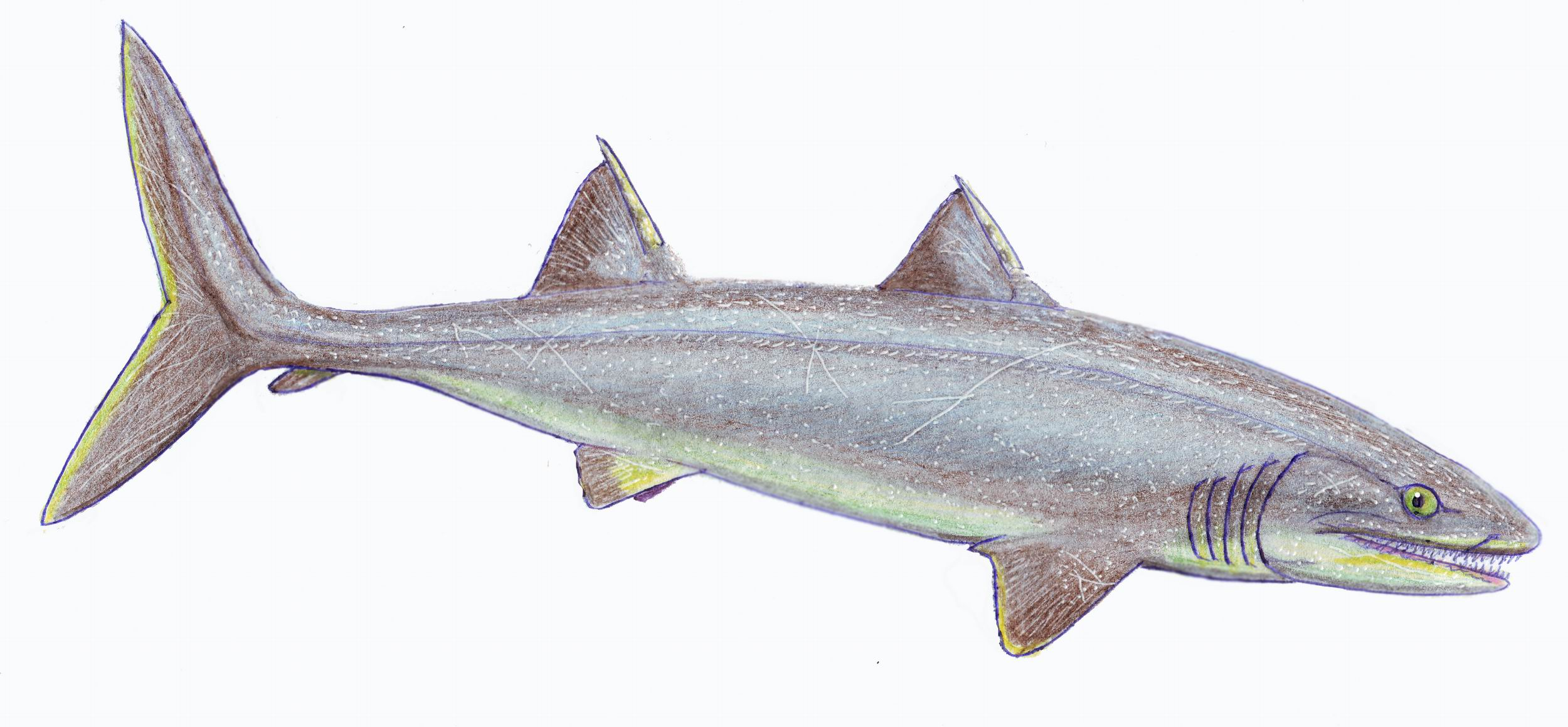
- Life restoration of the Carboniferous shark Glikmanius
  †Glikmanius
  - †Glikmanius occidentalis
- †Globovalvulina
- †Glyptopleura
  - †Glyptopleura triserta
- †Gomphostrobus
- †Goniasma
  - †Goniasma lasallense
- †Gonioglyphioceras
- †Gonioloboceras
  - †Gonioloboceras goniolobus
- †Gordia
  - †Gordia indianaensis
- †Graffhamicrinus
  - †Graffhamicrinus magnificus
  - †Graffhamicrinus profundus – type locality for species
  - †Graffhamicrinus waughi – or unidentified comparable form
- †Granasporites
  - †Granasporites medius
- †Granulatisporites
  - †Granulatisporites adnatoides
  - †Granulatisporites granularis
  - †Granulatisporites granulatus
  - †Granulatisporites livingstonensis
  - †Granulatisporites microgranifer
  - †Granulatisporites minutus
  - †Granulatisporites pallidus
  - †Granulatisporites pannosites
  - †Granulatisporites parvus
  - †Granulatisporites verrucosus
- †Graphiocrinus
  - †Graphiocrinus kansasensis
- †Gunnellodus
  - †Gunnellodus bellistriatus – type locality for species

== H ==
- †Haenoblattina – type locality for genus
  - †Haenoblattina rarinervis – type locality for species
  - †Haenoblattina tenuis – type locality for species
- †Hamiapollenites
- †Hamiltonichthys – type locality for genus
  - †Hamiltonichthys mapesi – type locality for species
- †Hammondella – type locality for genus
  - †Hammondella crassa – type locality for species
  - †Hammondella globosa – type locality for species
- †Haworthina – type locality for genus
  - †Haworthina bulleta
- †Healdia
  - †Healdia compressa – type locality for species
  - †Healdia cuneata
  - †Healdia parallela – type locality for species
  - †Healdia simplex
  - †Healdia winfieldensis
- †Helminthoidichnites
  - †Helminthoidichnites tenius
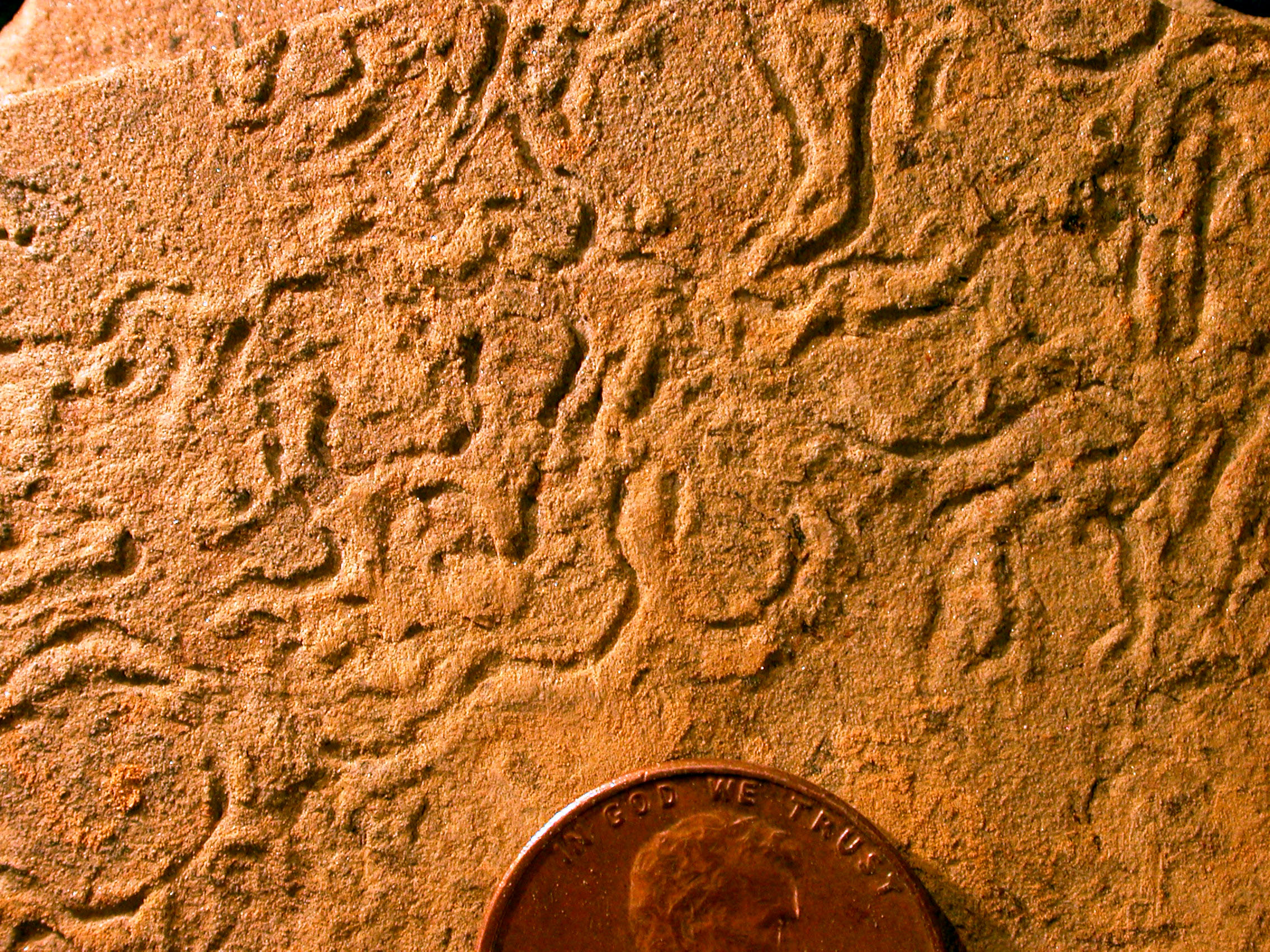
- Fossils of the burrow ichnogenus Helminthopsis
  †Helminthopsis
  - †Helminthopsis heiroglyphica
- †Heslerodus
  - †Heslerodus divergens
- †Hesperoherpeton – type locality for genus
  - †Hesperoherpeton garnettense – type locality for species
- †Heteroptilon – type locality for genus
  - †Heteroptilon costale – type locality for species
- †Hollinella
  - †Hollinella burlingamensis – type locality for species
  - †Hollinella cushmani – type locality for species
- †Holmesella
  - †Holmesella crassa – type locality for species
  - †Holmesella quadrata
- †Homocladus – type locality for genus
  - †Homocladus grandis – type locality for species
- †Hpyselentoma
  - †Hpyselentoma perhumerosa
- †Hustedia
  - †Hustedia mormoni
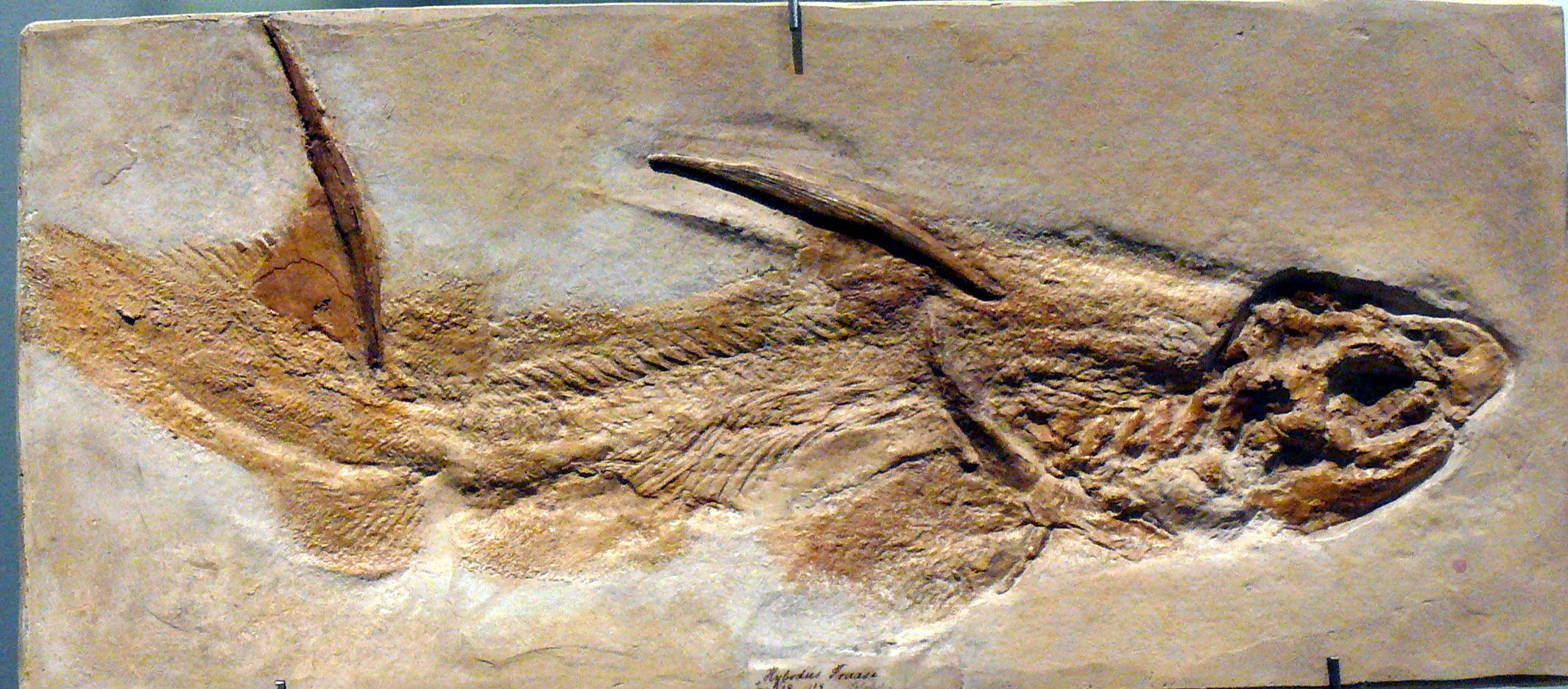
- Fossilized skeleton of the Permian-Late Cretaceous shark Hybodus
  †Hybodus
- †Hypermegethes
  - †Hypermegethes pilchi – type locality for species
- †Hystriculina
  - †Hystriculina hystricula
  - †Hystriculina wabashensis

== I ==
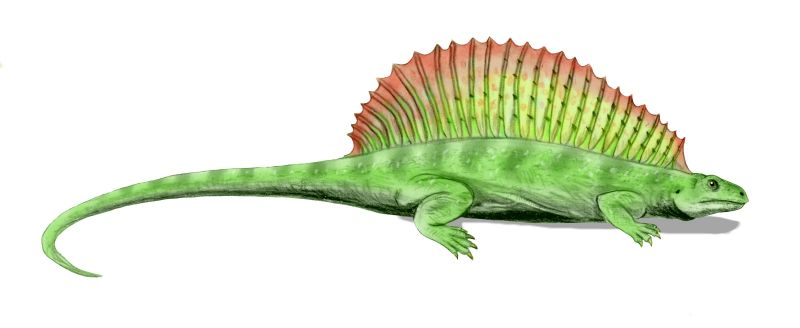
- Restoration of the Carboniferous synapsid (mammal precursor) Ianthasaurus
  †Ianthasaurus – type locality for genus
  - †Ianthasaurus hardestiorum – type locality for species
- †Ianthinopsis
- †Ianthodon – type locality for genus
  - †Ianthodon schultzei – type locality for species
- †Illinites
  - †Illinites unicus
- †Imitoceras
  - †Imitoceras grahamense
- †Isogramma
  - †Isogramma millepunctata –

== J ==
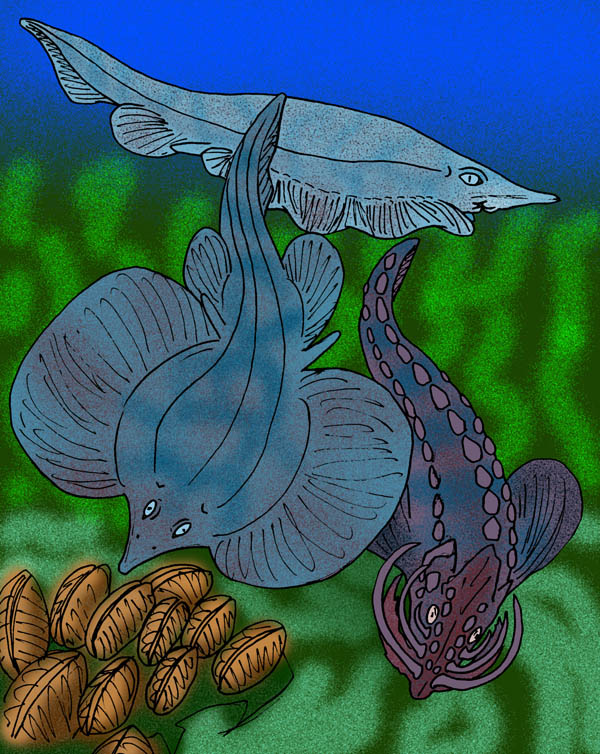
- Restoration of the Carboniferous-Permian ray-like cartilaginous fish Janassa (top and left)
  †Janassa
- †Jedria
  - †Jedria ventrica
- †Jonesina
  - †Jonesina howardensis – type locality for species
  - †Jonesina primitioides
- †Juresania
  - †Juresania nebrascensis2

== K ==
- †Kallimorphocrinus
- †Kansasia – type locality for genus
  - †Kansasia pulchra – type locality for species
- †Kansasoedischia
  - †Kansasoedischia maculata – type locality for species
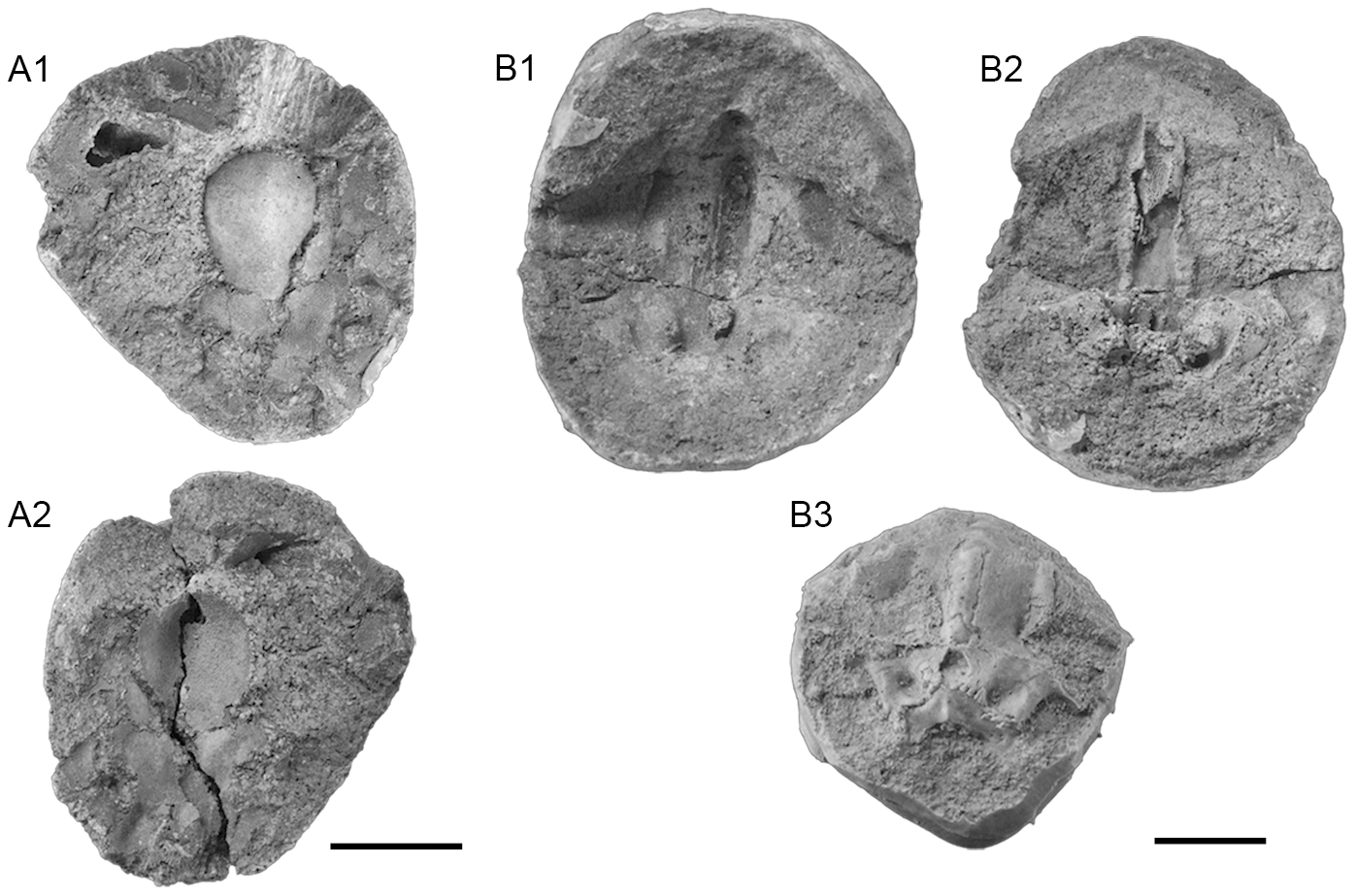
- Phosphate nodules containing fossils of the Carboniferous Chimaera relative Kawichthys
  †Kawichthys – type locality for genus
  - †Kawichthys moodiei – type locality for species
- †Kellettella
  - †Kellettella navicula
- †Kellettina
  - †Kellettina robusta – type locality for species
- †Kennedya – type locality for genus
  - †Kennedya mirabilis – type locality for species
  - †Kennedya reducta – type locality for species
  - †Kennedya tillyardi – type locality for species
- †Kenomagnathus – type locality for genus
  - †Kenomagnathus scotti – type locality for species
- †Kewaneesporites
  - †Kewaneesporites patulus
- †Kindlella
  - †Kindlella minuta
- †Kirkbya
  - †Kirkbya clarocarinata
  - †Kirkbya firma – type locality for species
  - †Kirkbya moorei – type locality for species
  - †Kirkbya pergrandis – type locality for species
  - †Kirkbya punctata – type locality for species
  - †Kirkbya valida – type locality for species
- †Kirkella
  - †Kirkella elliptica – type locality for species
- †Knightina
  - †Knightina ampla – type locality for species
  - †Knightina bassleri – type locality for species
  - †Knightina harltoni – type locality for species
  - †Knightina incurva – type locality for species
  - †Knightina texana
- †Knightinella
  - †Knightinella humerosa – type locality for species
- †Knightites – type locality for genus
  - †Knightites multicornutus – type locality for species
- †Knoxisporites
  - †Knoxisporites stephanephorus
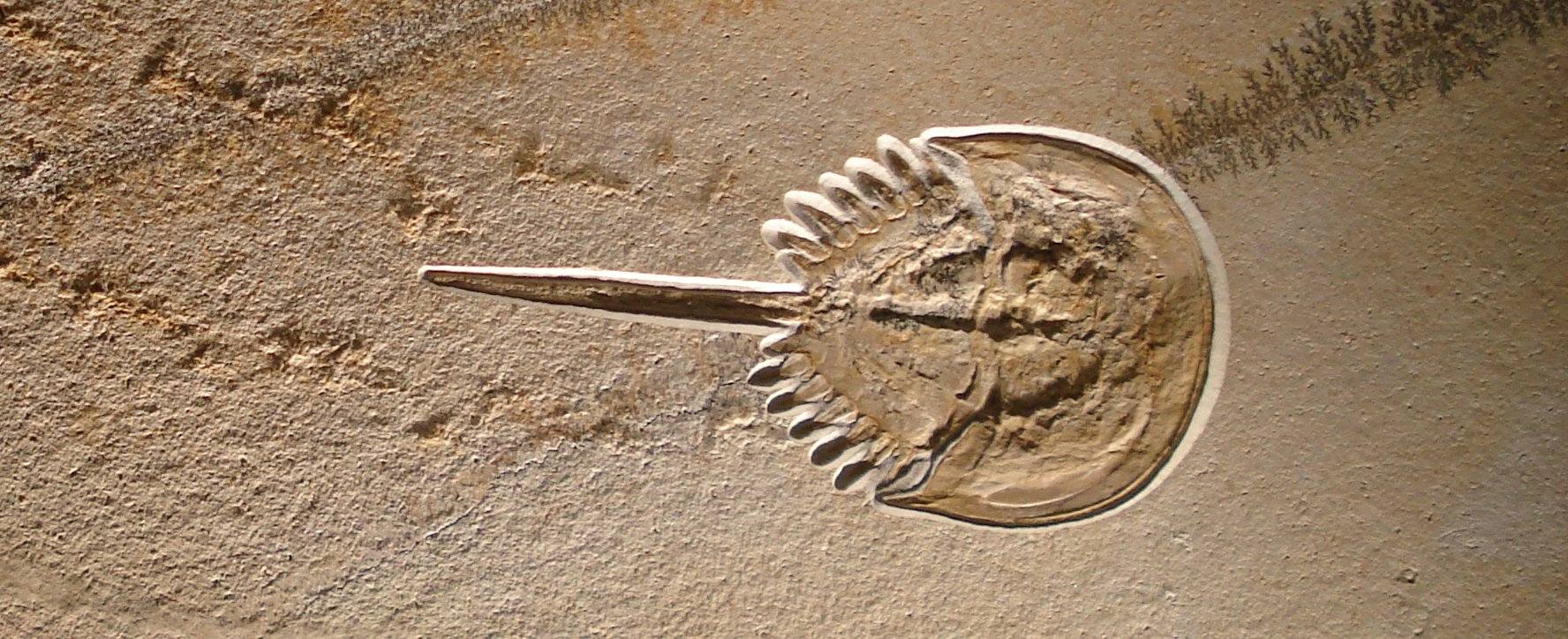
- Fossil of the Late Jurassic horseshoe crab Mesolimulus at the end of the trackway that it produced of the ichnogenus Kouphichnium
  †Kouphichnium
  - †Kouphichnium isp.
- †Kozlowskia
  - †Kozlowskia splendens
- †Kutorginella
  - †Kutorginella lasallensis – or unidentified comparable form

== L ==
- †Laevigatosporites
  - †Laevigatosporites desmoinesensis
  - †Laevigatosporites globosus
  - †Laevigatosporites medius
  - †Laevigatosporites moinesensis
  - †Laevigatosporites ovalis
  - †Laevigatosporites vulgaris
- †Lagarodus
  - †Lagarodus angustus
- †Latosporites
  - †Latosporites minutus
- †Lawrenciella – type locality for genus
  - †Lawrenciella schaefferi – type locality for species
- †Lebachia
  - †Lebachia garnettensis
  - †Lebachia lockardii
- †Lecopterum – type locality for genus
  - †Lecopterum delicosum – type locality for species
- †Lecorium – type locality for genus
  - †Lecorium elongatum – type locality for species
- †Lecythiocrinus
- †Lemmatophora – type locality for genus
  - †Lemmatophora typa – type locality for species
- †Lepetopsis
  - †Lepetopsis peregrina – type locality for species
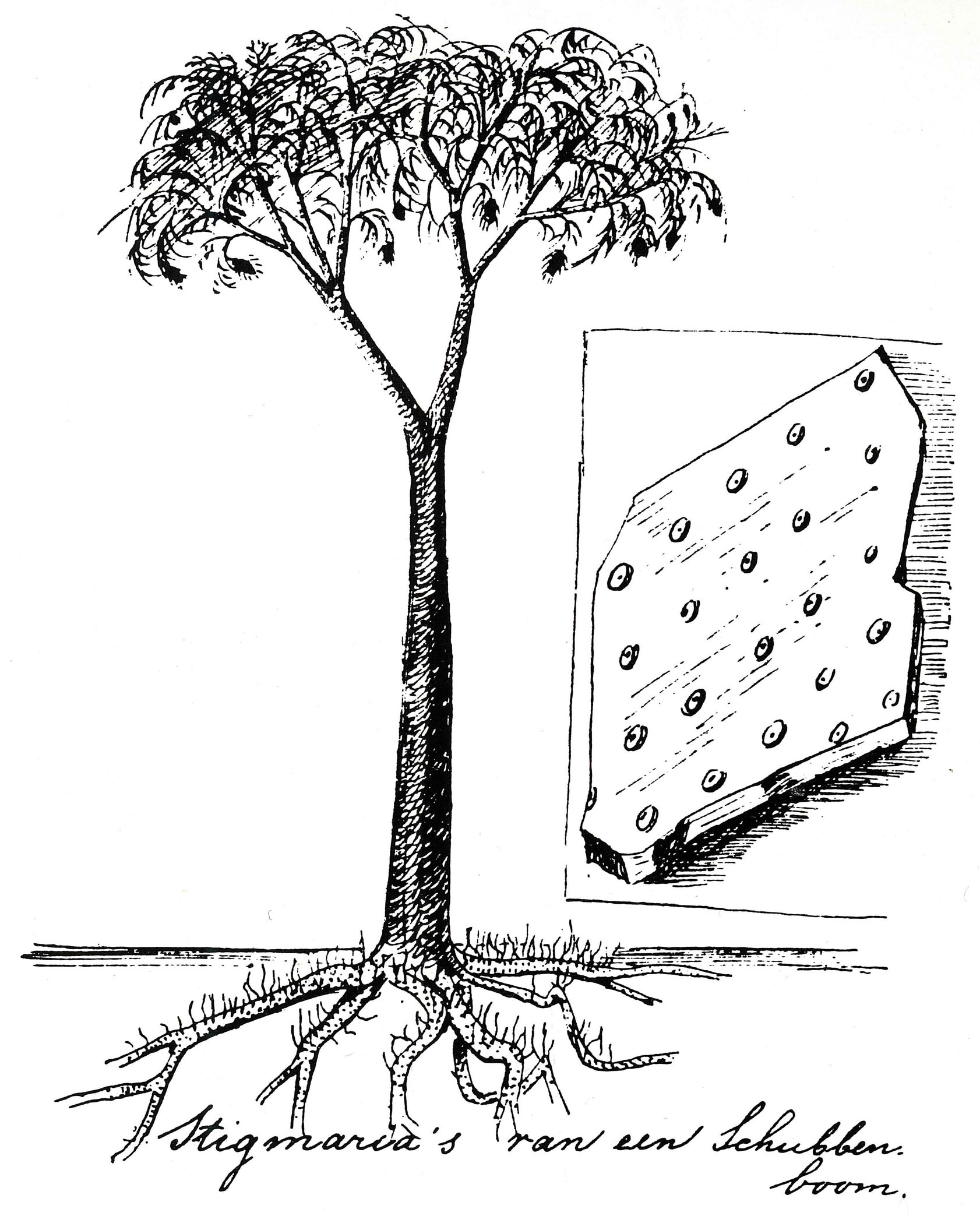
- Restoration of the Carboniferous-Late Triassic club moss relative Lepidodendron. Eli Heimans (1911).
  †Lepidodendron
- †Leptalosia
  - †Leptalosia ovalis
- †Limitisporites
- †Limitsporites
- †Lindstroemella – tentative report
- †Lingula
  - †Lingula carbonaria
  - †Lingula osagensis
- †Linipalus
  - †Linipalus magnispinus
- †Linoproductus
  - †Linoproductus insinuatus
  - †Linoproductus magnispina
  - †Linoproductus prattenianus
- †Linopteris
  - †Linopteris neuropteroides – or unidentified comparable form
- †Liomopterum – type locality for genus
  - †Liomopterum elongatum – type locality for species
  - †Liomopterum ornatum – type locality for species
  - †Liomopterum sellardsi – type locality for species
- †Lisca – type locality for genus
  - †Lisca minuta – type locality for species
- †Lissochonetes
  - †Lissochonetes geinitzianus
  - †Lissochonetes geroniticus
  - †Lissochonetes geronticus
- †Lissodus
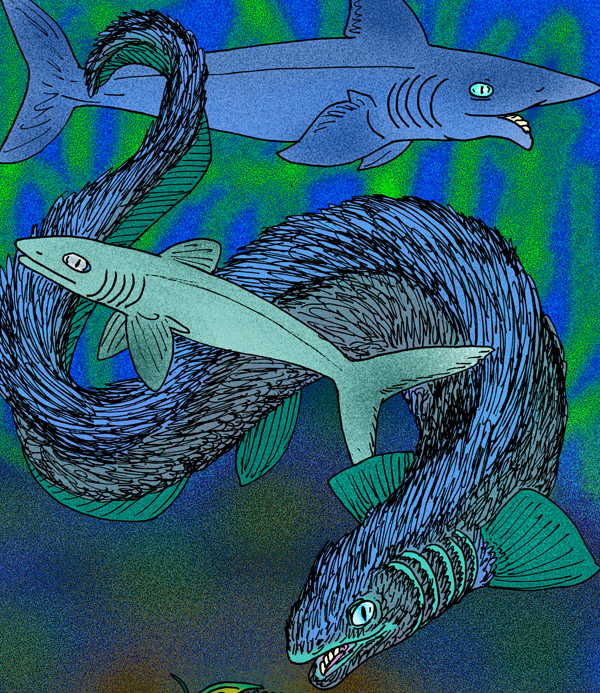
- Restoration of the Carboniferous-Early Triassic cartilaginous fish Listracanthus
  †Listracanthus
  - †Listracanthus hystrix
- †Lithopanorpa
  - †Lithopanorpa pusilla – type locality for species
- Lithophaga
- †Lithopsocidium – type locality for genus
  - †Lithopsocidium permianum – type locality for species
- †Lithoscytina – type locality for genus
  - †Lithoscytina cubitalis – type locality for species
- †Lophamplexus
  - †Lophamplexus brevifolius
  - †Lophamplexus phractus – type locality for species
  - †Lophamplexus ulius – type locality for species
  - †Lophamplexus vagus
  - †Lophamplexus westii
- †Lophophyllidium
  - †Lophophyllidium absitum – type locality for species
  - †Lophophyllidium compressum
  - †Lophophyllidium distortum – type locality for species
  - †Lophophyllidium hadrum
  - †Lophophyllidium profundum
  - †Lophophyllidium wewokanum
- †Lophophyllum
- †Lophotriletes
  - †Lophotriletes commissuralis
  - †Lophotriletes copiosus
  - †Lophotriletes gibbosus
  - †Lophotriletes ibrahimii
  - †Lophotriletes microsaetosus
  - †Lophotriletes mosaicus
  - †Lophotriletes pseudaculeatus
  - †Lophotriletes rarispinosus
- †Lycodus – type locality for genus
  - †Lycodus garretti – type locality for species
- †Lycospora
  - †Lycospora brevijuga
  - †Lycospora granulata
  - †Lycospora micropapillata
  - †Lycospora ovalis
  - †Lycospora pellucida
  - †Lycospora pusilla
  - †Lycospora rotunda
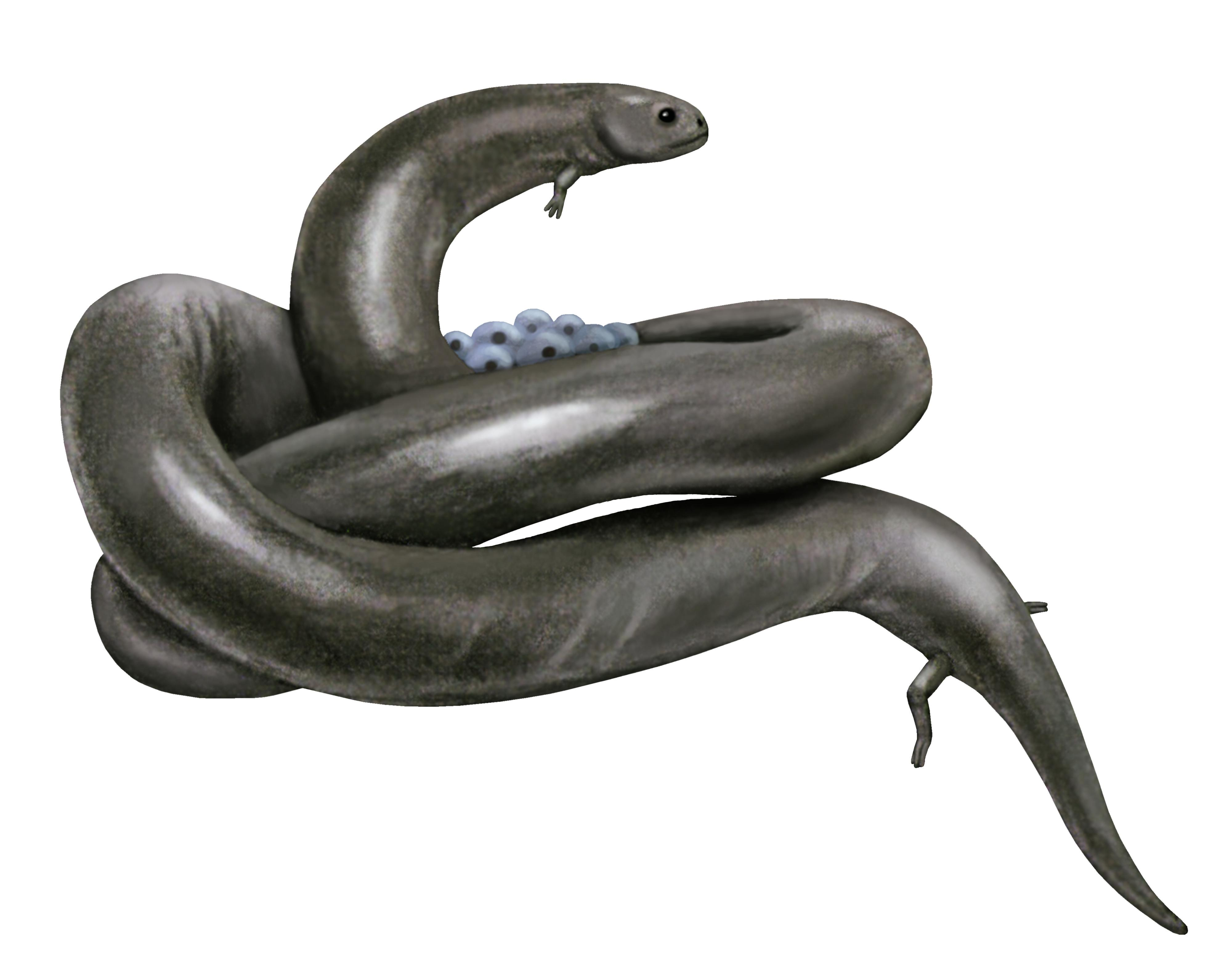
- Life restoration of the Permian snake-like amphibian Lysorophus showing speculative egg-coiling behavior
  †Lysorophus –

== M ==
- Macrocypris
  - †Macrocypris garrisonensis
  - †Macrocypris menardensis
- †Mapesites – type locality for genus
  - †Mapesites chautauquaensis – type locality for species
- †Marginifer
  - †Marginifer wabashensis
- †Marginifera
  - †Marginifera wabashenis
- †Mariopteris
- †Marmolatella
  - †Marmolatella subovata
- †Martynovia – type locality for genus
  - †Martynovia insignis – type locality for species
  - †Martynovia protohymenoides – type locality for species
- †Meekechinus – type locality for genus
  - †Meekechinus elegans – type locality for species
- †Meekella
  - †Meekella striaticostata
  - †Meekella striatocostata
- †Meekopora
  - †Meekopora prosseri
- †Meekoporella
  - †Meekoporella dehiscens
- †Meekospira
- †Megactenopetalus
  - †Megactenopetalus kaibabanus
- †Meganeuropsis – type locality for genus
  - †Meganeuropsis permiana – type locality for species
- †Megatypus – type locality for genus
  - †Megatypus ingentissimus – type locality for species
  - †Megatypus parvus – type locality for species
  - †Megatypus schucherti – type locality for species
  - †Megatypus vetustus – type locality for species
- †Megelytron – type locality for genus
  - †Megelytron robustum – type locality for species
- †Mesolobus
- †Mesoptilus
  - †Mesoptilus carpenteri – type locality for species
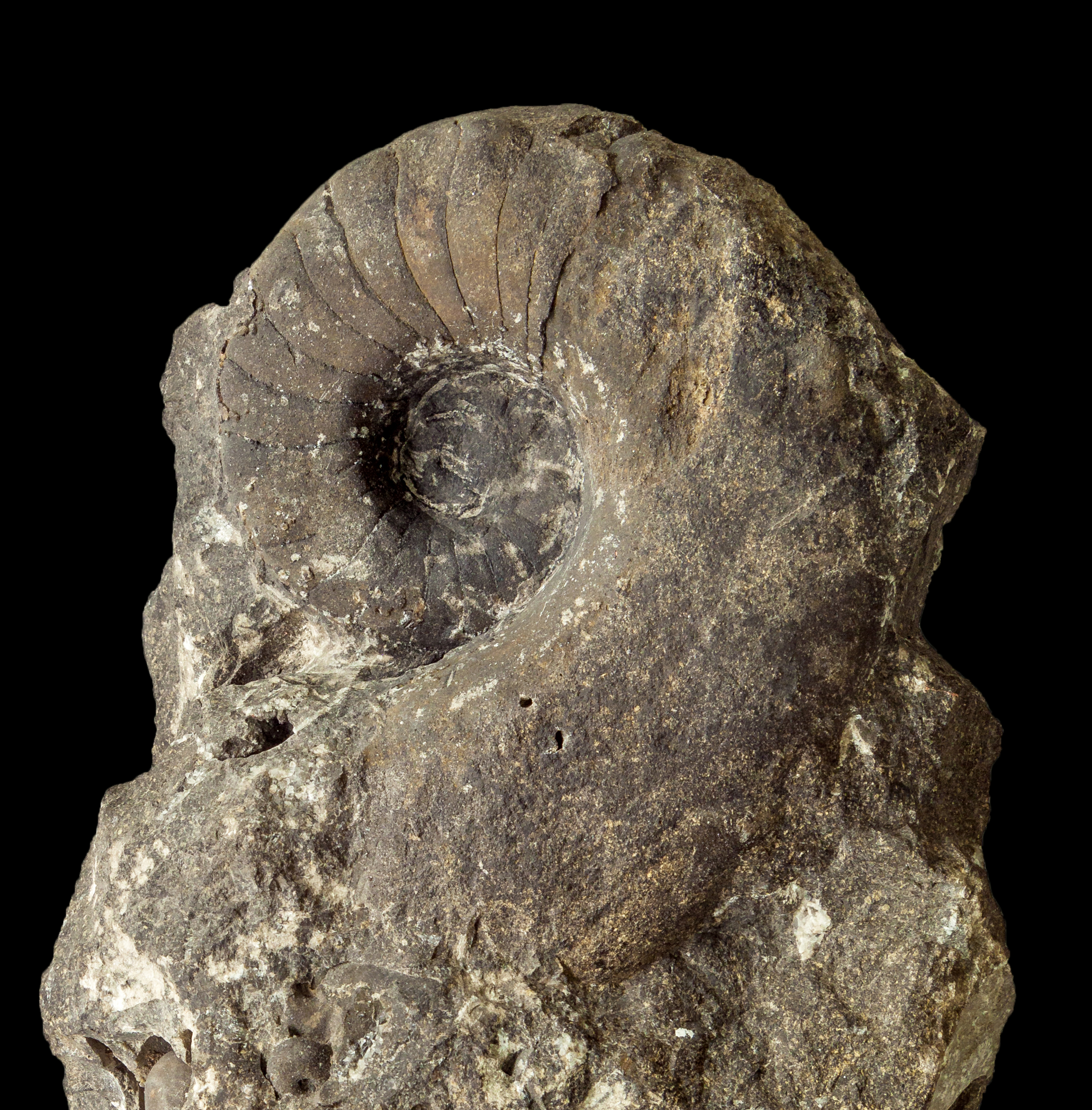
- Fossilized shell of the Carboniferous-Permian nautiloid cephalopod Metacoceras
  †Metacoceras
- †Michelinia – tentative report
- †Microantyx
  - †Microantyx permiana – type locality for species
- †Microcheilinella
  - †Microcheilinella inflata – type locality for species
- †Microreticulatisporites
  - †Microreticulatisporites concavus
  - †Microreticulatisporites harrisonii
  - †Microreticulatisporites nobilis
  - †Microreticulatisporites noblis
  - †Microreticulatisporites sulcatus
- †Millerella
  - †Millerella inflata
- †Minilya
  - †Minilya binodata
- †Mirandaichnium
  - †Mirandaichnium famatinense
- †Misthodotes – type locality for genus
  - †Misthodotes biguttatus – type locality for species
  - †Misthodotes delicatulus – type locality for species
  - †Misthodotes obtusus – type locality for species
  - †Misthodotes ovalis – type locality for species
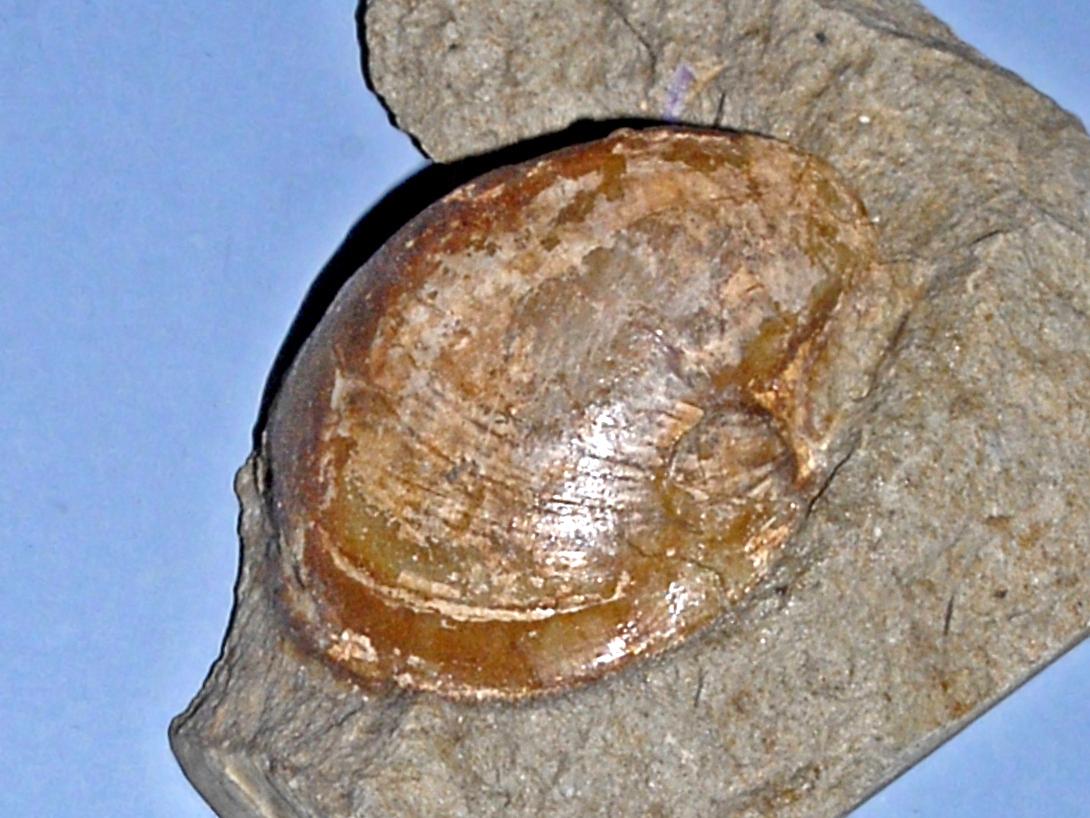
- Fossilized shell of the Devonian-modern marine bivalve Modiolus, or horsemussel
  †Modiolus
- †Monoceratina
  - †Monoceratina lewisi
- †Monopteria
  - †Monopteria gibbosa
- †Mooreisporites
  - †Mooreisporites inusitatus
- †Mooreoceras
- †Moorites
  - †Moorites minutus
- †Muensteroceras
- †Multithecopora
- †Murospora
  - †Murospora kosankei
- †Myalina
  - †Myalina meeki – type locality for species
  - †Myalina swallowi
- †Mylacris
  - †Mylacris latissima – type locality for species

== N ==
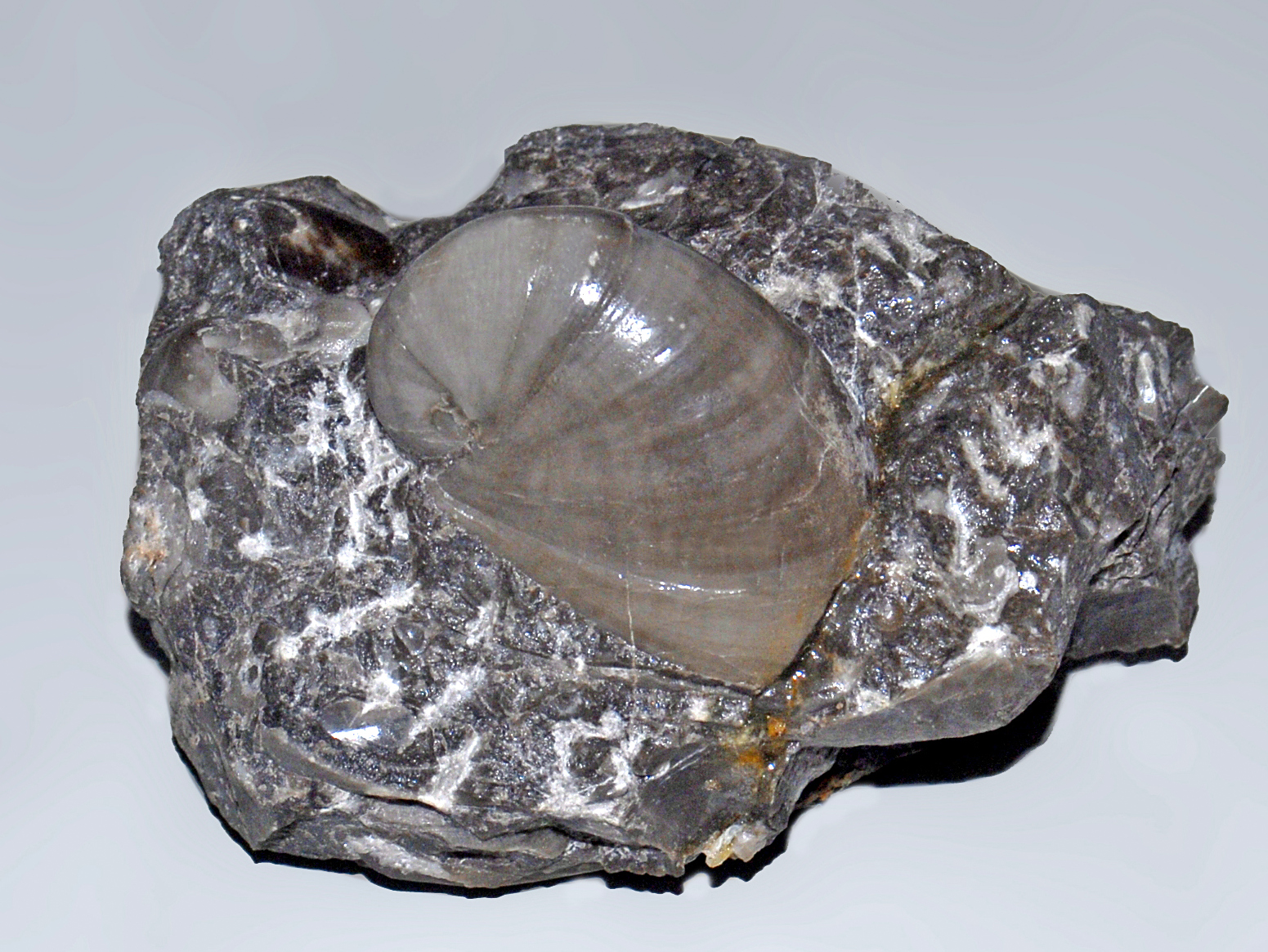
- Fossilized shell of the Early Devonian – Triassic sea snail Naticopsis
  †Naticopsis
- †Neoaganides
  - †Neoaganides grahamensis
- †Neochonetes
  - †Neochonetes granulifer
- †Neodimorphoceras
  - †Neodimorphoceras texanum
- †Neospirifer
  - †Neospirifer cameratus
  - †Neospirifer dunbari
  - †Neospirifer kansasensis
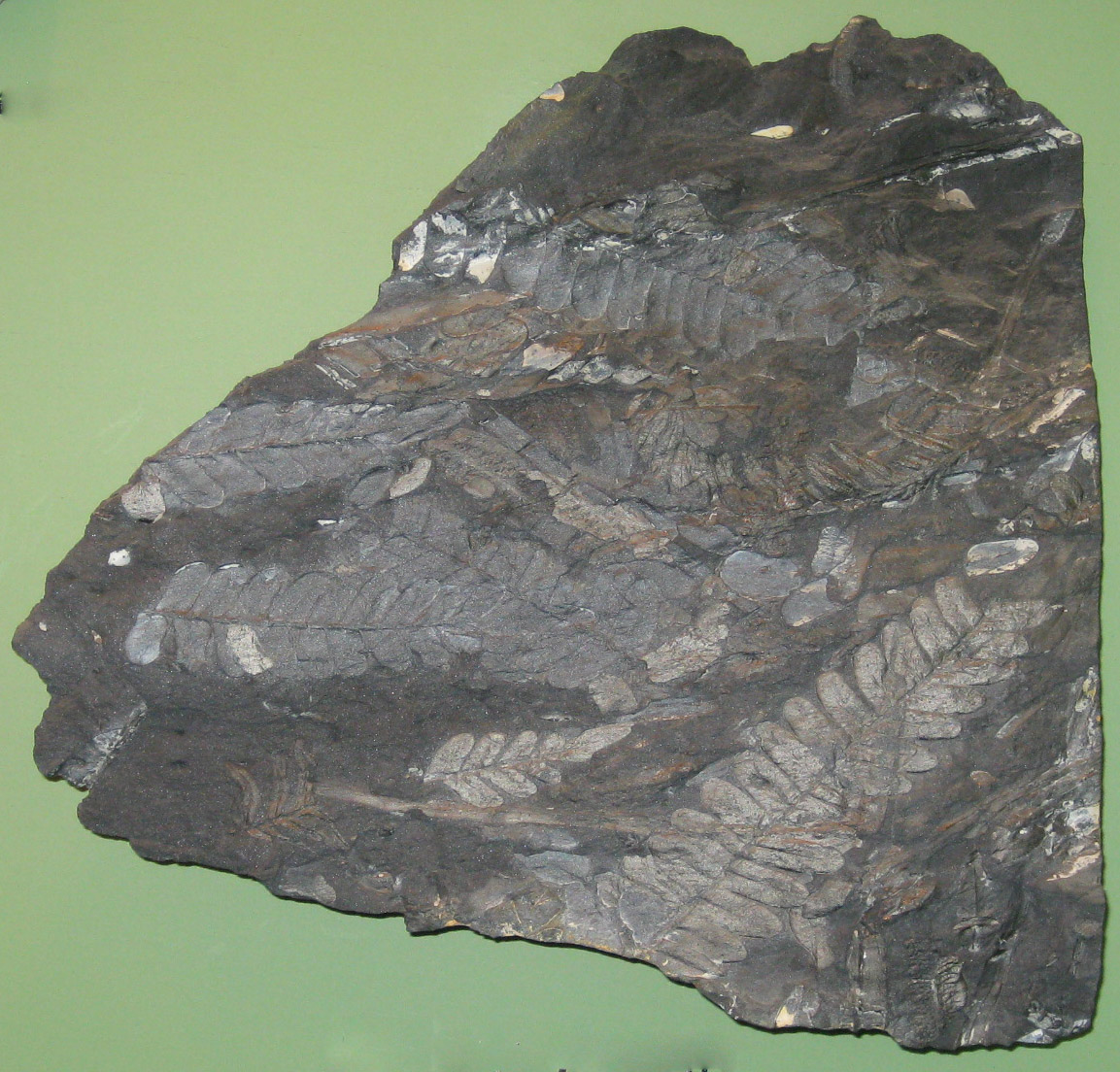
- Fronds of the Carboniferous seed fern Neuropteris
  †Neuropteris
  - †Neuropteris auriculata – tentative report
  - †Neuropteris odontopteroides
  - †Neuropteris ovata
  - †Neuropteris permiana
  - †Neuropteris scheuchzeri
- †Noeggerathia
- †Norwoodia
  - †Norwoodia angustum
- Nucula
- Nuculana
- †Nuculopsis
- †Nugonioneura – type locality for genus
  - †Nugonioneura problematica – type locality for species

== O ==
- †Odonopteris
  - †Odonopteris minor
- †Odontopteris
  - †Odontopteris brardii
  - †Odontopteris excelsa
- †Oligotypus – type locality for genus
  - †Oligotypus tillyardi – type locality for species
- †Omphalotrochus
  - †Omphalotrochus obtusispira
  - †Omphalotrochus wolfcampensis
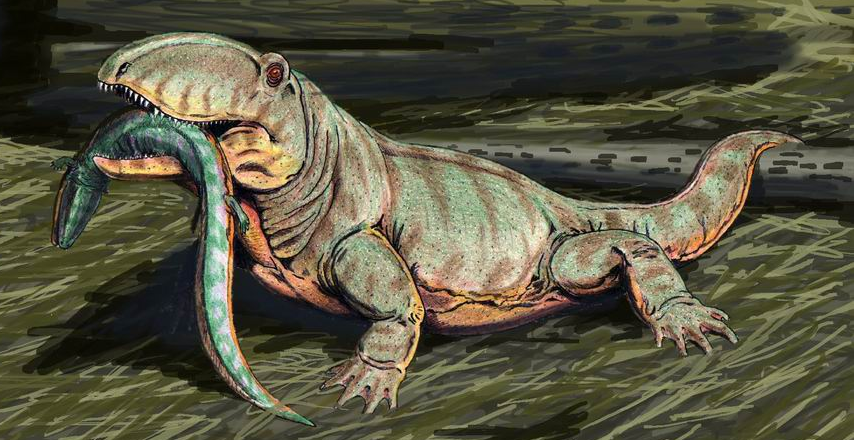
- Life restoration of the Carboniferous-Permian synapsid (mammal precursor) Ophiacodon
  †Ophiacodon – type locality for genus
  - †Ophiacodon hilli – type locality for species
- †Opisthocladus – type locality for genus
  - †Opisthocladus arcuatus – type locality for species
  - †Opisthocladus strictus – type locality for species
- †Opter – type locality for genus
  - †Opter brongniartii – type locality for species
- †Orbiculoidea
  - †Orbiculoidea capuliformis
  - †Orbiculoidea missouriensis
  - †Orbiculoidea tenulineata – or unidentified comparable form
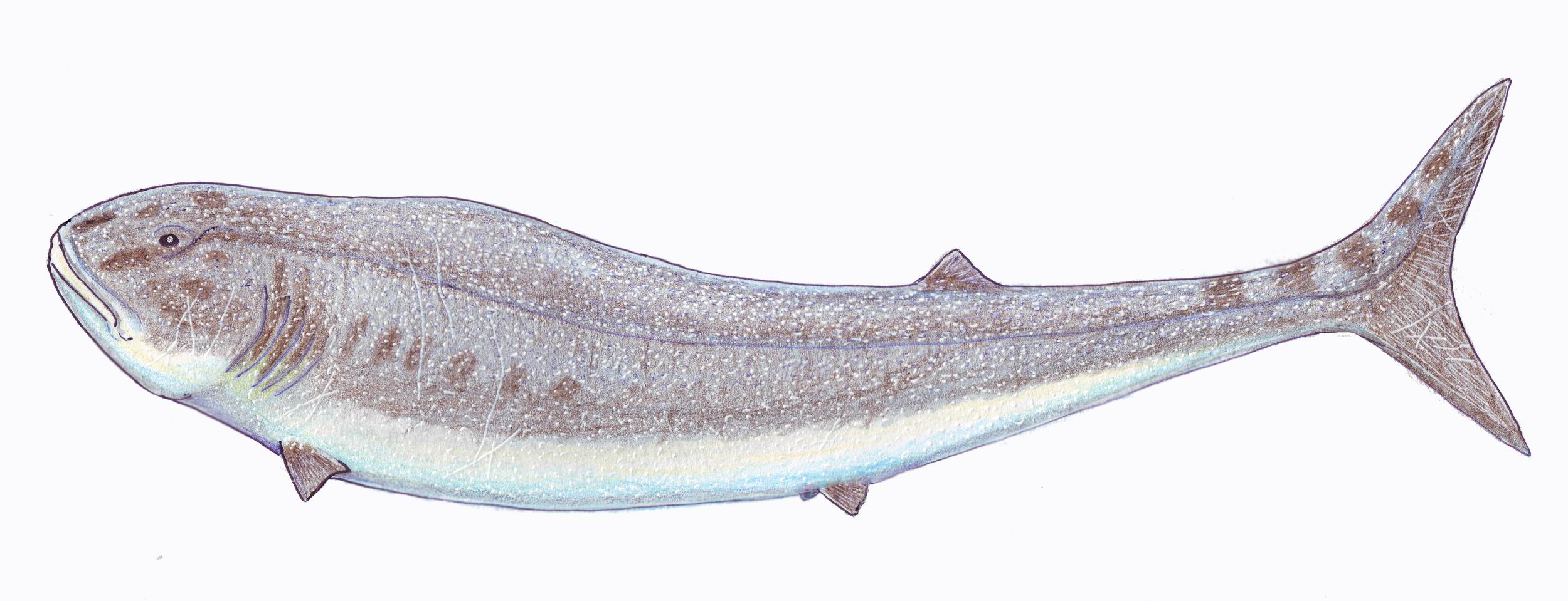
- Restoration of the Carboniferous-Permian cartilaginous fish Orodus
  †Orodus
- †Orthacanthus
- †Orthomyalina
  - †Orthomyalina slocomi
  - †Orthomyalina subquadrata
- †Orthopsocus – type locality for genus
  - †Orthopsocus singularis – type locality for species
- †Osagia –

== P ==
- †Pachytesta
- †Palaeocaudina
  - †Palaeocaudina kansasensis
- †Palaeolima
  - †Palaeolima retifera – tentative report
- †Palaeoneilo
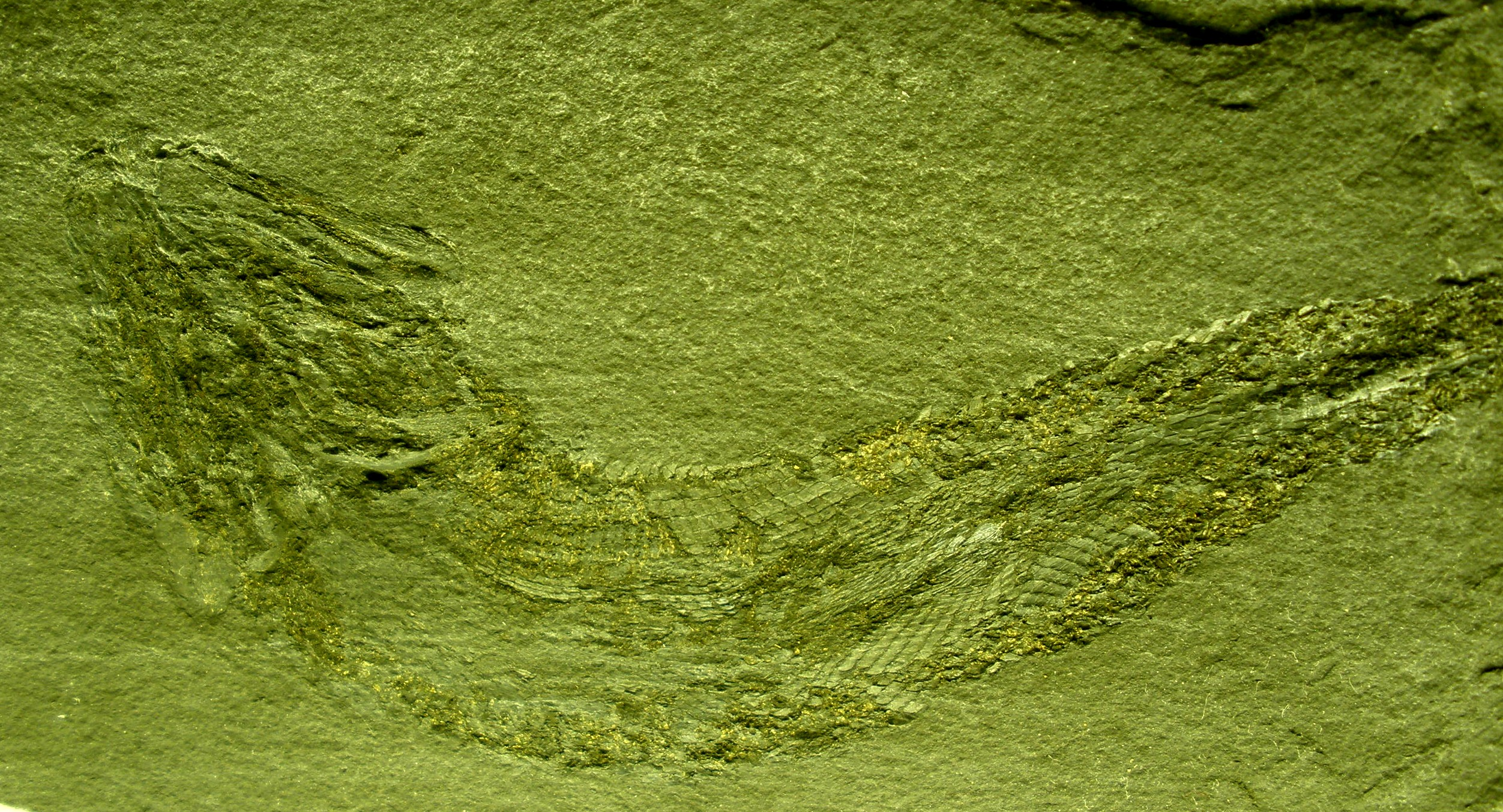
- Fossilized skeleton of the Permian bony fish Palaeoniscum
  †Palaeoniscus
- †Palaeopisthacanthus
  - †Palaeopisthacanthus vogelandurdeni – type locality for species
- †Palaeostachya
  - †Palaeostachya andrewsii
- †Palaeostachys
  - †Palaeostachys andrewsii
- †Palaeostylus
- †Paleolimulus – type locality for genus
  - †Paleolimulus signatus – type locality for species
- †Paleoscytina – type locality for genus
  - †Paleoscytina brevistigma – type locality for species
- †Paleostachya
- †Paleuthygramma
  - †Paleuthygramma acuta – type locality for species
- †Paleyoldia
  - †Paleyoldia subscitula
- †Parablattelytron – type locality for genus
  - †Parablattelytron delicatum – type locality for species
  - †Parablattelytron elongatum – type locality for species
  - †Parablattelytron latum
  - †Parablattelytron rectum – type locality for species
  - †Parablattelytron subincisum – type locality for species
- †Parabrodia – type locality for genus
  - †Parabrodia carbonaria – type locality for species
- †Paracladus – type locality for genus
  - †Paracladus retardatus – type locality for species
- †Paraconularia
- †Paragassizocrinus
- †Parajuresania
  - †Parajuresania nebrascensis
- †Parallelodon
- †Paramphicrinus
- †Paraparchites
  - †Paraparchites humerosus
  - †Paraparchites magnus – type locality for species
  - †Paraparchites perminutus – type locality for species
  - †Paraparchites punctatus – type locality for species
- †Paraprisca – type locality for genus
  - †Paraprisca fragilis – type locality for species
  - †Paraprisca grandis – type locality for species
- †Paroedischia – type locality for genus
  - †Paroedischia recta – type locality for species
- †Parvispina – type locality for genus
  - †Parvispina harpago – type locality for species
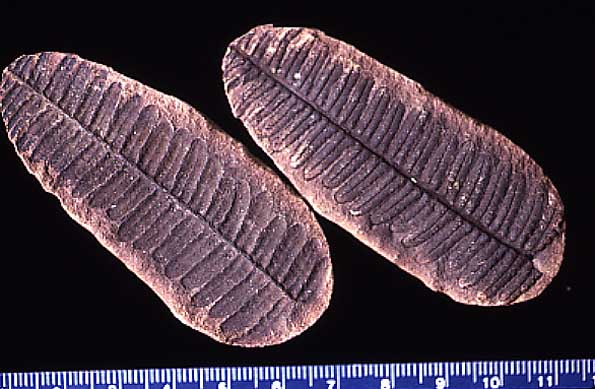
- Fossils of the Late Devonian-Permian fern-like fronds Pecopteris
  †Pecopteris
  - †Pecopteris bucklandi – tentative report
  - †Pecopteris geinitzi – or unidentified comparable form
  - †Pecopteris hemitelioides
  - †Pecopteris pinnatifida
  - †Pecopteris polymorpha
  - †Pecopteris unita
- †Penniretepora
  - †Penniretepora auernigiana
  - †Penniretepora curvula – type locality for species
  - †Penniretepora flexistriata – type locality for species
  - †Penniretepora nodocarinata – type locality for species
  - †Penniretepora nodolineata – type locality for species
  - †Penniretepora pustulosa
- †Pennoceras – tentative report
- †Permelytron – type locality for genus
  - †Permelytron schucherti – type locality for species
- †Permelytropsis – type locality for genus
  - †Permelytropsis cubitalis – type locality for species
- †Permembia – type locality for genus
  - †Permembia delicatula – type locality for species
- †Permoberotha – type locality for genus
  - †Permoberotha villosa – type locality for species
- †Permobiella – type locality for genus
  - †Permobiella perspicua – type locality for species
- †Permoblattina – type locality for genus
  - †Permoblattina curta – type locality for species
  - †Permoblattina permiana – type locality for species
- †Permohymen – type locality for genus
  - †Permohymen schucherti – type locality for species
- †Permoneura – type locality for genus
  - †Permoneura lameerei – type locality for species
- †Permopanorpa
  - †Permopanorpa formosa – type locality for species
  - †Permopanorpa inaequalis – type locality for species
  - †Permopanorpa schucherti – type locality for species
- †Permophorus
  - †Permophorus oblongus
  - †Permophorus subcostata – or unidentified comparable form
  - †Permophorus subcostatus
- †Permopsocus – type locality for genus
  - †Permopsocus latipennis – type locality for species
  - †Permopsocus ovatus – type locality for species
- †Permopsylla – type locality for genus
  - †Permopsylla americana – type locality for species
  - †Permopsylla anomala – type locality for species
  - †Permopsylla grandis – type locality for species
  - †Permopsylla minuta – type locality for species
  - †Permopsylla permiana – type locality for species
- †Permoraphidia – type locality for genus
  - †Permoraphidia americana – type locality for species
  - †Permoraphidia grandis – type locality for species
- †Pernopecten
  - †Pernopecten aviculatus
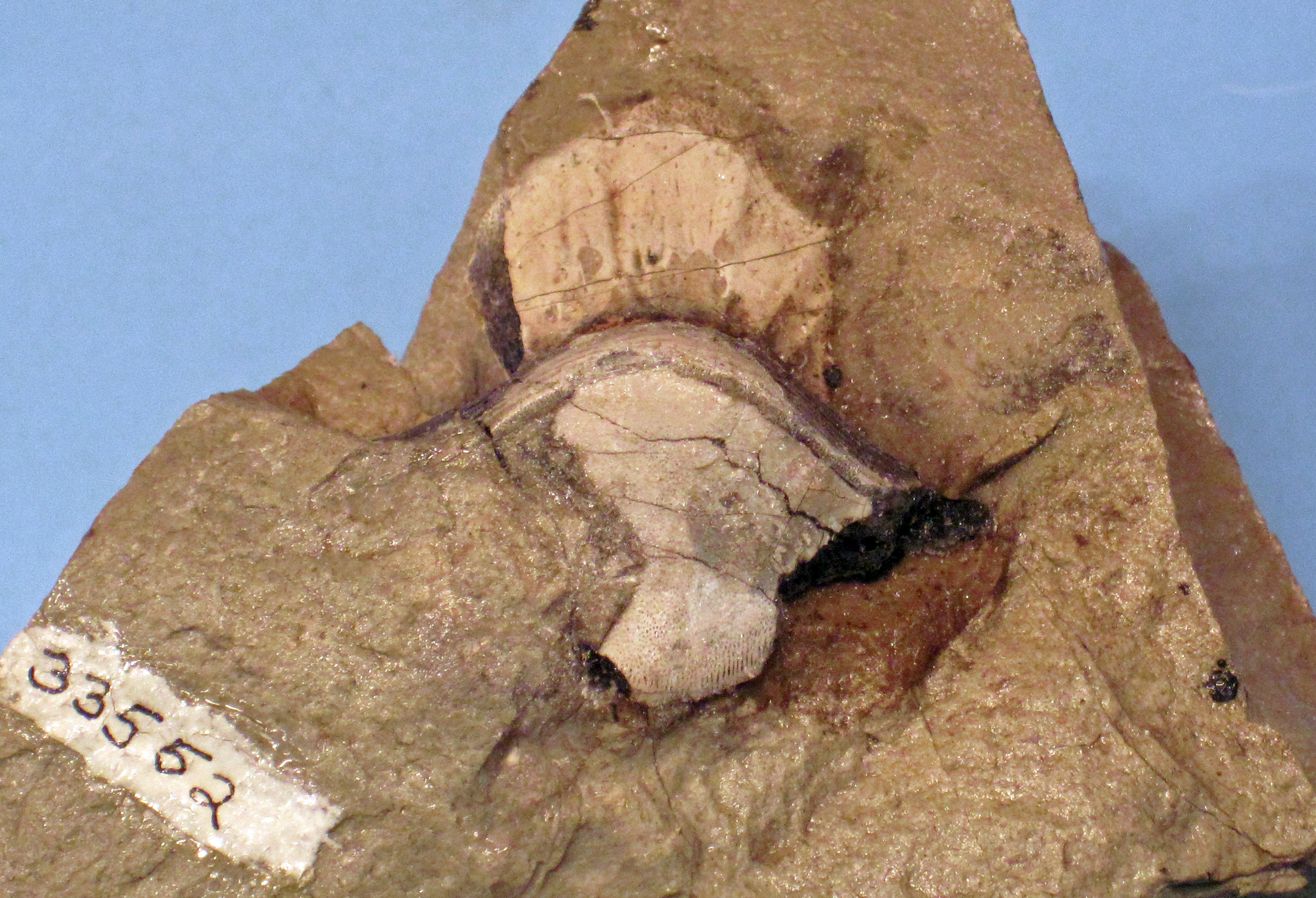
- Fossilized tooth of the Carboniferous-Permian shark Petalodus
  †Petalodus
  - †Petalodus allegheniensis
  - †Petalodus arcuatus
  - †Petalodus jewetti – type locality for species
  - †Petalodus ohioensis
- †Petrelcana – type locality for genus
  - †Petrelcana elongata – type locality for species
- †Petrocrania
  - †Petrocrania modesta
- †Petrodus
  - †Petrodus patelliformis
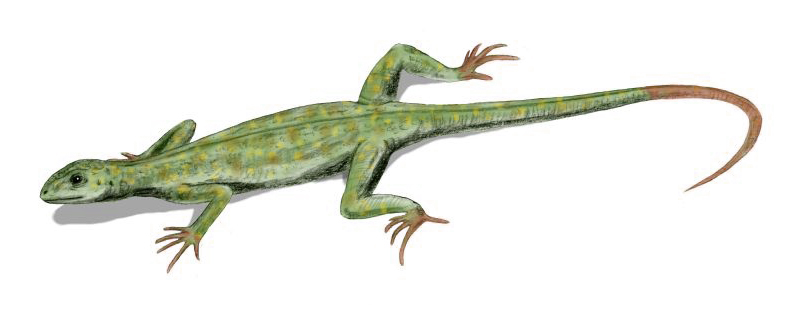
- Life restoration of the Carboniferous reptile Petrolacosaurus
  †Petrolacosaurus – type locality for genus
  - †Petrolacosaurus kansensis – type locality for species
- †Phanerotrema
- †Pharkidonotus
  - †Pharkidonotus percarinatus
- †Phasmatocycas
  - †Phasmatocycas kansana
- †Phenopterum – type locality for genus
  - †Phenopterum elongatum – type locality for species
- †Phestia
  - †Phestia arata
- †Phillipsia – tentative report
- †Phricodothyris
- †Phyloblatta – type locality for genus
  - †Phyloblatta brevicubitalis – type locality for species
  - †Phyloblatta compacta – type locality for species
  - †Phyloblatta curtula – type locality for species
  - †Phyloblatta curvata – type locality for species
  - †Phyloblatta fulvana – type locality for species
  - †Phyloblatta fulvella – type locality for species
  - †Phyloblatta fusca – type locality for species
  - †Phyloblatta kansasia – type locality for species
  - †Phyloblatta lawrenceana – type locality for species
  - †Phyloblatta lugubris – type locality for species
  - †Phyloblatta magna – type locality for species
  - †Phyloblatta occidentalis – type locality for species
  - †Phyloblatta savagei – type locality for species
  - †Phyloblatta separanda
- †Phymatopleura
  - †Phymatopleura brazoensis – or unidentified related form
- †Physonemus
  - †Physonemus asper
  - †Physonemus mirabilis
- †Pilosisporites
  - †Pilosisporites aculealatus
- †Pinnatopora
- †Pityosporites
- †Plagioglypta
- †Platyceras
- †Platychorista – type locality for genus
  - †Platychorista venosa – type locality for species
- †Platysaccus
  - †Platysaccus saarensis
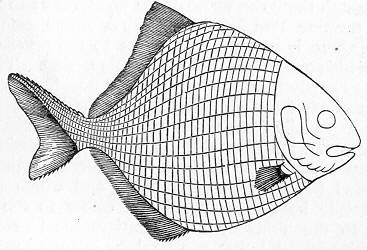
- Life restoration of the Carboniferous-Permian bony fish Platysomus
  †Platysomus
  - †Platysomus swaffordae – type locality for species
- †Plaxocrinus
  - †Plaxocrinus gloukosensis – or unidentified comparable form
- †Pleisiogramma – type locality for genus
  - †Pleisiogramma medialis – type locality for species
- Pleurotomaria
- †Plummericrinus
- †Poacordaites
  - †Poacordaites linearis
- †Polaricyclus
  - †Polaricyclus ballardensis – type locality for species
- †Polidevcia
  - †Polidevcia arata
- †Polypora
  - †Polypora aestacella
  - †Polypora elliptica
  - †Polypora endoi
  - †Polypora fujimotoi
  - †Polypora gigantea
  - †Polypora moorei
  - †Polypora submarginata
- †Polytaxis
- †Potonieisporites
  - †Potonieisporites elegans
  - †Potonieisporites novicus
  - †Potonieisporites simplex
- †Prismopora
  - †Prismopora triangulata
- †Probnis – type locality for genus
  - †Probnis speciosa – type locality for species
- †Progoneura – type locality for genus
  - †Progoneura minuta – type locality for species
- †Progonopsocus – type locality for genus
  - †Progonopsocus permianus – type locality for species
- †Promartynovia – type locality for genus
  - †Promartynovia venicosta – type locality for species
- †Promytilus
  - †Promytilus vetulus
- †Properrinites – type locality for genus
  - †Properrinites plummeri – type locality for species
- †Prosaites – type locality for genus
  - †Prosaites compactus – type locality for species
  - †Prosaites secundus – type locality for species
- †Protelytron – type locality for genus
  - †Protelytron angustum – type locality for species
  - †Protelytron dunbari – type locality for species
  - †Protelytron furcatum – type locality for species
  - †Protelytron permianum – type locality for species
- †Protelytropsis – type locality for genus
  - †Protelytropsis grandis – type locality for species
- †Protembia – type locality for genus
  - †Protembia permiana – type locality for species
- †Protereisma – type locality for genus
  - †Protereisma arcuatum – type locality for species
  - †Protereisma elongatum – type locality for species
  - †Protereisma insigne – type locality for species
  - †Protereisma latum – type locality for species
  - †Protereisma permianum – type locality for species
  - †Protereisma sellardsi – type locality for species
- †Protochorista – type locality for genus
  - †Protochorista tetraclada – type locality for species
- †Protohaploxipinus
- †Protohymen – type locality for genus
  - †Protohymen elongatus – type locality for species
  - †Protohymen permianus – type locality for species
  - †Protohymen readi – type locality for species
  - †Protohymen tenuis – type locality for species
- †Protopanorpa – type locality for genus
  - †Protopanorpa permiana – type locality for species
- †Pryg – type locality for genus
  - †Pryg absurdus – type locality for species
- †Pseudaktubites
  - †Pseudaktubites stainbrooki
- †Pseudobigalea
- †Pseudobythocypris
  - †Pseudobythocypris pediformis
- †Pseudofusulina
  - †Pseudofusulina delicata – type locality for species
- †Pseudomonotis
  - †Pseudomonotis hawni – type locality for species
- †Pseudoparaparchites – type locality for genus
  - †Pseudoparaparchites kansensis – type locality for species
- †Pseudorthoceras
  - †Pseudorthoceras knoxense
- †Pseudozygopleura
- †Psoroptera – type locality for genus
  - †Psoroptera cubitalia – type locality for species
- †Ptychocarpus
  - †Ptychocarpus candolliana
  - †Ptychocarpus feminaeformis
  - †Ptychocarpus unitus
- †Ptylopora
- †Punctatisporites
  - †Punctatisporites chapelensis
  - †Punctatisporites compactus
  - †Punctatisporites flavus
  - †Punctatisporites glaber
  - †Punctatisporites grandivermiculatus
  - †Punctatisporites minutus
  - †Punctatisporites obesus
- †Punctatosporites
  - †Punctatosporites compactus
  - †Punctatosporites glaber
  - †Punctatosporites granifer
  - †Punctatosporites minutus
- †Punctospirifer
  - †Punctospirifer kentuckensis
- †Pustulatisporites
- †Pycnoblattina –

== Q ==
- †Quasillinites
  - †Quasillinites diversiformis

== R ==
- †Raistrickia
  - †Raistrickia abdita
  - †Raistrickia aculeata
  - †Raistrickia aculeolata
  - †Raistrickia crinita
  - †Raistrickia crocea
  - †Raistrickia rubida
  - †Raistrickia subcrinita
- †Rectifenestella
  - †Rectifenestella tenax
- †Reticulatia
  - †Reticulatia huecoensis
- †Reticulatisporites
  - †Reticulatisporites muricatus
- †Reticulitriletes
  - †Reticulitriletes clatriformis
  - †Reticulitriletes falsus
  - †Reticulitriletes reticulocingulum
- †Retispira
  - †Retispira tenuilineata
  - †Retispira textiliformis
- †Rhabdocarpus
- †Rhabdomeson
- †Rhipidomella
  - †Rhipidomella carbonaria
- †Rhombopora
  - †Rhombopora lepidodendroides
- †Rhynchopora
  - †Rhynchopora magnicosta
- †Roundyella
  - †Roundyella simplicissima

== S ==
- †Samaropsis
  - †Samaropsis fluitans
- †Sandalodus – or unidentified comparable form
- †Sandrewia
  - †Sandrewia texana
- †Sansabella
  - †Sansabella bolliaformis
- †Savitrisporites
  - †Savitrisporites majus
- †Schistoceras
- †Schizoblattina
  - †Schizoblattina minor – type locality for species
  - †Schizoblattina schucherti – type locality for species
- †Schizodus
  - †Schizodus ovatus – tentative report
  - †Schizodus wheeleri
- †Schizophoria
- †Schizopteris
  - †Schizopteris trichomanoides – or unidentified comparable form
- †Schubertella
  - †Schubertella kingi
- †Schutzia
  - †Schutzia anomala – or unidentified comparable form
- †Scolecopteris
  - †Scolecopteris elegans
- †Secarisporites
  - †Secarisporites remotus
- †Sellardsula – type locality for genus
  - †Sellardsula cordata – type locality for species
  - †Sellardsula radialis – type locality for species
- †Semopterum
  - †Semopterum venosum
- †Septimyalina
  - †Septimyalina burmai
  - †Septimyalina perattenuata
  - †Septimyalina scitula
- †Septopora
  - †Septopora spinulosa
- †Serratodus – or unidentified comparable form
- †Shansiella
- †Shenzhousia
  - †Shenzhousia readi – type locality for species
- †Shleesha
  - †Shleesha pinguis
- †Shumardella
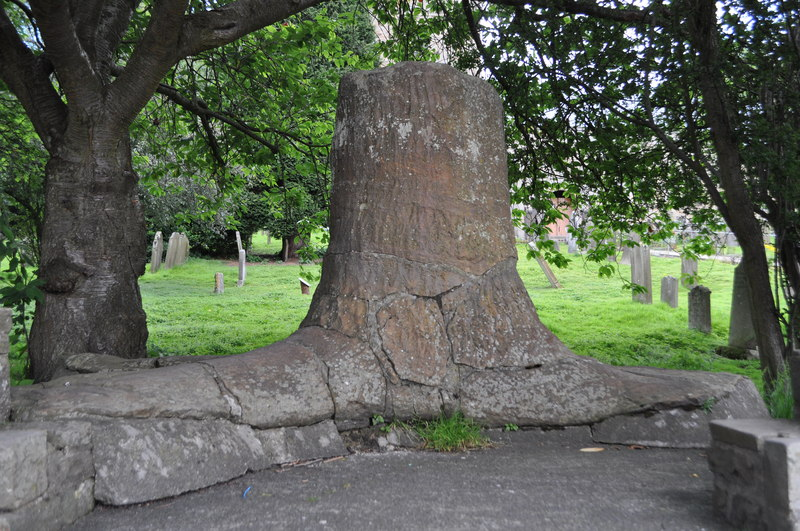
- Fossilized stump of the Carboniferous-Permian club moss relative Sigillaria
  †Sigillaria
  - †Sigillaria brardii
- †Sigillariostrobus
  - †Sigillariostrobus hastatus
- †Silenites
  - †Silenites lenticularis
- †Soleniscus
- †Spackmanites
  - †Spackmanites ellipticus
  - †Spackmanites habibii
- †Spermopteris
  - †Spermopteris coriacea
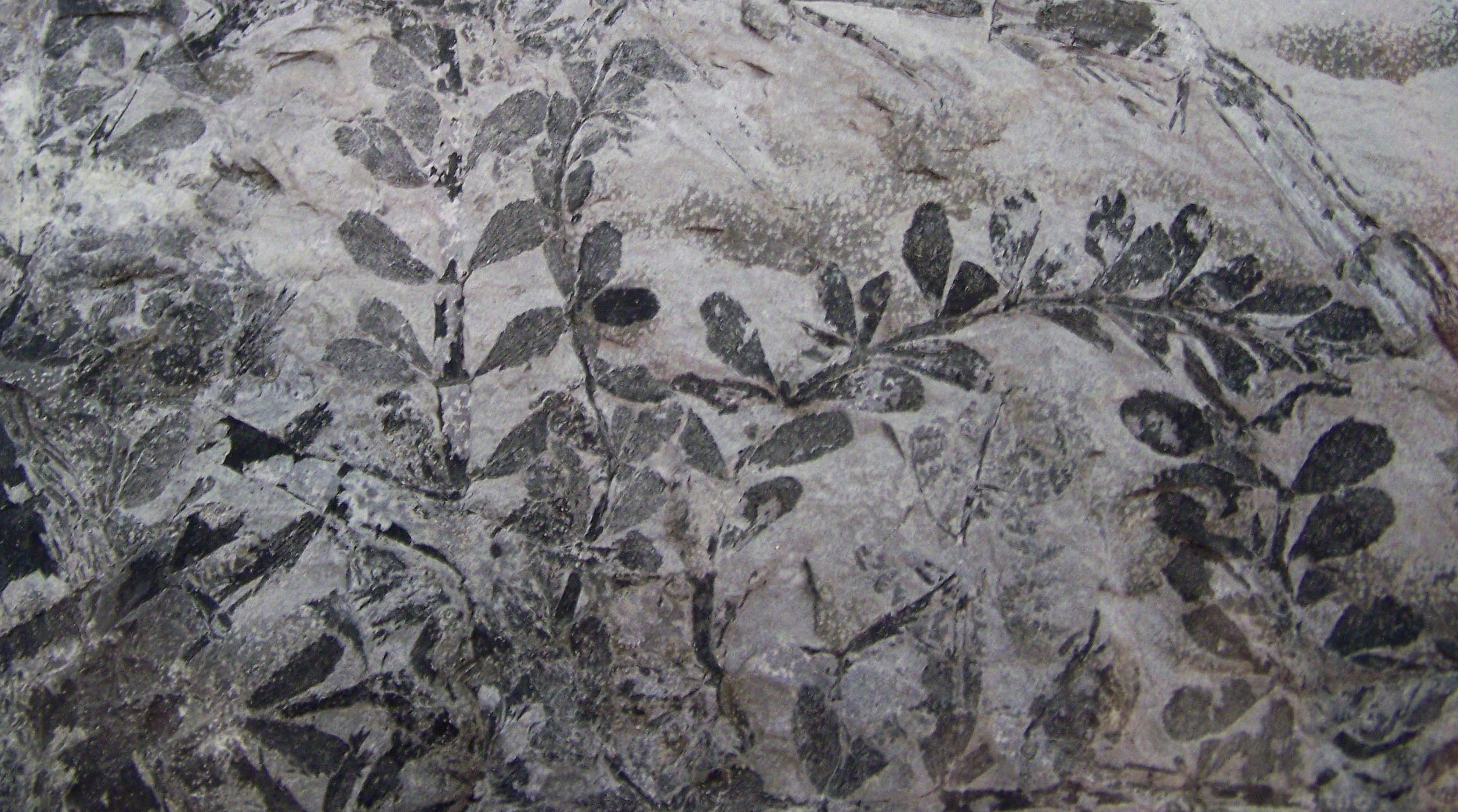
- Fossilized leaves and branches of the Devonian-Triassic horsetail relative Sphenophyllum
  †Sphenophyllum
  - †Sphenophyllum oblongifolium
  - †Sphenophyllum obovatum
  - †Sphenophyllum stoukenbergi – or unidentified comparable form
  - †Sphenophyllum thonii – or unidentified comparable form
- †Sphenopteris
  - †Sphenopteris germanica – or unidentified comparable form
  - †Sphenopteris obtusiloba
  - †Sphenopteris suessi
- †Spiloblattina
  - †Spiloblattina lawrenceana – type locality for species
  - †Spiloblattina laxa – type locality for species
  - †Spiloblattina variegata
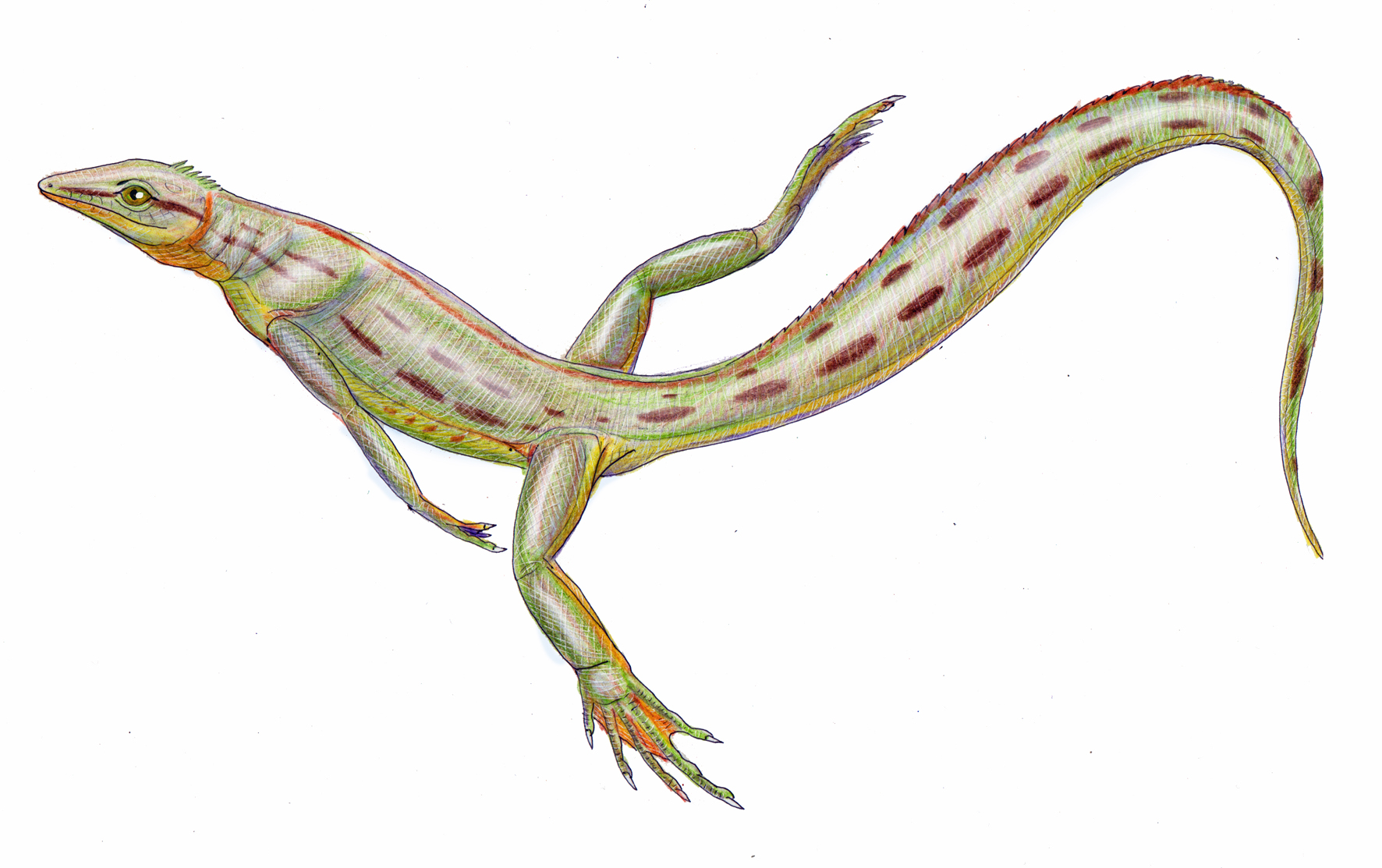
- Restoration of the Carboniferous reptile Spinoaequalis
  †Spinoaequalis – type locality for genus
  - †Spinoaequalis schultzei – type locality for species
- †Spinofenestella
  - †Spinofenestella spinulosa
- †Spinosporites
  - †Spinosporites exiguus
- †Spirifer
  - †Spirifer matheri
  - †Spirifer rockymontanus – tentative report
- Spirorbis
- †Stegocoelia
  - †Stegocoelia quadricarinata
- †Stellarocrinus
- †Stemmatodus
- †Stenopoceras
  - †Stenopoceras cooperi – type locality for species
- †Stenzonotriletes
- †Stereopterum
  - †Stereopterum breve – type locality for species
  - †Stereopterum maculosum – type locality for species
  - †Stereopterum rotundum
- †Stereostylus
  - †Stereostylus annae – type locality for species
  - †Stereostylus milichus – type locality for species
  - †Stereostylus perversus – type locality for species
  - †Stereostylus phainus – type locality for species
- †Stiallia
  - †Stiallia pilosa
- †Stiaria
  - †Stiaria intermedia
- †Streblochondria – tentative report
  - †Streblochondria tenuilineata
- †Streptognathodus
  - †Streptognathodus acuminatus – type locality for species
  - †Streptognathodus elongatus – type locality for species
  - †Streptognathodus farmeri – type locality for species
  - †Streptognathodus flangulatus – type locality for species
  - †Streptognathodus pawhuskaensis
  - †Streptognathodus simplex – type locality for species
  - †Streptognathodus wabaunsensis – type locality for species
  - †Streptognathodus walteri – type locality for species
  - †Streptognathodus zethus
- †Streptorhynchus
  - †Streptorhynchus affine
- †Striatites
  - †Striatites richteri
- †Striatoabietites
- †Striatopodocarpites
- †Striatosaccites – type locality for genus
  - †Striatosaccites tractiferinus
- †Striomonosaccites
- †Strophostylus – type locality for genus
  - †Strophostylus girtyi – type locality for species
- †Subarrectocrinus
  - †Subarrectocrinus perexcavatus
- †Sublobalocrinus
  - †Sublobalocrinus kasseri
- †Subprioniodus
- †Sulcella
  - †Sulcella sulcata
- †Synarmocrinus
  - †Synarmocrinus iatani
- †Syringoclemis
  - †Syringoclemis wrefordensis – type locality for species
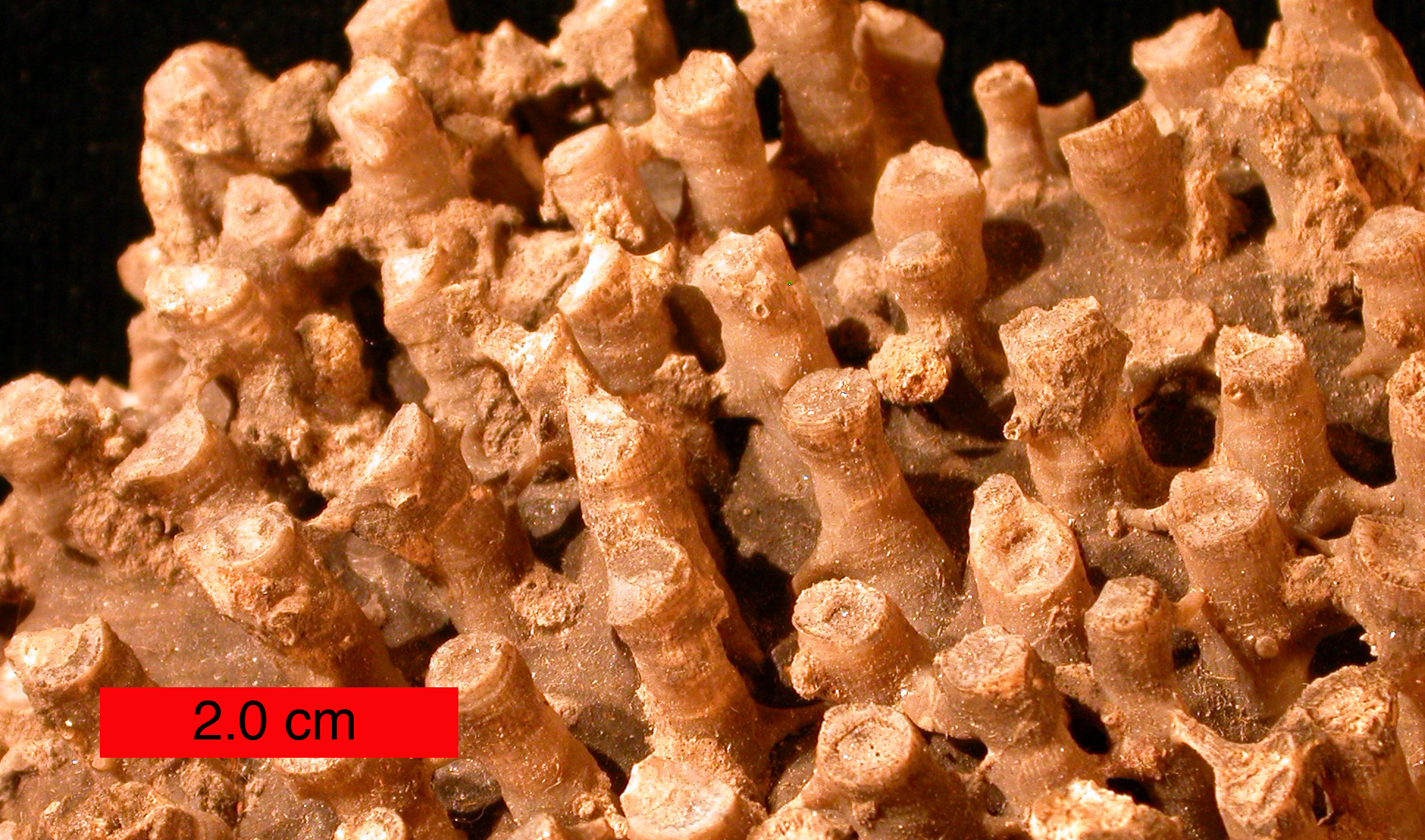
- Fossil of the Devonian tabulate coral Syringopora
  †Syringopora
- †Sysciophlebia
  - †Sysciophlebia arcuata – type locality for species

== T ==
- †Tabulipora
  - †Tabulipora bullata – or unidentified comparable form
  - †Tabulipora carbonaria
  - †Tabulipora hispida – or unidentified comparable form
- †Taeniaesporites
- †Taeniopteris
  - †Taeniopteris angelica
  - †Taeniopteris coriacea
  - †Taeniopteris multinervis
- †Tapopterum
  - †Tapopterum celsum
- †Teguliferina
  - †Teguliferina armata
- †Tenuacaptor – type locality for genus
  - †Tenuacaptor reiszi – type locality for species
- †Terpnocrinus
- †Tetrataxis
- †Therates – type locality for genus
  - †Therates planus – type locality for species
- †Thymospora
  - †Thymospora obscura
  - †Thymospora pseudothiessenii
- †Tococladus – type locality for genus
  - †Tococladus rallus – type locality for species
- †Tonganoxichnus
  - †Tonganoxichnus buildexensis
  - †Tonganoxichnus ottawensis
- †Torispora
  - †Torispora securis
- †Trachopteryx – type locality for genus
  - †Trachopteryx martynovi – type locality for species
- †Trachydomia
  - †Trachydomia wheeleri – tentative report
- †Trecospira
- †Trepospira
  - †Trepospira discoidalis – type locality for species
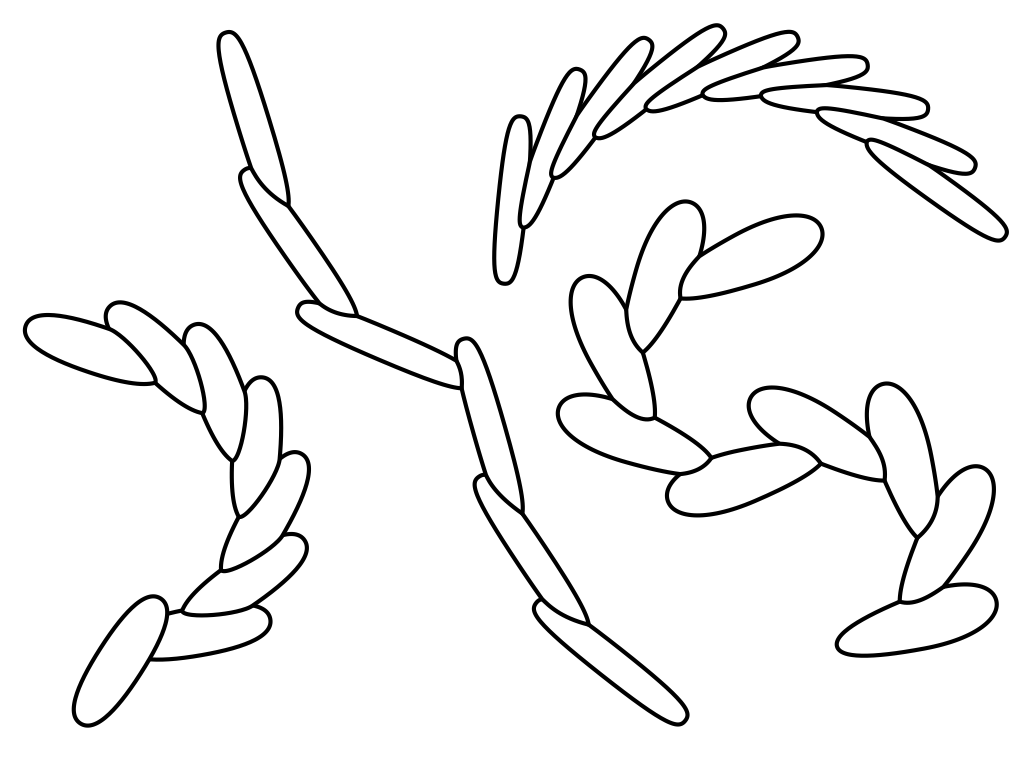
- Illustration in side view of several fossils of the Cambrian burrow ichnogenus Treptichnus
  †Treptichnus
  - †Treptichnus bifurcus
  - †Treptichnus pollardi
- †Tribolbina – type locality for genus
  - †Tribolbina permiana – type locality for species
- †Trigonocarpus
- †Triletes
- †Triquitrites
  - †Triquitrites additus
  - †Triquitrites bransonii
  - †Triquitrites crassus
  - †Triquitrites exiguus
  - †Triquitrites minutus
  - †Triquitrites sculptilis
  - †Triquitrites spinosus
  - †Triquitrites subspinosus
- †Triticites
  - †Triticites brownvillensis – type locality for species
  - †Triticites confertus
  - †Triticites eoextenta
  - †Triticites pointensis
- Trypetesa
  - †Trypetesa caveata
  - †Trypetesa lampas – type locality for species
- †Tupus – type locality for genus
  - †Tupus permianus – type locality for species

== U ==
- †Uddenoceras
- †Ullmannia
- †Ulocrinus
  - †Ulocrinus fistulosus – type locality for species
- †Uncinulina
  - †Uncinulina lunata – type locality for species
- †Undichna
  - †Undichna britannica
  - †Undichna simplicitas
- †Urba – type locality for genus
  - †Urba punctata – type locality for species

== V ==
- †Verrucosisporites
  - †Verrucosisporites donarii
  - †Verrucosisporites microtuberosus
  - †Verrucosisporites verrocosus
- †Verrusosisporites
  - †Verrusosisporites microruberosus
- †Vesicaspora
  - †Vesicaspora schaubergeri
  - †Vesicaspora wilsonii
- †Vestigisporites
- †Vestispora
  - †Vestispora fenestrata
  - †Vestispora foveata
- †Vidrioceras
  - †Vidrioceras conlini
- †Volsellina
  - †Volsellina subelliptica
- †Voltzia
- †Vosellina
  - †Vosellina subelliptica

== W ==
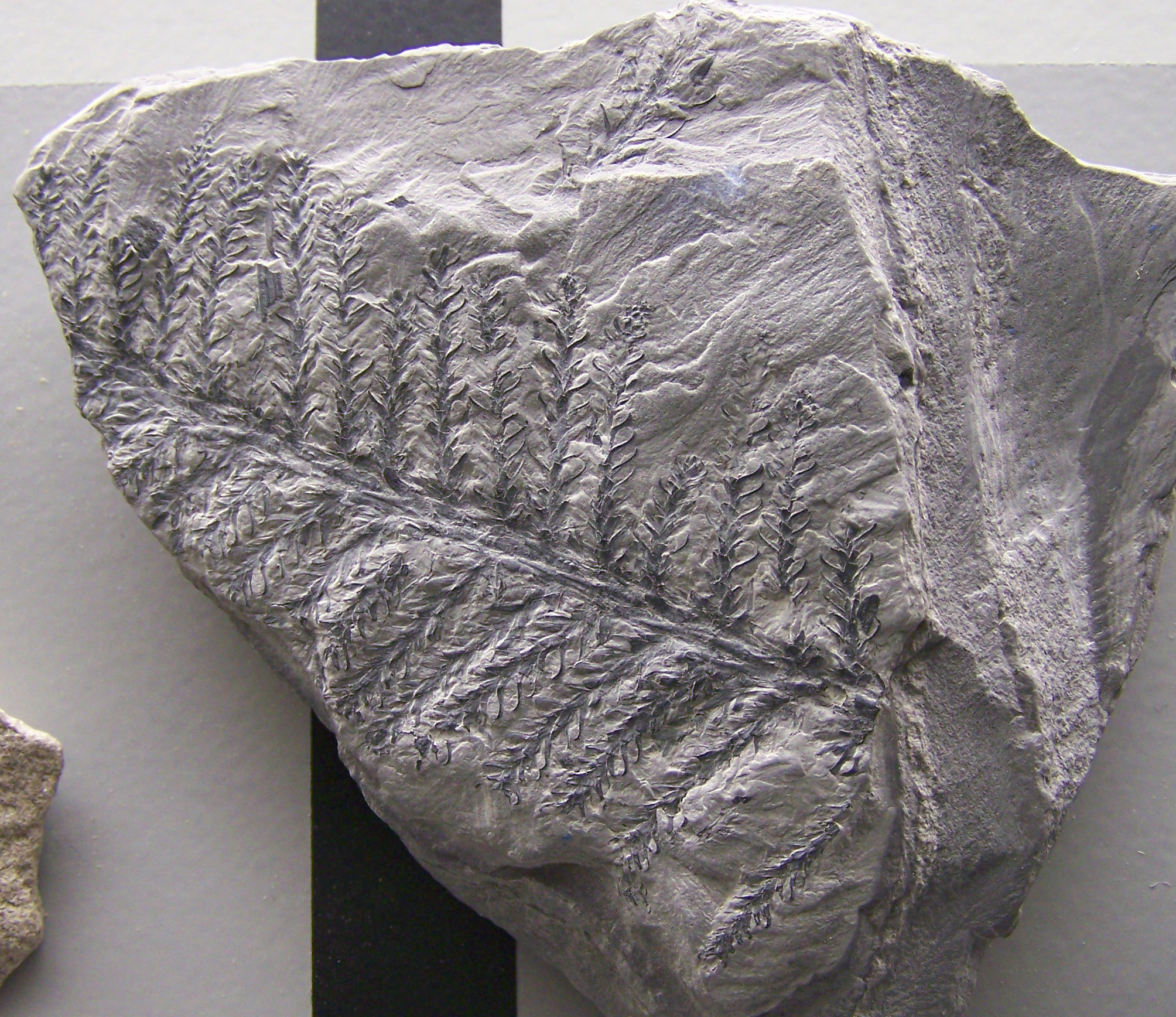
- Fossilized foliage of the Carboniferous-Permian conifer Walchia
  †Walchia
  - †Walchia filiciformis – or unidentified comparable form
  - †Walchia piniformis
  - †Walchia schneideri
- †Warthia
  - †Warthia kingi – type locality for species
- †Wellerella
  - †Wellerella cooperi
  - †Wellerella delicatula – or unidentified comparable form
  - †Wellerella osagensis
  - †Wellerella tetrahedra
  - †Wellerella truncata
- †Wilkingia
  - †Wilkingia terminale
- †Williamsella
  - †Williamsella striata – type locality for species
  - †Williamsella typicalis
- †Wilsonites
  - †Wilsonites circularis
  - †Wilsonites delicatus
  - †Wilsonites vesicatus
- †Worthenia

== X ==
- †Xyrospondylus
  - †Xyrospondylus ecordi – type locality for species

== Y ==
- Yoldia
  - †Yoldia subscitula

== Z ==
- †Zygopleura
