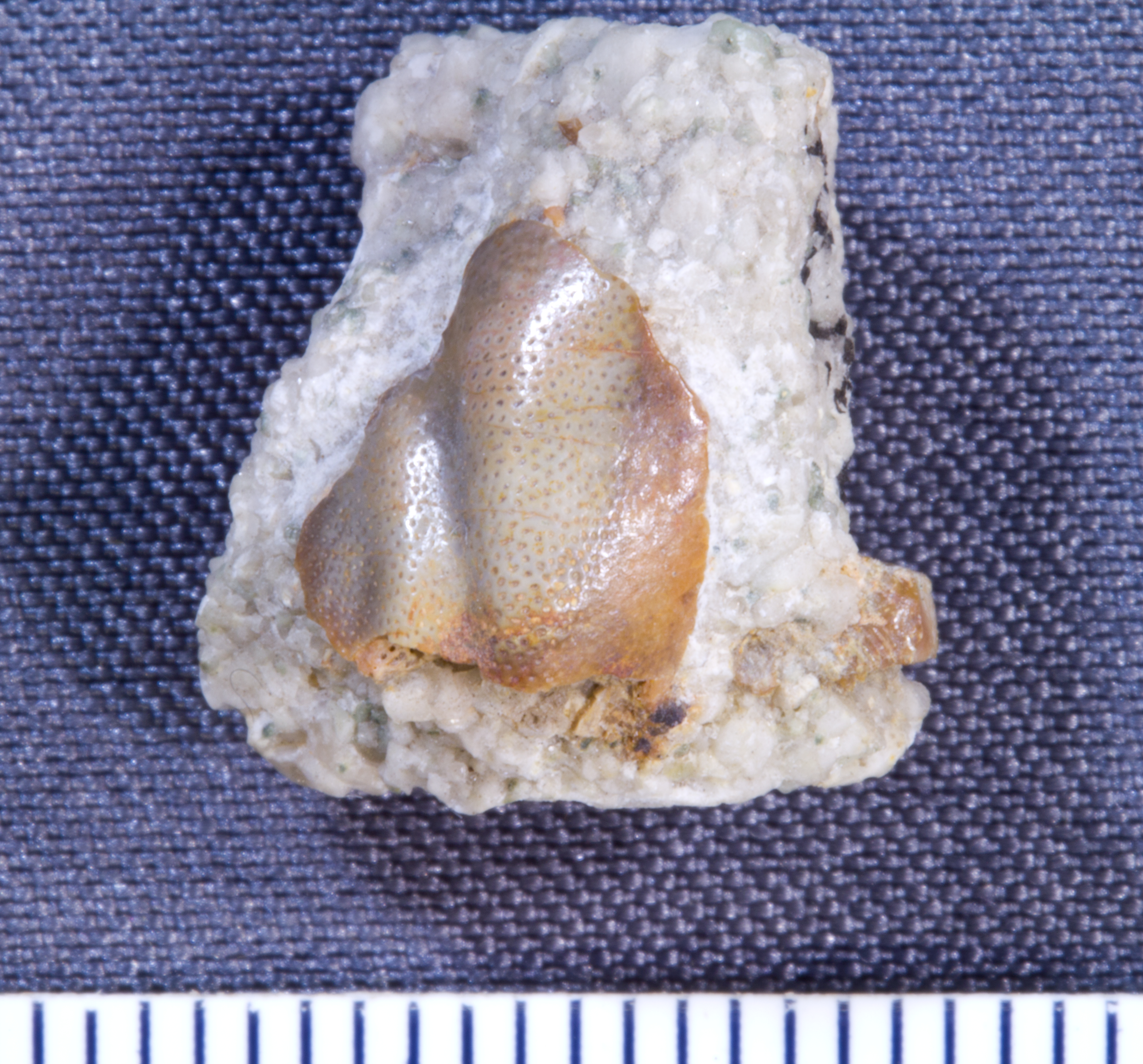
- Tooth of D. primus
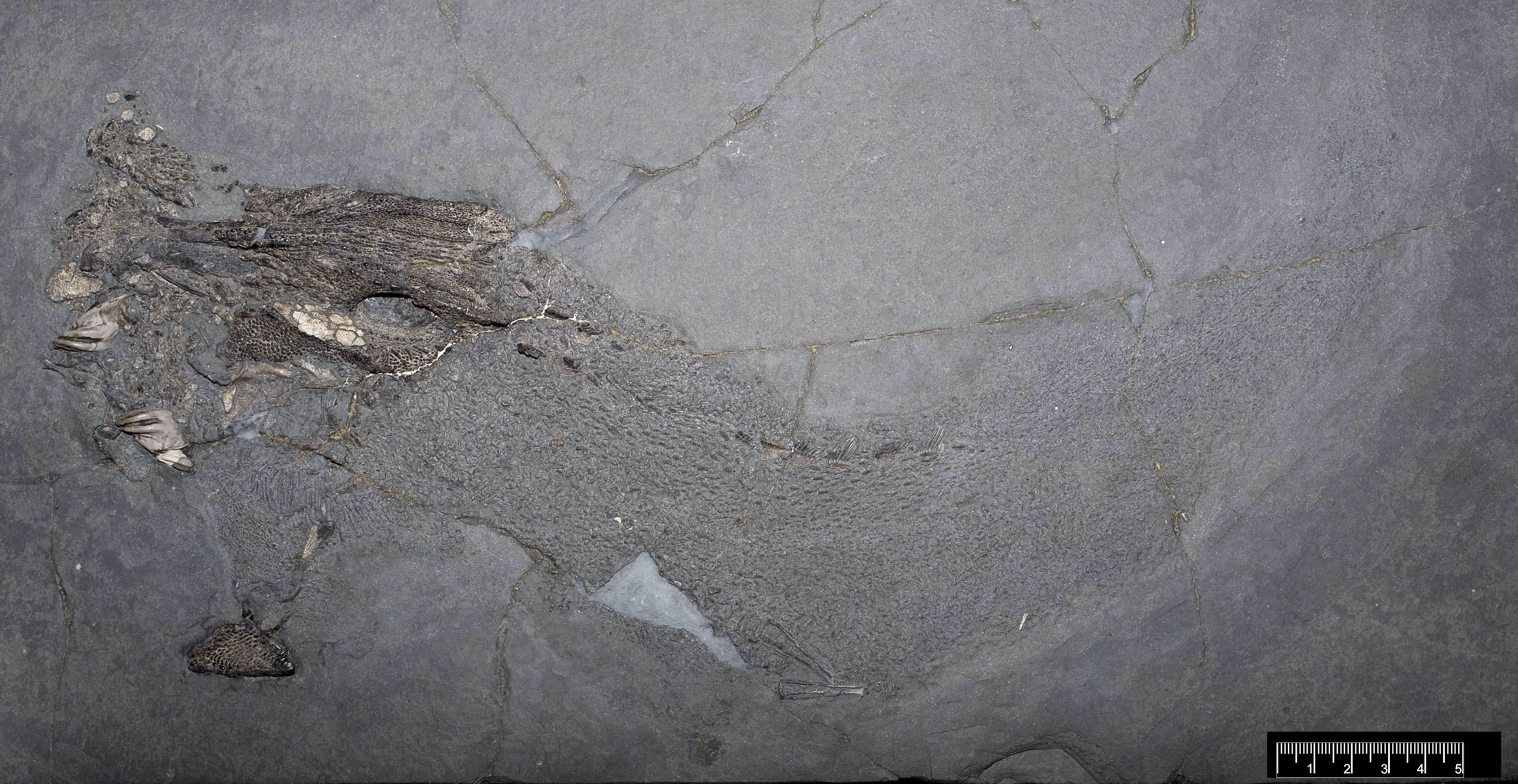
- Well-preserved body fossil of D. armigerus

Scientific classification
- Kingdom: Animalia
- Phylum: Chordata
- Class: Chondrichthyes
- Subclass: Holocephali
- Order: †Menaspiformes
- Family: †Deltoptychiidae
- Genus: †Deltoptychius; Morris & Roberts, 1862

= Deltoptychius =

Deltoptychius Temporal range: Early Carboniferous–Late Carboniferous

Extinct genus of cartilaginous fishes

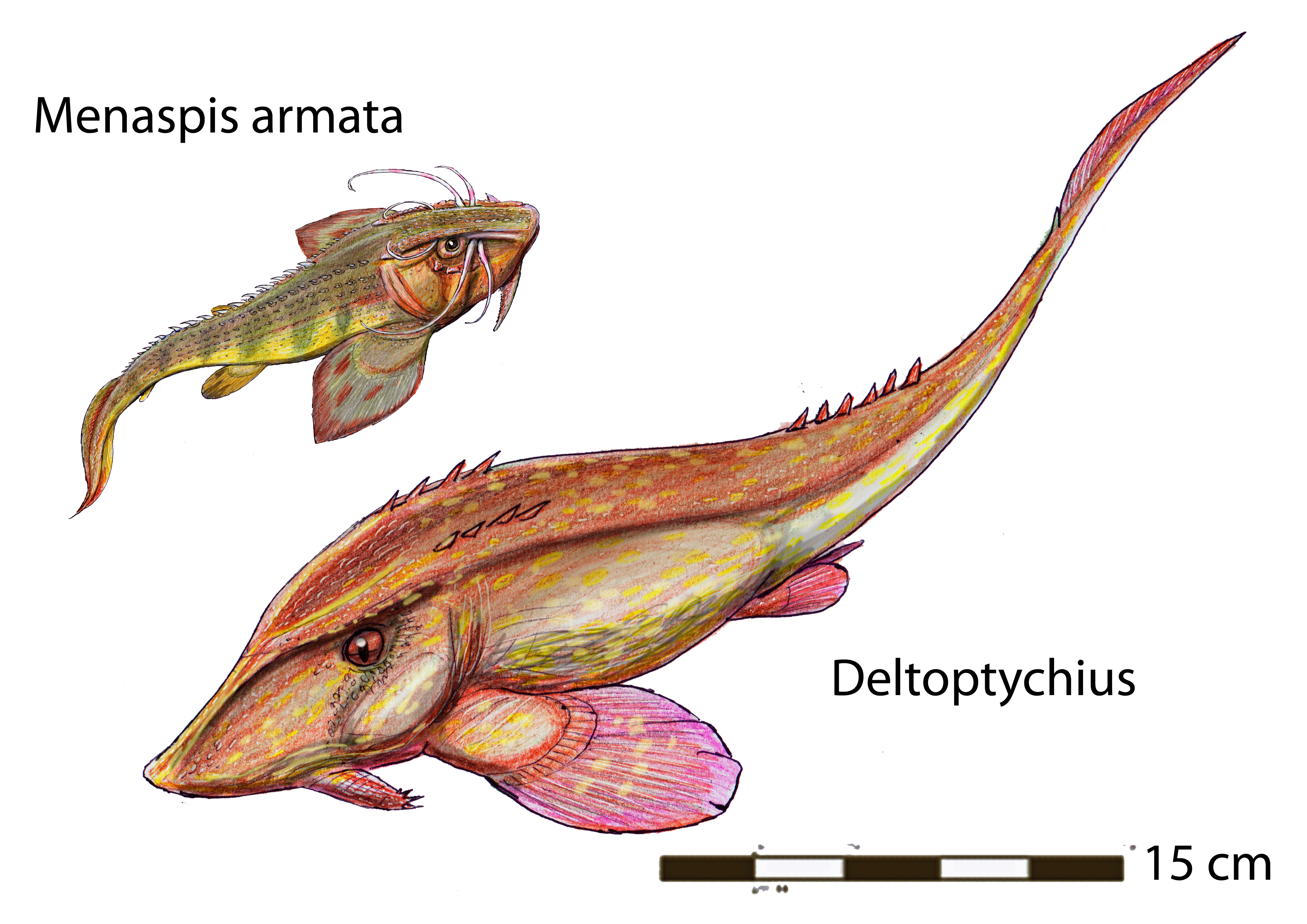
Life reconstruction of Deltoptychius alongside the related menaspiform Menaspis

Deltoptychius (from Greek: δέλτα délta, 'triangle' and Greek: πτυχή ptyche 'fold') is an extinct species of cartilaginous fish related to the modern chimaeras. It lived in the Carboniferous period in present-day United Kingdom. Fossils of the genus have been found in the Glencartholm Volcanic Beds Formation of the Upper Border Group in Scotland.

Although it emerged over 300 million years ago, Deltoptychius was similar in appearance to modern-day chimaeras, possessing a long, whip-like tail and large, wing-like pectoral fins that it probably used to glide through the water. Deltoptychius's large eyes allowed it to hunt in deep waters, crushing shellfish between solid tooth plates in its mouth.
