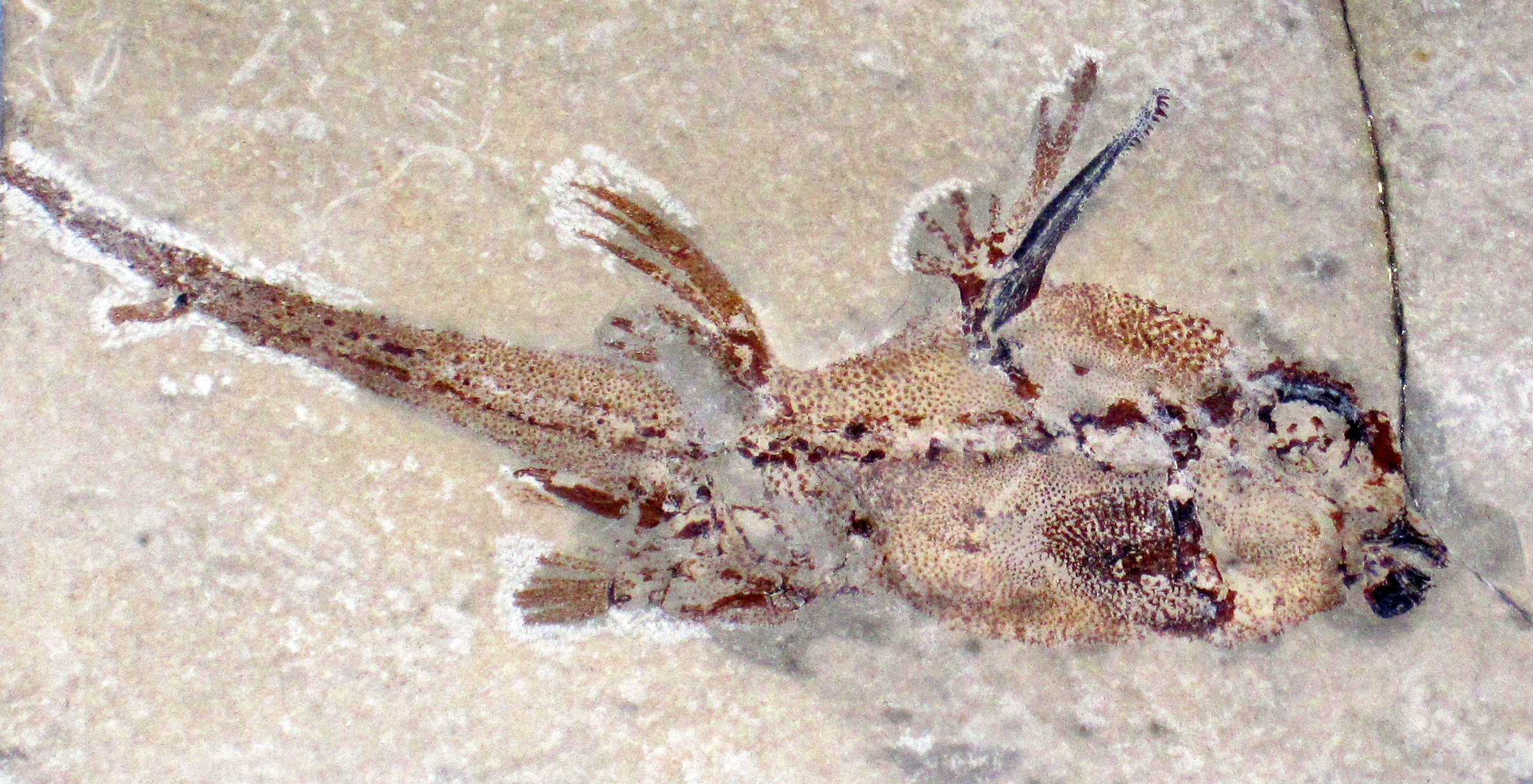
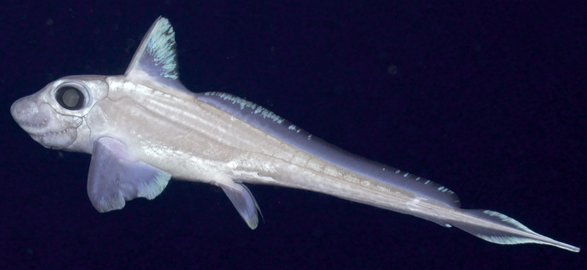
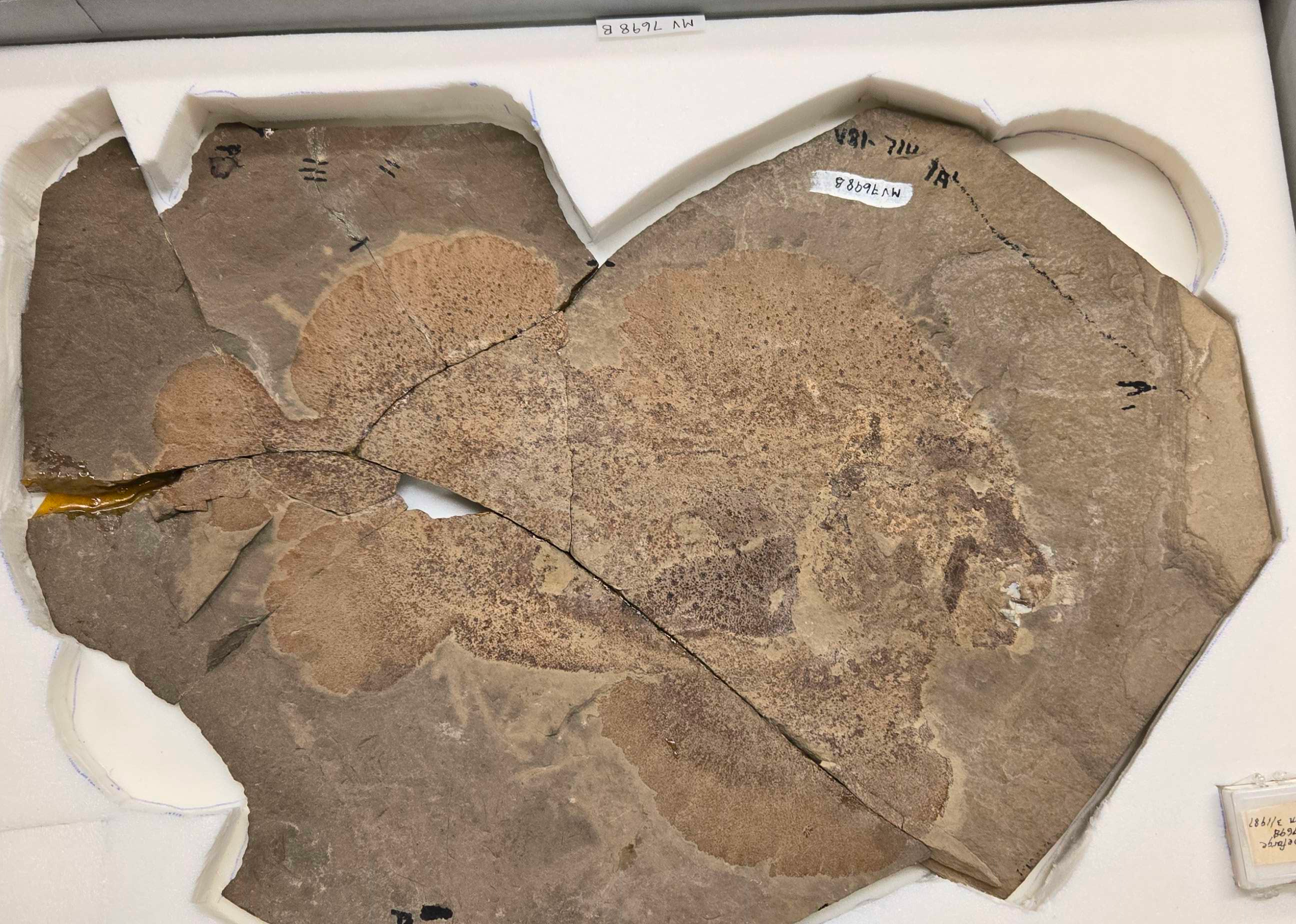
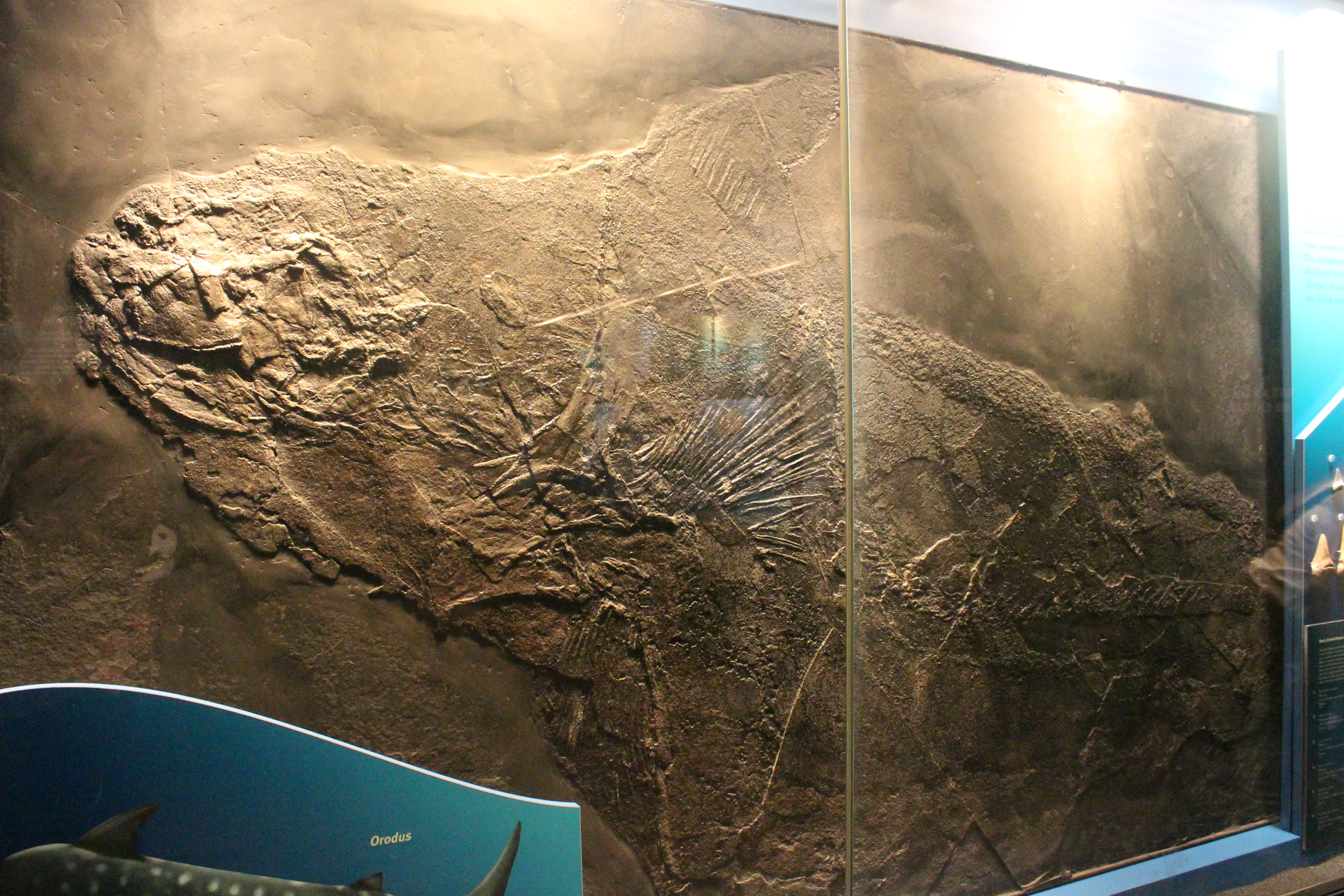
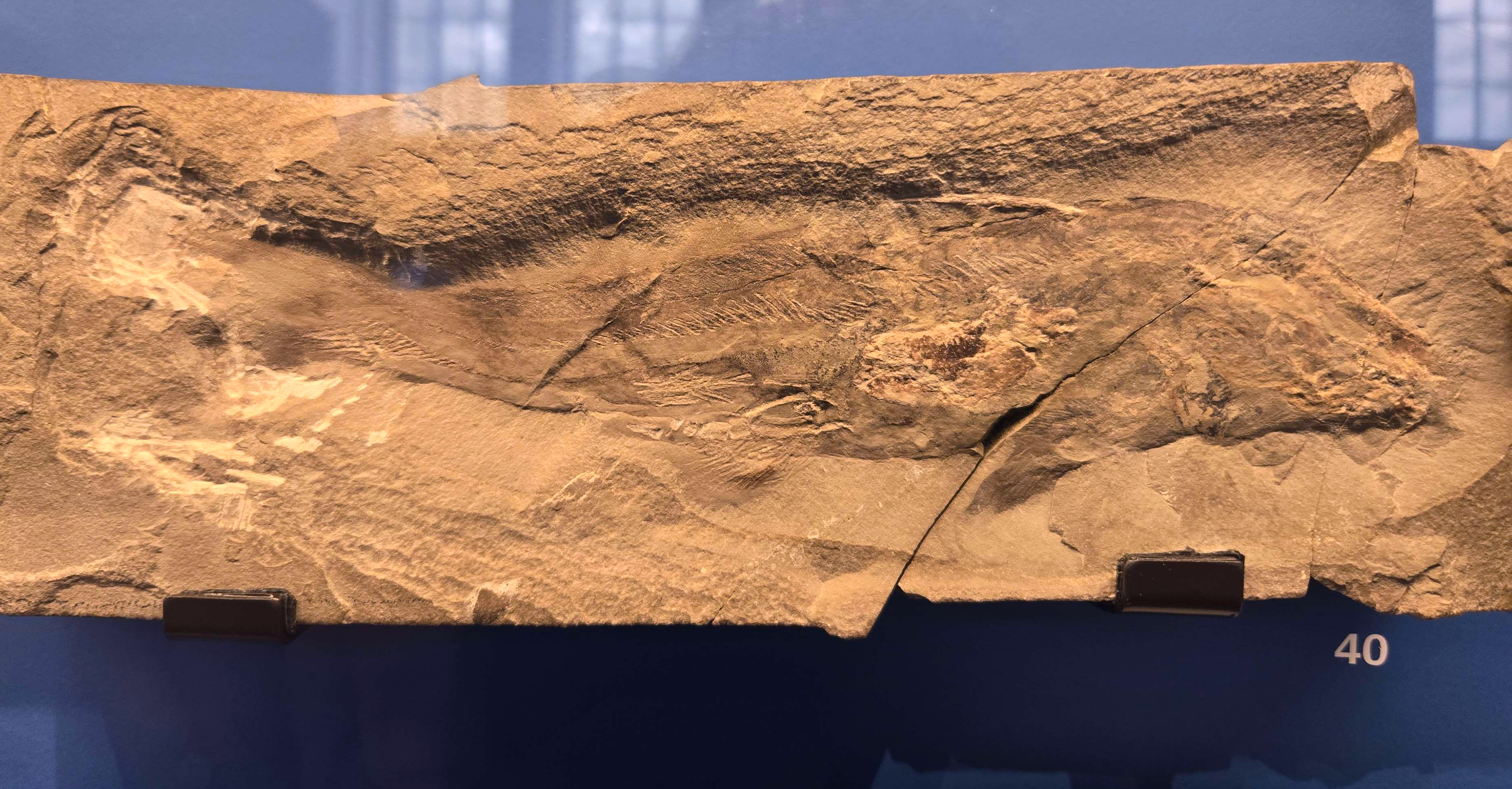
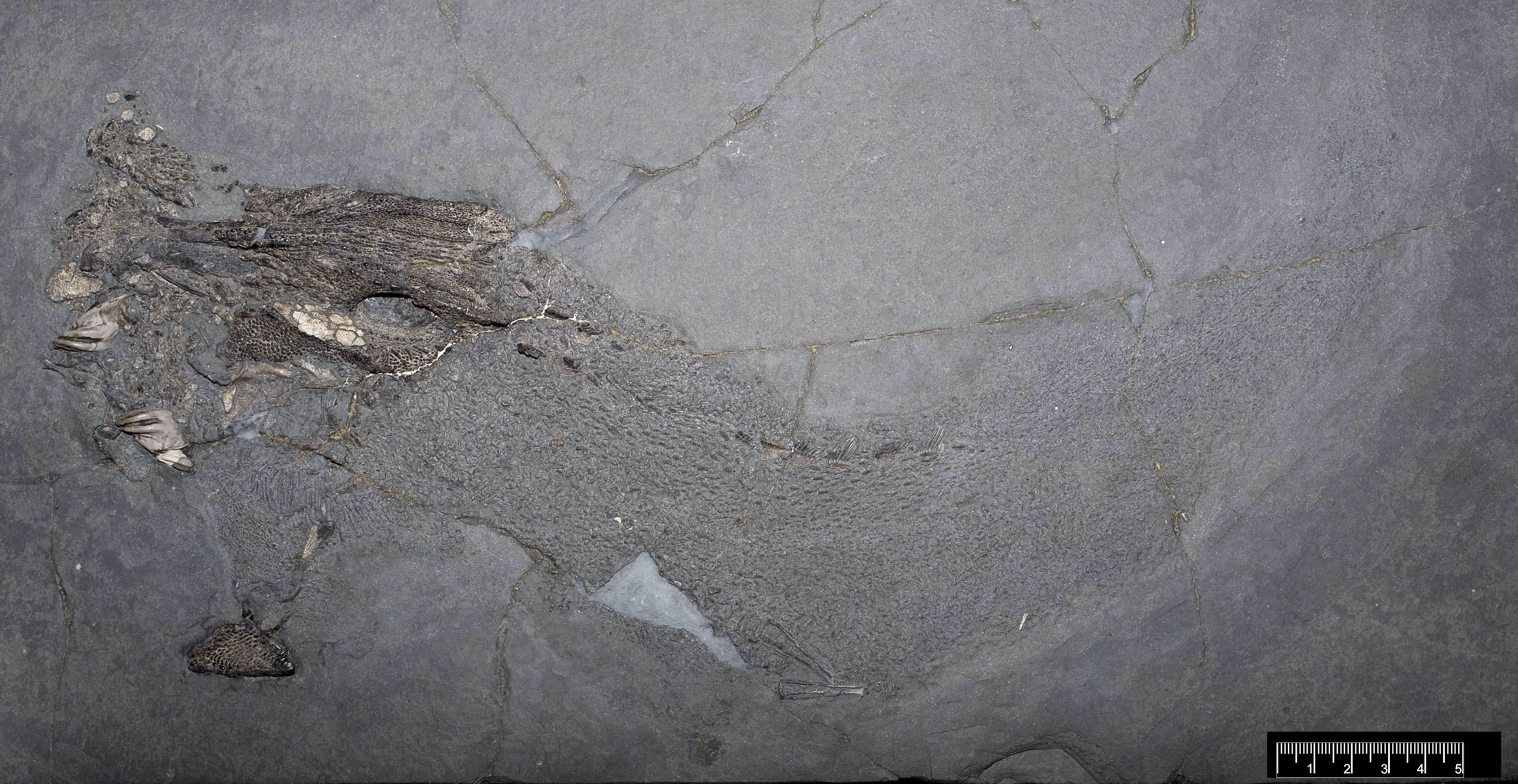
- Various holocephalans (from left to right in each row, top to bottom): Echinochimaera meltoni, Chimaera opalescens (Chimaeriformes), Belantsea montana (Petalodontiformes), Orodus greggi (Orodontiformes), Debeerius ellefseni (Debeeriiformes), and Deltoptychius armigerus (Menaspiformes)

Scientific classification
- Kingdom: Animalia
- Phylum: Chordata
- Subphylum: Vertebrata
- Infraphylum: Gnathostomata
- Clade: Eugnathostomata
- Class: Chondrichthyes
- Subclass: Holocephali; Bonaparte, 1832

Included taxa (total group)
- †Chondrenchelyiformes; †Cochliodontiformes; †Copodontiformes; †Debeeriiformes; †Eugeneodontiformes; †Helodontiformes; †Iniopterygiformes; †Menaspiformes; †Orodontiformes; †Petalodontiformes; †Psammodontiformes; Chimaeriformes; For other proposed members and classification schemes, see text

= Holocephali =

Holocephalans Temporal range: Middle Devonian (Givetian)–Present Molecular data may suggest first appearance during the Late Silurian or Early Devonian

Group of cartilaginous fish

Holocephali (sometimes spelled Holocephala; Greek for "complete head" in reference to the fusion of upper jaw with the skull) is a subclass of cartilaginous fish. The only living holocephalans (Note: The spellings "holocephalan" and "holocephalian" are both widely used to refer to members of Holocephali) are the three families of chimaeras, but the group also includes many extinct members and was more diverse during the Paleozoic and Mesozoic eras. The earliest known fossils of holocephalans date to the Middle Devonian, and the subclass likely reached its peak diversity during the following Carboniferous Period. Molecular clock studies suggest that holocephalans diverged from their closest relatives, elasmobranchs such as sharks and rays, during the Early Devonian or the Silurian Period.

Extinct holocephalans are typically divided into a number of orders, although the relationships between these groups are poorly understood. Several different definitions of Holocephali exist, with the group sometimes considered a less inclusive clade within the larger subclasses Euchondrocephali or Subterbranchialia and with its members spread into the now obsolete groups Paraselachimorpha or Bradyodonti. Per these classification schemes, the name Holocephali is used only for chimaeras and their closest relatives. Recent research has suggested that the orders Cladoselachiformes and Symmoriiformes, which were historically considered relatives or ancestors of sharks, should instead be considered holocephalans. Information on the evolution and relationships of extinct holocephalans is limited, however, because most are known only from isolated teeth or dorsal fin spines, which form much of the basis of their classification.

Chimaeras, the only surviving holocephalans, include mostly deep-sea species which are found worldwide. They all possess broad, wing-like pectoral fins, a single soft cover over the gills, upper jaws which are fused to the skull, and six plate-like crushing teeth in the mouth. Males possess both two sets of paired sex organs around the pelvic fins and an unpaired, toothed structure termed a cephalic clasper on the head. Females reproduce by laying large, leathery egg cases. The skin of living chimaeras lacks scales or armor plates, with the exception of tooth-like scales termed dermal denticles on the sensory and sex organs. Chimaeras are unique among vertebrates in that their tooth plates contain organs called tritors, which are made of the mineral whitlockite. Fossils similar to living chimaeras are known as far back as the Early Carboniferous.

While some resembled their living relatives, many extinct holocephalans had skulls and bodies which were unlike modern chimaeras. In members of extinct groups, the upper jaws were often not fused to the rest of the skull and the jaws supported rows of separate, shark-like teeth. The bodies of many extinct holocephalans were totally covered in dermal denticles, which in Paleozoic and Mesozoic members were sometimes fused into armor plates. Many extinct holocephalans were sexually dimorphic, and the males of some species possessed large grasping organs on the head. In some groups the teeth were specialized into fused, curled structures termed "tooth whorls", or arranged into flattened, crushing surfaces termed "tooth pavements". The shape of the teeth in many extinct holocephalans suggests they had a diet of shelled prey, although other species instead likely hunted softer prey like cephalopods or smaller fish. Fossils of holocephalans are most abundant in shallow marine deposits, although an extinct species is known from freshwater environments as well.

== Research history and taxonomy ==
=== Early research ===
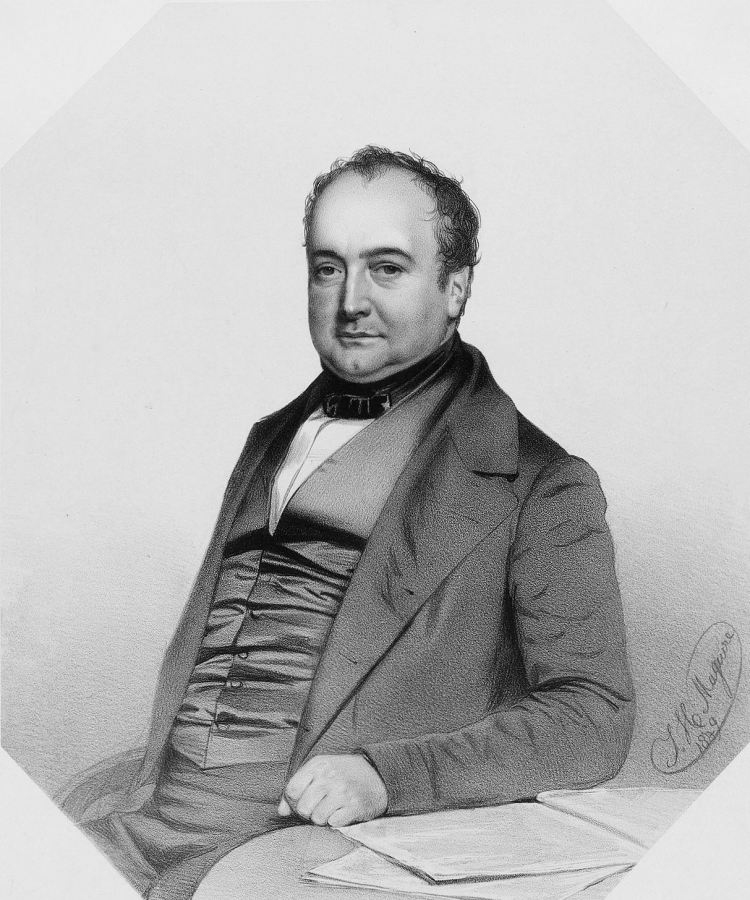
French naturalist Charles Lucien Bonaparte, who erected the order Holocephali to encompass living chimaeras

The first published use of Holocephali (then spelled "Holocephala") was by Swiss naturalist Johannes Müller in 1835, and the group was formally defined and classified by French naturalist Charles Lucien Bonaparte between 1832 and 1841. The name of the group comes from the Greek roots hólos meaning "whole" or "complete" and kephalos meaning head, and is in reference to the complete fusion of the braincase and the palatoquadrates (upper jaw) seen in chimaeras. As defined by Müller and Bonaparte, Holocephala encompassed the living genera Chimaera and Callorhinchus. Fossils of tooth plates and fin spines from the Mesozoic era were later assigned to Holocephali throughout the 1830s and 1840s. Many additional taxa were described and illustrated by the Swiss naturalist Louis Agassiz between 1833 and 1843, including a number of Paleozoic era tooth and spine genera now considered to belong to Holocephali. Both Agassiz and other influential researchers such as English biologist Richard Owen allied many Paleozoic representatives of the group with living bullhead sharks, rather than with chimaeras. By the late 1800s, researchers such as Irish zoologist Fredrick McCoy and British naturalist James William Davis questioned the relationship between these Paleozoic fossils and bullhead sharks.

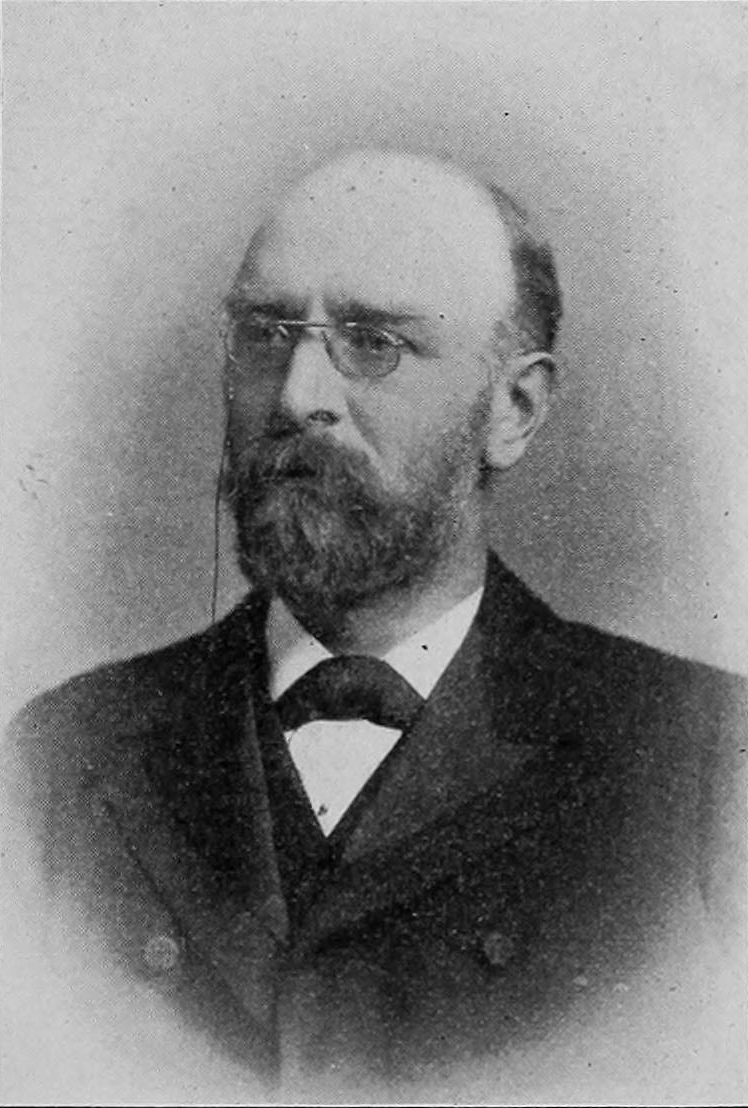
British paleontologist Arthur Smith Woodward, who allied plate-like Paleozoic fish teeth with chimaeras and who erected the order Bradyodonti

During the late 19th and early 20th century, British paleontologist Arthur Smith Woodward recognized many fossil chondrichthyans as forming a distinct taxonomic group, and in 1921 named this group Bradyodonti. Woodward considered Bradyodonti an order, although it was sometimes considered a class or subclass by later publications. He suggested that the bradyodonts were intermediate between sharks and chimaeras (then considered equivalent to Holocephali), and indicated that the latter had evolved from Paleozoic ancestors. Later work by the Danish paleontologist Egil Nielsen and British paleontologist James Alan Moy-Thomas expanded the Bradyodonti to include the Eugeneodontiformes and Orodontiformes (then the families Edestidae and Orodontidae) as well as modern chimaeras, despite these taxa's differences from the group as defined by Woodward. The broadest usage of Bradyodonti is roughly equivalent to total-group Holocephali, and its composition remains similar to Holocephali as used by modern authors.

Holocephali is treated as a subclass of the class Chondrichthyes by many modern authors (e.g. Joseph Nelson), although the group has alternatively been ranked as an order, a superorder, or as a class. When Charles Lucien Bonaparte first defined Holocephala, he considered it to be an order within the larger subclass Elasmobranchii (different from modern usage; also contained the then-order selachii). Several authors during the 20th century regarded the Holocephali as its own class within the (now obsolete) superclass Elasmobranchiomorphi, which also included the classes Selachii (or Elasmobranchii), the extinct Arthrodira (or Placodermi), and under some definitions the extinct Acanthodii. Holocephali is still sometimes considered a lower taxonomic unit within a larger subclass by some contemporary authors.

=== Recent classifications ===
The interrelationships of extinct holocephalan orders have been characterized as difficult to define and subject to change, due in part to limited data. The orders Orodontiformes, Petalodontiformes, Iniopterygiformes, Debeeriiformes, Helodontiformes and Eugeneodontiformes were formerly united under the superorder Paraselachimorpha by researcher Richard Lund. The paraselachimorphs were defined as a sister group to either the superorder Holocephalimorpha (chimaeras and their closest relatives; also coined by Lund) or, in earlier works, the similarly defined Bradyodonti. However, Paraselachimorpha is now regarded as either paraphyletic or a non-diagnostic wastebasket taxon, including by Lund himself, and the taxa which formerly made up Paraselachimorpha are now considered an evolutionary grade of early-diverging holocephalans. Likewise, the historically significant order Bradyodonti, consisting variously of taxa now placed in Petalodontiformes, Orodontiformes, Eugeneodontiformes, Helodontiformes, Menaspiformes, Cochliodontiformes, Copodontiformes, Psammodontiformes, Chondrenchelyformes, and Chimaeriformes, has also been abandoned by recent authors and is considered a paraphyletic grade.

Multiple classifications of Holocephali have been proposed by contemporary authors, which differ greatly from one another. In a 1997 paper, researchers Richard Lund and Eileen Grogan coined the subclass Euchondrocephali to refer to the total group of holocephalans (fish more closely related to living chimaeras than to living elasmobranchs). Under this classification scheme, Holocephali has a much more restricted definition and excludes the orodonts, eugeneodonts, and petalodonts, which are considered more basal euchondrocephalans or, in older works, paraselachians. Other authors have used Holocephali to include all fishes more closely related to living chimaeras than to elasmobranchs, a definition equivalent to Lund and Grogan's Euchondrocephali. Joseph S. Nelson, in his reference text Fishes of the World, opted to use the name Holocephali for a clade identical in composition to Euchondrocephali. Below is the taxonomy of total-group Holocephali as defined in the Fifth Edition of Fishes of the World (2016), which differs from earlier editions by disbanding Paraselachimorpha.

Taxonomy according to the Fifth Edition of Fishes of the World (2016)

Subclass Holocephali sensu lato (equiv. to Euchondrocephali)

- †Order Orodontiformes
- †Order Petalodontiformes
- †Order Helodontiformes
- †Order Iniopterygiformes (Alternatively considered stem-group Chondrichthyes)
- †Order Debeeriiformes
- †Order Eugeneodontiformes
- Superorder Holocephalimorpha (roughly equiv. to Holocephali sensu stricto)
  - †Order Psammodontiformes
  - †Order Copodontiformes
  - †Order Squalorajiformes (sometimes included within Chimaeriformes by other authors)
  - †Order Chondrenchelyiformes
  - †Order Menaspiformes
  - †Order Cochliodontiformes
  - Order Chimaeriformes (chimaeras)
- Incertae sedis (uncertain placement)
  - †Family Harpacanthidae
  - †Family Gregoriidae
- Nomen dubium (dubious orders)
  - †Order Desmiodontiformes

† Extinct

An alternative classification was proposed by paleontologist Rainer Zangerl in 1979, who considered Holocephali to be a superorder within the newly erected subclass Subterbranchialia (named in reference to the position of the gills relative to the skull). This group united the chimaera-like taxa, which were distinguished by their holostylic jaw suspension, with the entirely extinct iniopterygians and the Polysentoridae which possessed at least in some cases an unfused upper jaw. This classification scheme was followed in both Volume 3A of the Handbook of Paleoichthyology, authored by Zangerl, and Volume 4, authored by Barbara J. Stahl. Both of these authors considered the traditionally "bradyodont" orodonts, petalodonts, eugeneodonts and desmiodontiforms to be elasmobranchs, rather than holocephalan as generally assumed before. Later works have regarded Subterbranchialia as a potentially paraphyletic wastebasket taxon of chondrichthyans with poorly defined relationships, and others have re-included the orodonts, eugeneodonts and petalodonts within Holocephali. Zangerl's proposed classification is provided below, with differences between it and the classification used by Stahl (1999) noted.

Taxonomy according to Zangerl (1979; 1981)

Subclass Subterbranchialia

- †Order Iniopterygia (Iniopterygiformes)
- †Family Chondrenchelyidae (equiv. to Chondrenchelyiformes; alternatively placed within Holocephali by Stahl)
- †Family Polysentoridae
- Superorder Holocephali
  - †Suborder Helodontoidei (equiv. to Helodontiformes)
  - Order Bradyodontida sensu Zangerl, 1981 (Bradyodonti; disused by Stahl)
    - †Family Psammodontidae (equiv. to Psammodontiformes)
    - †Family Copodontidae (equiv. to Copodontiformes)
    - †Family Menaspidae (equiv. to Menaspiformes)
    - †Suborder Cochliodontoidei (equiv. to Cochliodontiformes)
    - Suborder Chimaeroidea (equiv. to Chimaeriformes; chimaeras)
    - †Bradyodontida incertae sedis
      - †Genus Jimpohlia

Taxa classified within subclass Elasmobranchii sensu Zangerl (1981)

- †Order Eugeneodontida or Edestiformes (Eugeneodontiformes)
- †Order Orodontida (Orodontiformes)
- †Order Petalodontida (Petalodontiformes)
- †Order Desmiodontida (Desmiodontiformes)

† Extinct

Some studies have found the shark-like symmoriiformes to be early diverging members of or relatives of Holocephali, although members of this group are traditionally considered to be either relatives of elasmobranchs or to be stem-group chondrichthyans. Symmoriiformes are sometimes regarded as the sister group to Holocephali rather than members of the subclass itself due to their differing morphology. The traditionally-recognized order Cladoselachiformes, which is sometimes included within Symmoriiformes, may also be considered holocephalan under this classification scheme. While the anatomy of the jaws and teeth differs dramatically between Symmoriiformes and typical holocephalans, they show similarities in the internal anatomy of their crania and both possess rings along their lateral lines, which may suggest a close relationship. French paleontologist Philippe Janvier first suggested a connection between the Holocephali and the Symmoriiformes (then Symmoriida) in his 1996 textbook Early Vertebrates, and the subsequent descriptions of the cladoselachian and symmoriid taxa Maghriboselache and Ferromirum, as well as the redescription of the symmoriiform Dwykaselachus have found additional support for the hypothesis. The taxonomy presented in Early Vertebrates is provided below, which considered several taxa otherwise considered holocephalan to form a polytomy with Holocephali and Elasmobranchii (iniopterygians), or sit outside of crown-group Chondrichthyes.

Taxonomy according to Early Vertebrates (1996)
Subclass Holocephali
- †Family Helodontidae (Helodontiformes)
- †Family Chondrenchelyidae (Chondrenchelyiformes)
- †Family Menaspidae (Menaspiformes)
- †Family Cochliodontidae (Cochliodontiformes)
- †Family Echinochimaeridae (Chimaeriformes)
- Suborder Chimaeroidea (Chimaeriformes)

Taxa classified as incertae sedis within crown-group Chondrichthyes, or alternatively forming a clade with Holocephali

- †Order Iniopterygia (Iniopterygiformes)
- †Order Symmoriida (Symmoriiformes; considered part of total-group Holocephali by later authors)

Taxa classified as stem-group Chondrichthyes

- †Order Petalodontida (Petalodontiformes)
- †Order Eugeneodontida (Eugeneodontiformes; also termed Edestidae sensu lato by Janvier)
- †Order Cladoselachida (Cladoselachiformes; included within Symmoriiformes by later authors)

Taxa considered too poorly known to place within Chondrichthyes

- †Order Orodontida (Orodontiformes)
- †Genus Polysentor (Polysentoridae)
- †Genus Zamponipteron (considered tentatively holocephalan and potentially associated with Pucapampella by Janvier)
- †Genus Pucapampella (considered tentatively holocephalan and potentially associated with Zamponipteron by Janvier)
- †Order Stensioellida (considered tentatively holocephalan by Janvier; alternatively considered a placoderm)
- †Order Pseudopetalichthyida (considered tentatively holocephalan by Janvier; alternatively considered a placoderm)

† Extinct

== Anatomy ==
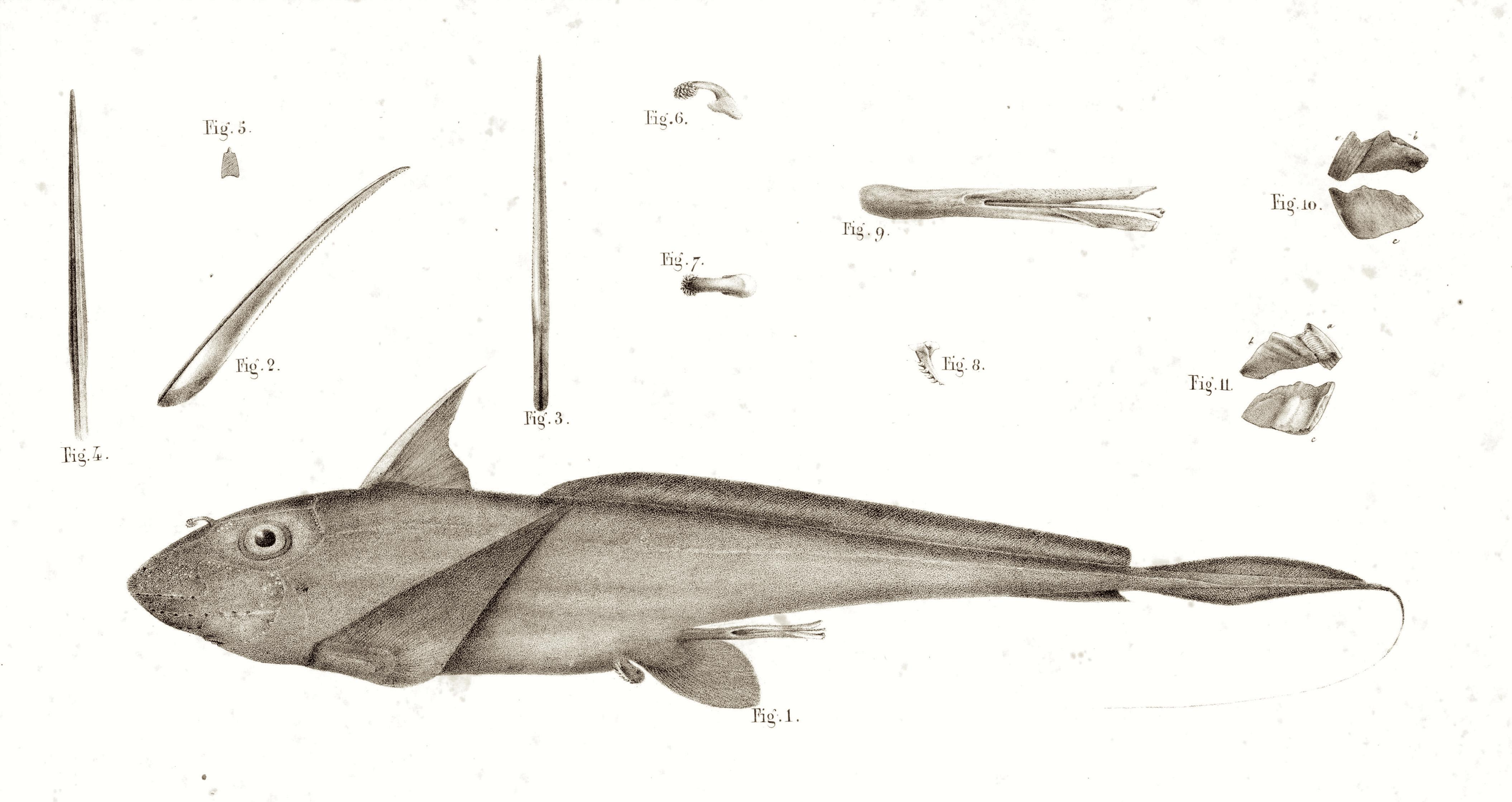
A generalized male Chimaera (fig. 1), displaying the dorsal fin spine (fig. 2-5), the cephalic clasper (fig. 6-7), pelvic claspers (fig. 9), prepelvic tenacula (fig. 10) and tooth plates (fig. 11-12)

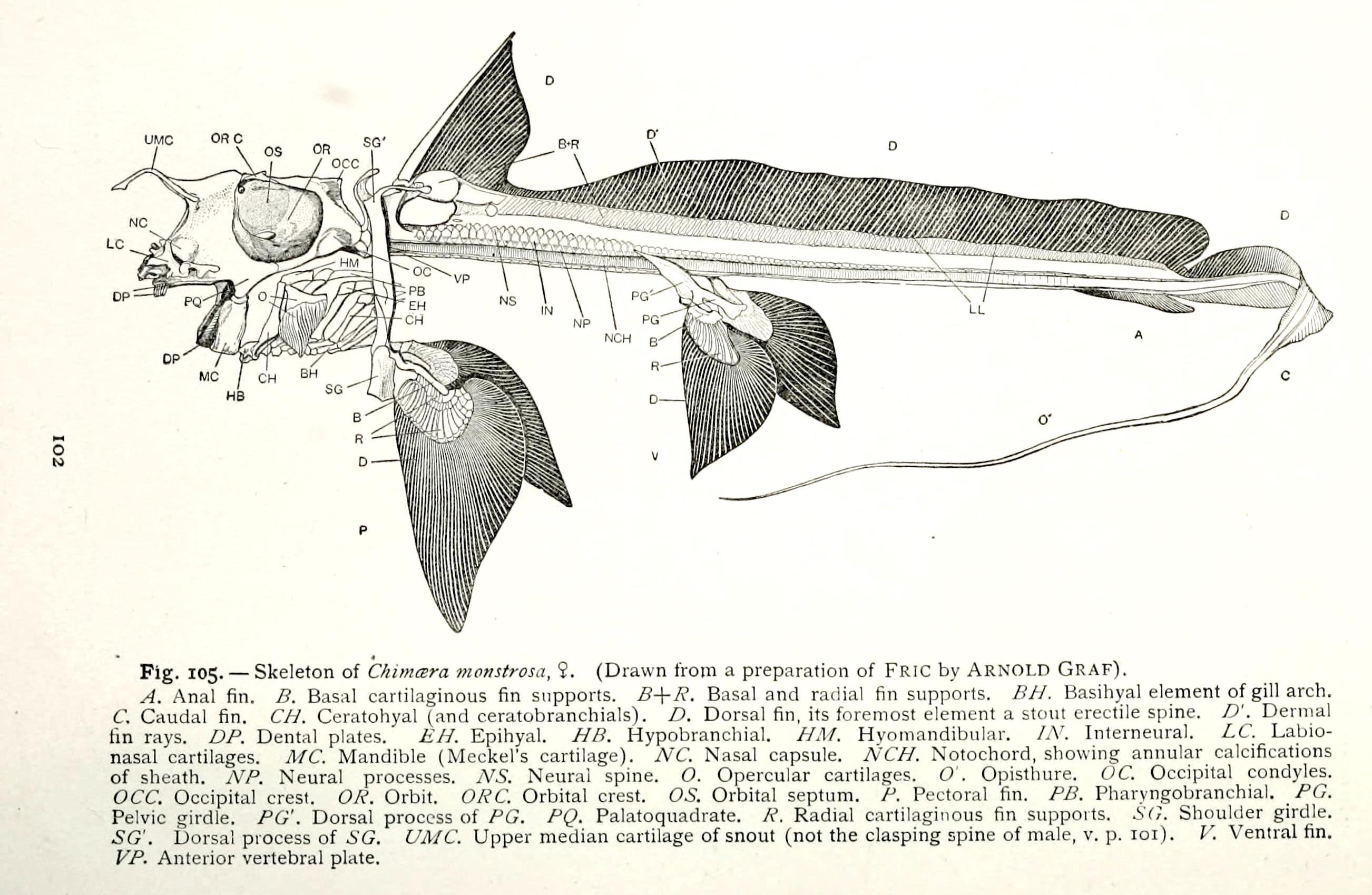
The cartilaginous skeleton of a female Chimaera, with key anatomical details labeled

=== Internal skeleton ===
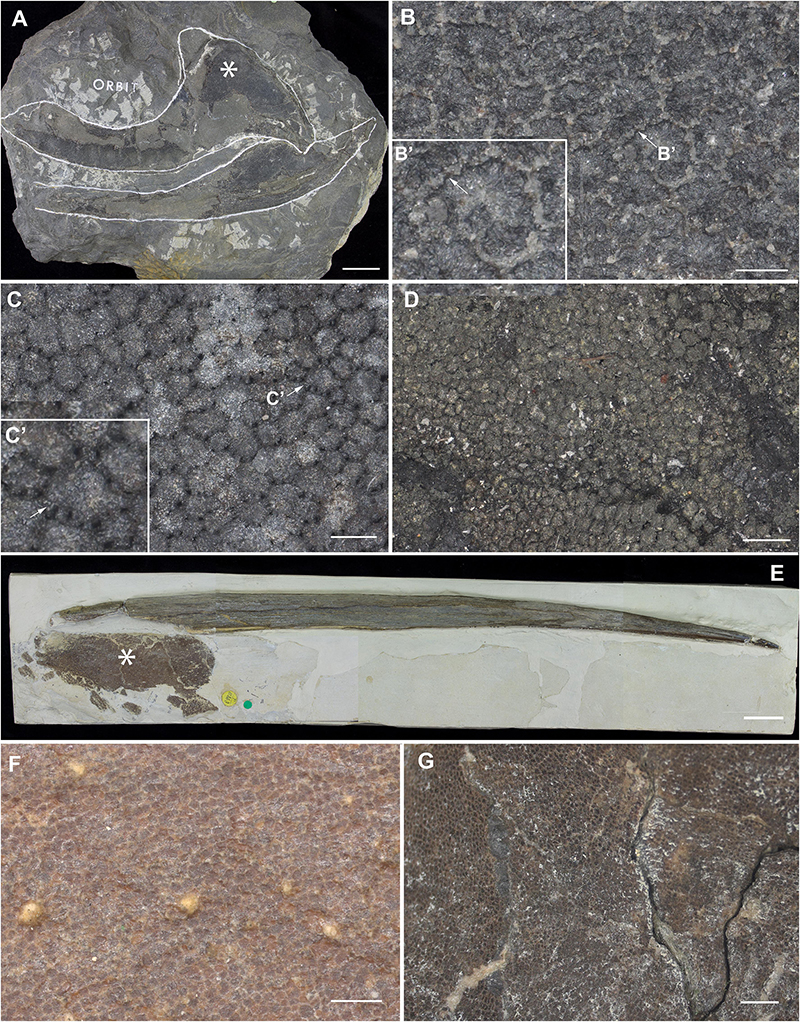
Fossilized cartilages of Cladoselache (A–C), Sibyrhynchus (D), Edaphodon (E–F), and Helodus (G), displaying mineralized tessellations

All holocephalans possess an internal skeleton made up of cartilage, which in some regions of the body is mineralized to provide additional strength. The mineralized tissues come in two forms in different regions of the skeleton; it may either form a network of tessellations or plates coating the outer surface of the underlying soft cartilage or, in certain regions such as the reproductive organs, lower jaw and vertebrae may form reinforced fibers interwoven with the cartilage termed fibrocartilage. In modern chimaeras the mineralized tessellations are irregularly shaped, smaller and less defined than in other cartilaginous fish, which has historically resulted in confusion as to whether these structures were present. In many extinct holocephalans the tessellations are large and hexagonal, and they appear more like those of sharks and rays than those of modern chimaeras. The spinal cord of holocephalans is supported by a flexible nerve cord called a notochord. In many taxa close to and within Chimaeriformes this notochord is additionally covered by a vertebral column of ossified, disk-shaped cartilaginous rings which are sometimes termed "pseudocentra" or "chordacentra", and which are different from vertebral centra in sharks and rays. The pseudocentra directly behind to the skull (cervical vertebrae) may be fused into a single unit termed a synarcual in some groups. In many Paleozoic holocephalans the vertebral rings were either unmineralized or absent, and the notochord was completely unmineralized. Dorsal (upper) and ventral (lower) processes are present along the vertebral column of holocephalans, which were typically mineralized even in early taxa without preserved vertebral rings. Like other cartilaginous fish, holocephalans lack ribs.

==== Skull, jaw and gills ====
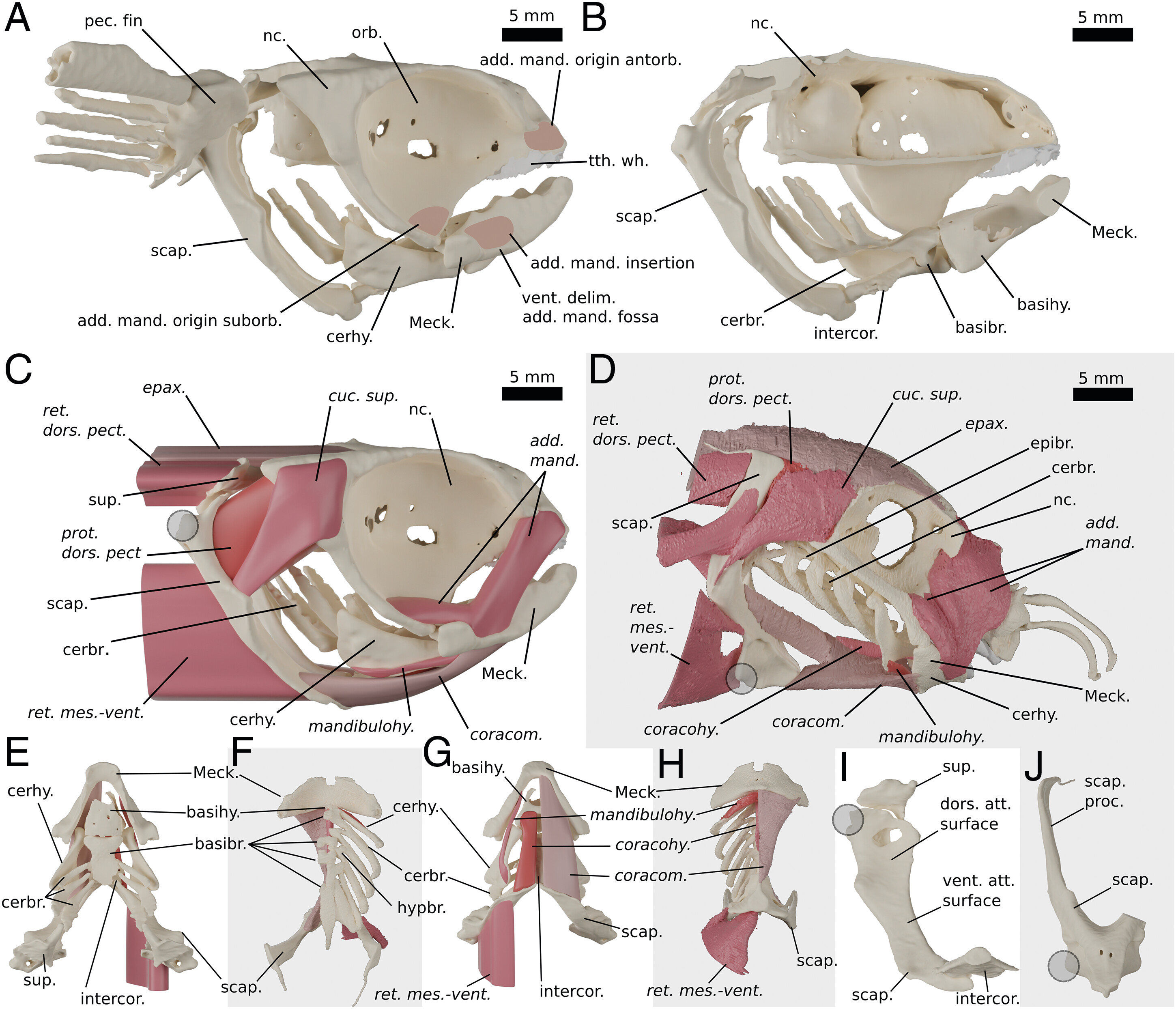
Reconstructed skull, gill and pectoral musculature of the extinct iniopterygian Iniopera (A–C, E, G, I) compared with that of the living Callorhinchus (D, F, H, J). Both genera have holostylic jaws

The jaw suspension of modern chimaeras and many of their extinct relatives is holostylic (sometimes termed autostylic), meaning that the upper jaws (palatoquadrates) are entirely fused to the skull (neurocranium or chondrocranium) and only the lower jaws (Meckel's cartilages) are able to articulate. Holostyly has been proposed to have evolved independently in several extinct holocephalan groups due to a similar lifestyle. The ancestral mode of jaw suspension among holocephalans has been termed autodiastyly (alternatively termed unfused holostyly), meaning that the upper jaws are not fully fused to the cranium and instead articulate at two points, rendering them inflexible but still separated from the cranium. A number of early holocephalan groups exhibit autodiastyly, and embryonic chimaeras show the condition at early stages of development. Other forms of jaw suspension, termed hyostyly and amphistyly, are present in modern elasmobranchs and in some potential holocephalan groups. In hyostilic and amphistylic jaw suspension, the upper jaws are disconnected from the cranium. Hyostylic and amphistylic jaws are supported by soft tissue, as well as by a modified pharyngeal arch termed the hyoid arch or hyomandibula.

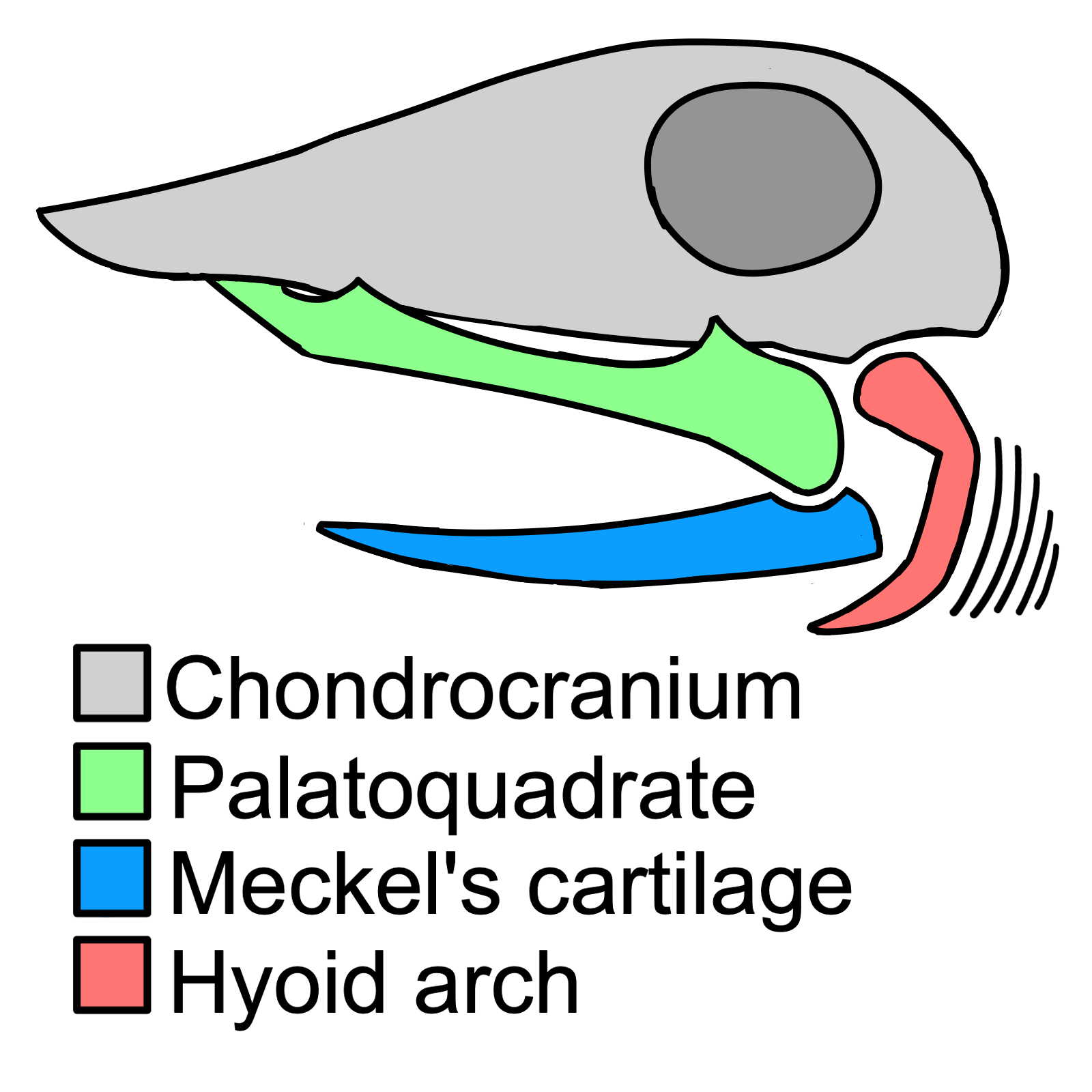
Diagram of autodiastylic jaw suspension, applied to a hypothetical early holocephalan

In holostylic and autodiastylic holocephalans, the hyoid arch is retained but is not utilized in jaw suspension. Instead, the arch is positioned behind the skull and supports a soft, fleshy gill cover (operculum) which is reinforced by cartilaginous rays. This soft operculum is considered a characteristic feature of the Holocephali, although it is debated whether it was present in some early members of the subclass (e.g. Eugeneodontiformes) or if they had separate gill slits like elasmobranchs. Holocephalans typically possess five gill arches, although eugeneodonts may have had a small, vestigial sixth gill arch. The gill arches of iniopterygians, petalodonts and holocephalimorphs are tightly packed and positioned beneath the skull. Living chimaeras and the extinct Helodus possess two otoliths (inner ear elements).

==== Fins ====
The fins of holocephalans may include paired pectoral and pelvic fins, either one or two dorsal fins, a caudal (tail) fin, and in certain members a small anal fin. The fins are skeletally supported by cartilaginous blocks and rods called basal and radial pterygiophores, and by thin rays called ceratotrichia. The caudal fin of many holocephalans is heterocercal with a long upper lobe, although in some groups it is leptocercal (also called diphycercal) meaning it is symmetrical and elongated, and in modern chimaeras may also end in a long, whip-like filament. In chimaeras the first dorsal fin is retractable, and is additionally supported by a large fin spine and the synarcuum (cervical vertebrae). The paired fins are supported by the pectoral girdles (scapulocoracoids) and pelvic girdles, respectively. The pectoral girdles are fused along their ventral (lower) point of contact in modern chimaeras but unfused in earlier holocephalans. Some fins may be reduced or absent in specific holocephalan groups, or extremely large and specialized in others. Groups such as the iniopterygians, petalodonts and chimaeras have small, underdeveloped caudal fins and very large, wing-like pectoral fins. In the Chondrenchelyiformes and some orodonts all fins were very small and the body shape was eel-like (anguilliform). Members of the Eugeneodontiformes lacked second dorsal fins and anal fins, as well as potentially pelvic fins, and had fusiform, streamlined bodies.

=== Teeth ===
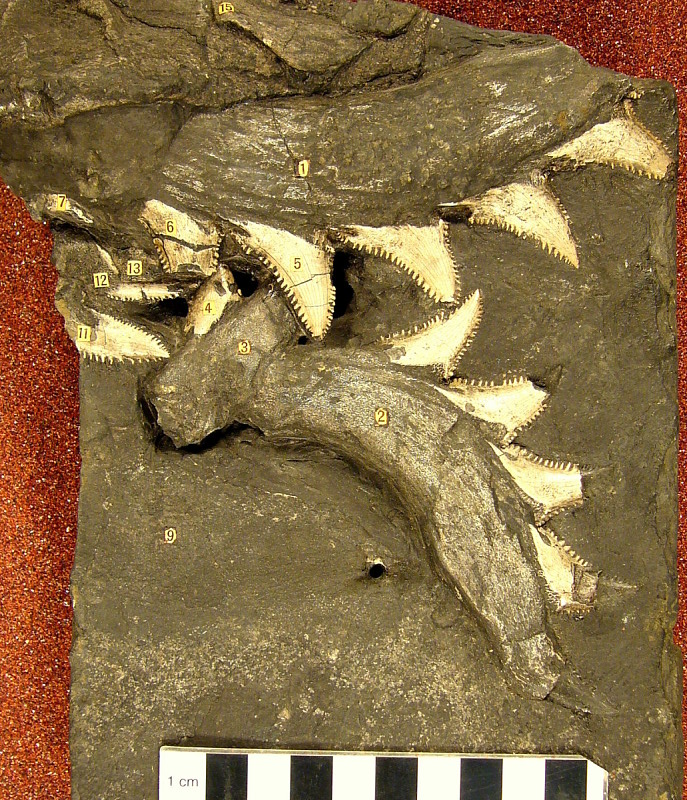
The jaws and tooth whorls of Edestus, a member of the Eugeneodontiformes

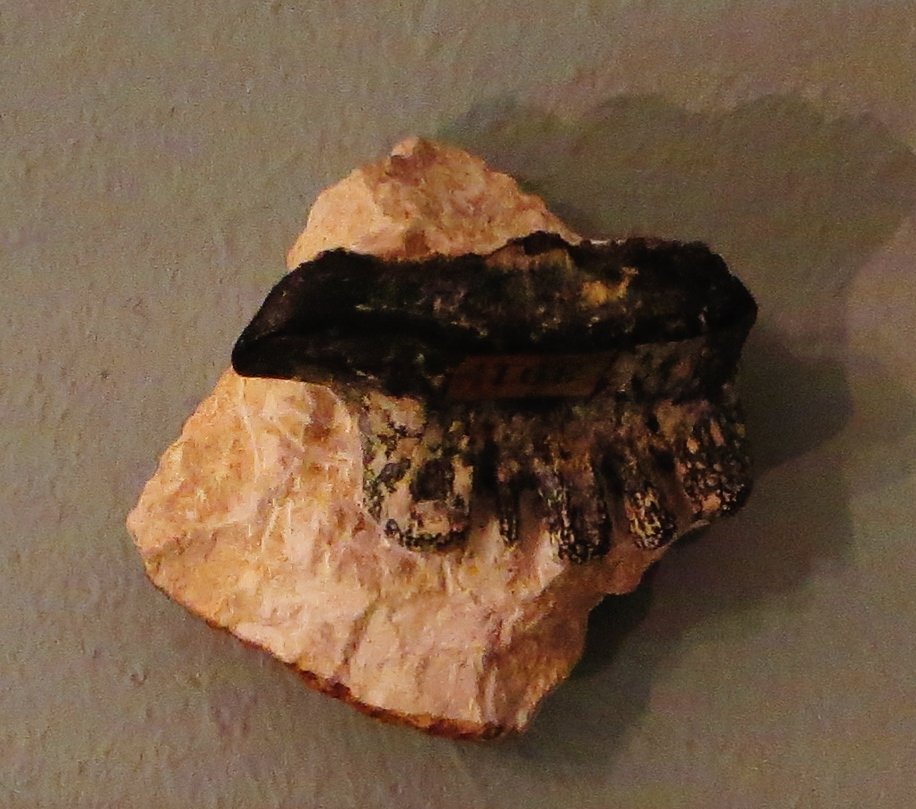
A comb-like tooth from Polyrhizodus, a member of the Petalodontiformes

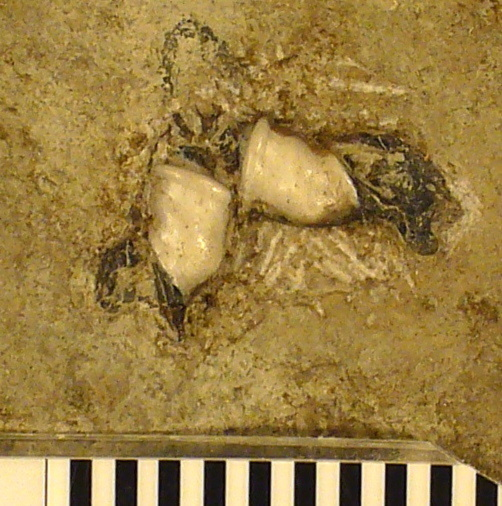
The lower tooth plates and mandible of Poecilodus, a member of the Cochliodontiformes

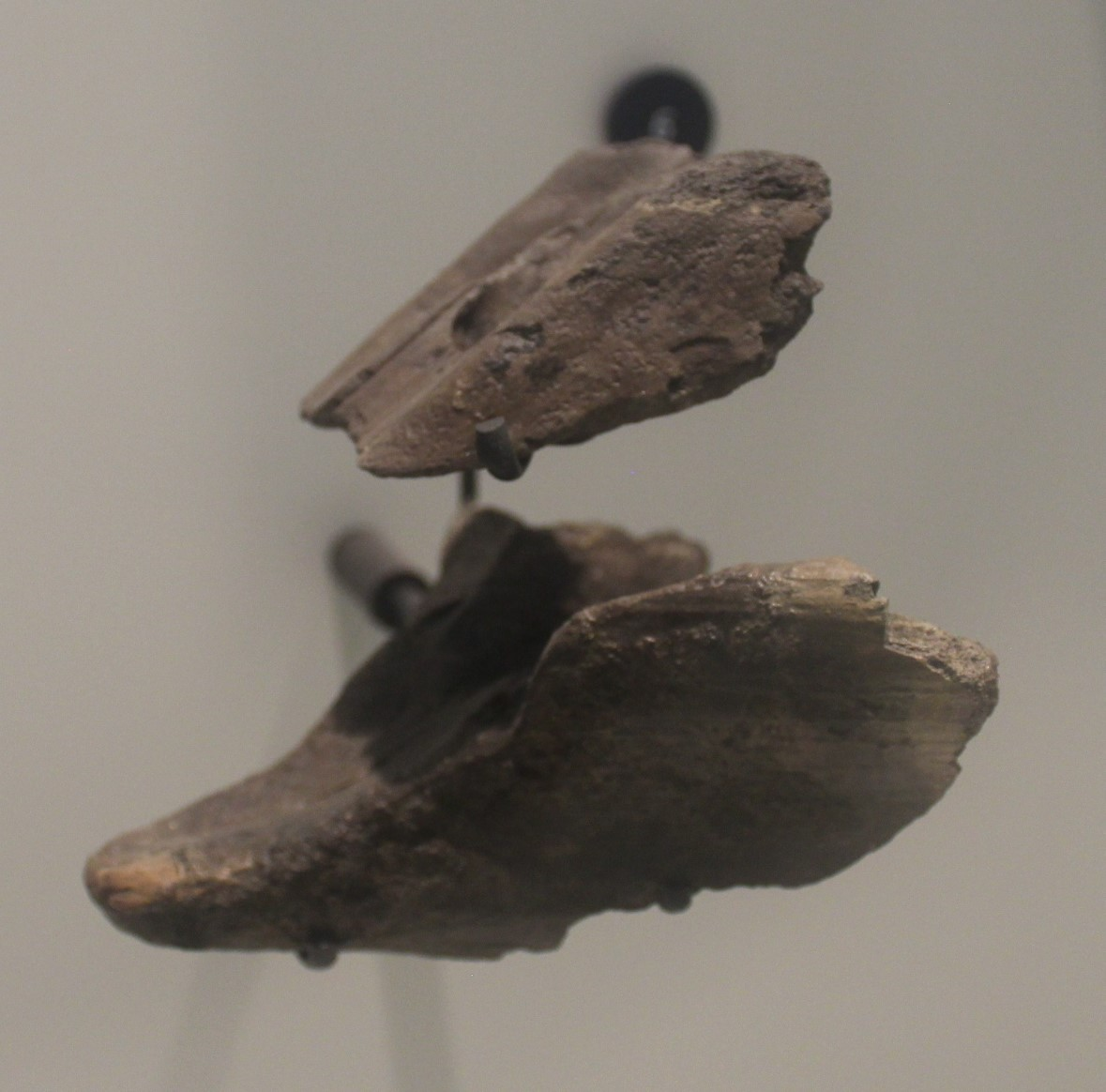
The upper and lower tooth plates of Edaphodon, a member of the Chimaeriformes

The holocephalan fossil record consists almost entirely of isolated tooth plates, and these form the basis of study for extinct members. The teeth of holocephalans are made up of a crown and a base (sometimes called a root), the anatomies of which vary greatly depending on the specific order. The subclass is often characterized by teeth which grow slowly and are either shed infrequently or are retained throughout life and are never shed (sometimes termed statodonty), although this may not apply to all included members. In many holocephalans the teeth are strongly heterodont, meaning that their morphology varies in different regions of the mouth and different groups of teeth (termed tooth families) are specialized for different purposes. In most members of the subclass tooth families are arranged into those at the anterior (front), middle and posterior (rear) of the jaws. When applicable the teeth may be further classified as paired, lateral teeth along the margins of the jaws, unpaired symphyseal teeth along the midline, and in some cases paired, parasymphyseal teeth near the midline axis of the jaw. In some groups the bases of some teeth are fused into connected structures called tooth whorls. The dentition may also consists of flat, unfused, plate-like teeth in tight-fitting rows, a configuration termed a "tooth pavement" with specific elements termed "pavement teeth". Some derived members possessed only a tooth pavement made up of a few large, specialized plates, while others had pavements in the rear of the mouth and syphyseal tooth whorls at the front.

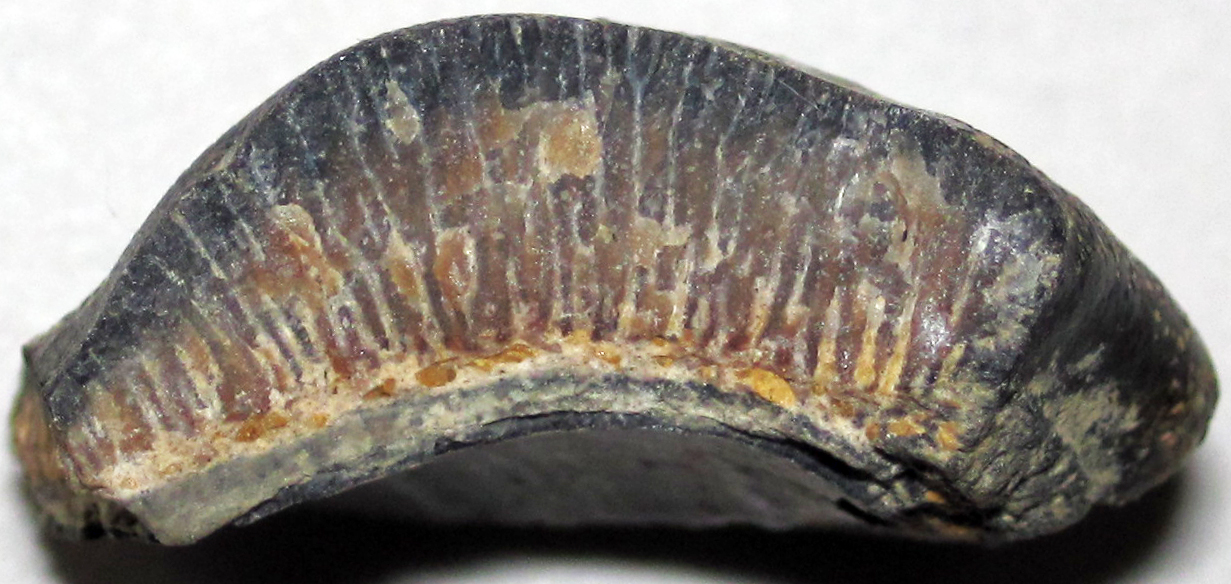
Cross-section of a fossilized Helodus tooth plate, which had tubular or tubate dentin

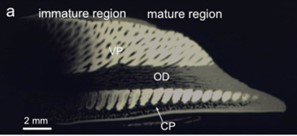
Longitudinal section of a Chimaera phantasma tooth plate, showing trabecular dentin (or osteodontin; OD) and whitlockite-based whitlockin (or tubular dentin, pleromin; VP, CP)

Holocephalan teeth are made up of dentin, which in holocephalans is divided into three main forms. The anatomical terminology used to describe histology and arrangement of holocephalan dentin is inconsistent, and the same forms have been given different names by different authors. Most of the tooth consists of softer, vascularized trabecular dentin (in a form referred to by some authors as osteodentin due to its resemblance to bone), with a thin outer layer of stronger enameloid (also called vitrodentin or pallial dentin) that is typically missing due to wear or abrasion. An organization of dentin called tubular dentin (alternatively tubate dentin) is present in the dentitions of most holocephalans, which is a form arranged in vertical tubules and reinforced by additional minerals. In chimaeras these tubules are made up of the unique, hypermineralized tissue whitlockin (also called kosmin, cosmine, or pleromin) which is composed of the mineral whitlockite rather than apatite which makes up the rest of the tooth plate (and the entirety of the teeth in other vertebrates). This is the only known example of whitlockite being naturally used in animal teeth instead of apatite, and it gives these regions of the tooth plates extreme strength. Earlier holocephalan teeth lack whitlockin, and their tubules instead consist of an enameloid-like tissue sometimes termed orthotrabeculine. The roots or bases of holocephalan teeth contain lamellar tissues, and are vascularized and contain blood vessels.

==== Eugeneodonts, orodonts and petalodonts ====
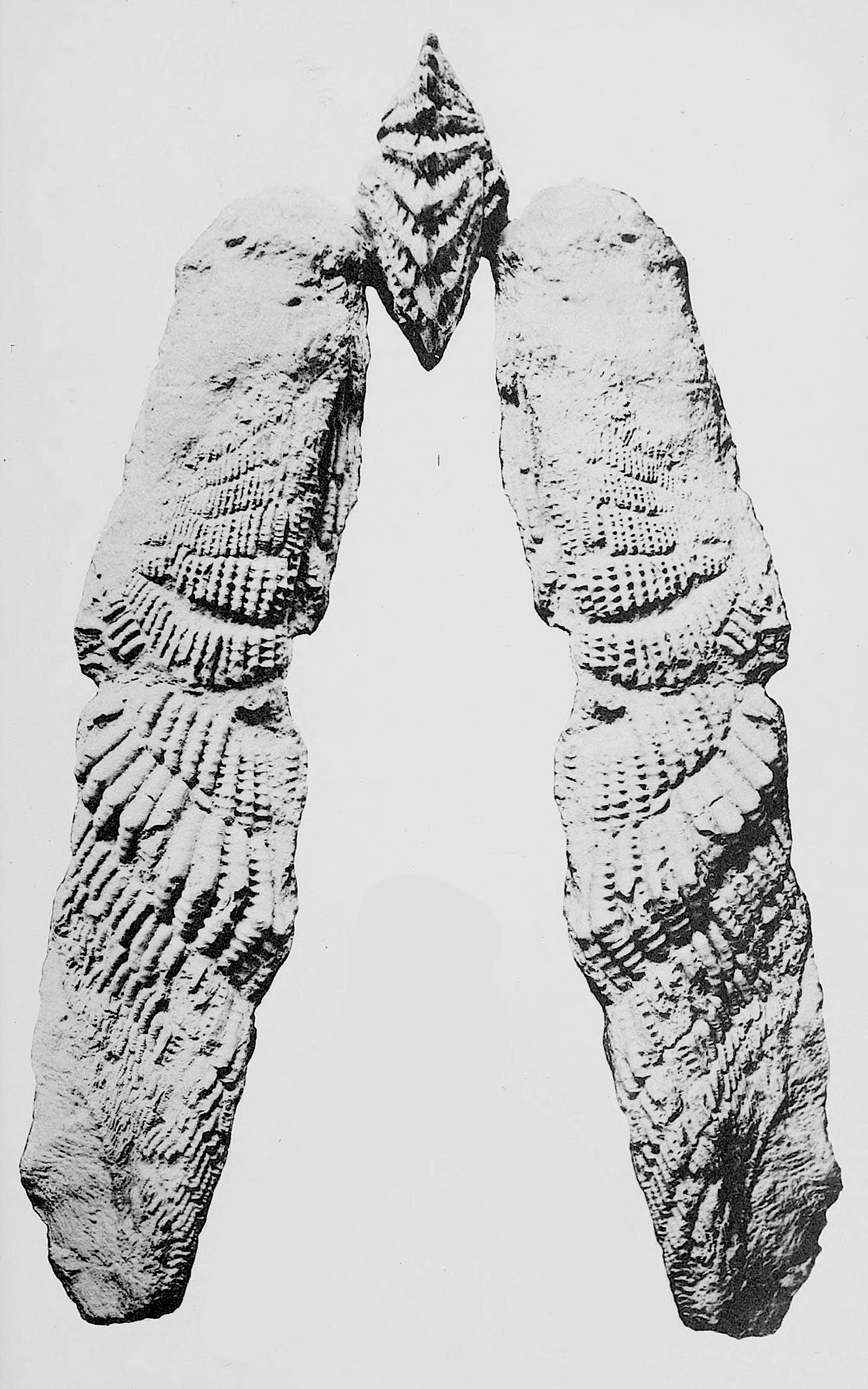
The reconstructed jaws and teeth of an unnamed eugeneodont (formerly Campodus or Agassizodus), with a symphyseal tooth whorl in the anterior region of the jaw and a lateral tooth pavement in the posterior region

Eugeneodonts and orodonts both possessed a symphyseal tooth row along the midline of the lower jaw and rows of pavement teeth lining the lateral regions of the mouth, and some eugeneodonts also had an additional row of symphyseal teeth on the upper jaw. The eugeneodonts are known primarily from their tooth whorls, which in some species were extremely large, had fused tooth roots that prevented teeth from shedding, and formed logarithmic spirals. Orodont teeth were less specialized, and the pavement teeth were very similar to those of eugeneodonts, the teeth of early elasmobranchs such as hybodonts, and the tooth plates of cochliodonts and helodonts. Orodontiformes is sometimes considered a polyphyletic (unnatural) grouping of early holocephalans with similar tooth morphology, rather than a true clade.

The tooth structure of the petalodonts was extremely diverse, but few members are known from more than isolated teeth and the classification of many taxa is uncertain. In those with complete dentitions known, most are heterodont (tooth shape varies) while others are homodont (teeth are essentially identical). Petalodont teeth are generally thought to fall into four morphologies: Petalodus-type (incisor-like), Ctenoptychius-type (multi-cusped), Fissodus-type (bifurcated) and Janassa-type (molar-like), multiple of which may have been present in the mouth of a single species. In the homodont taxon Janassa bituminosa there were many rows of teeth in the mouth which were retained throughout the animal's life and formed a "platform" for new teeth to grow onto. The teeth of Debeeriiformes (and the dubious Desmiodontiformes) were similar in morphology to Petalodontiformes and also displayed heterodonty, although they differed in histology and arrangement.

==== Holocephalimorphs and Helodus ====
The Holocephalimorpha is a clade which unites the holostylic holocephalans and many taxa with similar tooth plates. Many Holocephalimorphs, such as the Cochliodontiformes, Psammodontiformes and Copodontiformes are known primarily or exclusively from their flattened tooth plates, which in cochliodonts such as Cochliodus grew in a distinctive spiral. Better known holocephalimorphs such as Chondrenchelys had a set of large, crushing, flattened tooth plates attached to the jaws, as well as a set of extra-oral (separate from the jaw) petalodont-like tooth plates in the anterior region of the mouth which may have been attached to the labial (lip) cartilage. The teeth of the genus Helodus, the sole member of the order Helodontiformes, are sometimes considered transitional between those of orodont-like (particularly eugeneodont) fishes and the holocephalimorphs, and consist of both rows of separate pavement teeth and teeth fused into fused tooth whorls. Historically the whorls of Helodus were given the genus name Pleuroplax, but they are now known in articulated specimens alongside the separate teeth. In isolation, the unfused teeth of Helodus are similar to those seen in other groups of holocephalan, and this genus has historically been used as a wastebasket taxon for bead-like holocephalan teeth.

==== Chimaeras ====
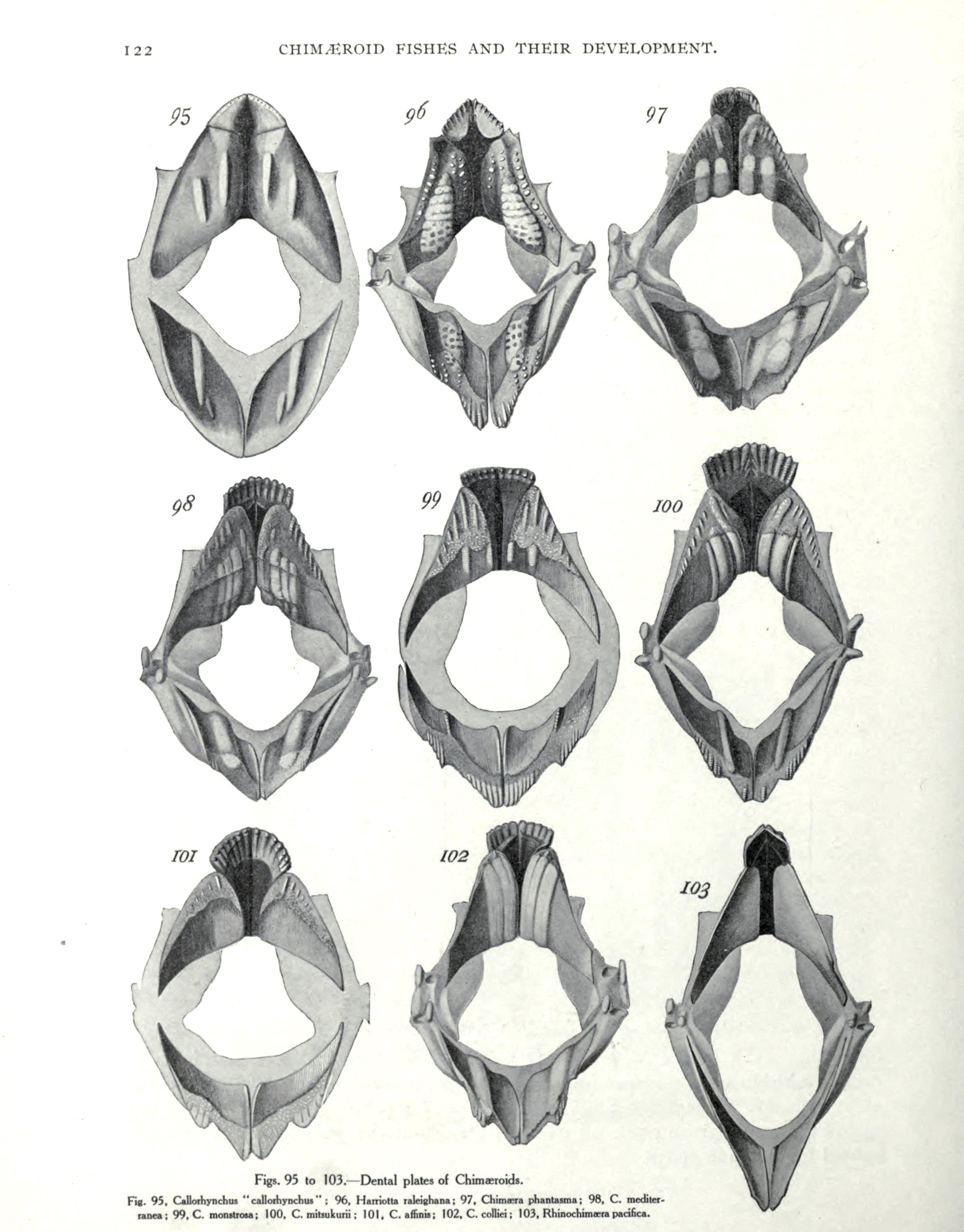
Tooth plates of a selection of modern chimaeras

Modern chimaeras and their closest fossil relatives have only three pairs of highly specialized tooth plates, which are derived from fused tooth families and consist of two pairs in the upper jaw and a single pair in the lower jaw. The teeth of chimaeras have specialized structures called tritors which are composed of whitlockite, which take the shape of both tubules and rounded structures called ovids within the matrix of the tooth, and pads on the surface of the tooth. The arrangement of the tritors is a distinguishing characteristic of different chimaera species. The upper frontmost tooth plates are incisor-like and protrude from the mouth, giving the mouth a beak-like or rodent-like appearance. In recent works, the frontmost upper teeth are referred to as vomerine plates, the rear upper crushing plates as palatine (or palatal) plates, and the single pair of lower teeth are referred to as the mandibular plates.

==== Iniopterygians and Symmoriiformes ====
The tooth morphology of the iniopterygians differs wildly from that of any other proposed holocephalans, and more closely resembled the dentition of elasmobranchs in histology. Iniopterygian teeth consisted of multiple fused tooth whorls with sharp cusps, arranged symphyseally or parasymphyseally, which were movable and articulated. Some also possessed flattened plates within the mouth, termed buccal plates, which were distinct from the tooth plates of other holocephalans. The jaws of iniopterygians were also lined with small, sharp denticles. The teeth of the possibly holocephalan Symmoriiformes (and the sometimes included Cladoselachiformes) were cladodont (three-cusped), and grew and were replaced in a manner similar to those of sharks, albeit at a slower rate than in modern sharks.

=== Skin and external skeleton ===
In adult modern chimaeras, scales are present along the lateral line and, in males, on the reproductive organs, while most of the body is covered in smooth, scaleless skin. Embryonic and juvenile chimaeras do possess additional scales along their backs, which also last into adulthood in Callorhinchus. Conversely, Paleozoic and Mesozoic chimaeriforms such as Squaloraja and Echinochimaera, as well as members of other extinct orders, have scales covering the entire body throughout life. The scales of holocephalans are placoid (also termed dermal denticles), meaning they contain a pulp cavity, are made up primarily of orthodentin and are coated in an outer layer of hard enameloid. In extinct holocephalans the scales may be either single-cusped (termed lepidomoria) or multi-cusped (termed polyodontode scales), the latter meaning the scales have multiple crowns growing from a single base. Some holocephalans had armor plates made up of dentin, as well as dentinous spines which protruded from the top of the head, the lower jaw, or the first dorsal fin. Armor plating gradually reduced during the evolution of the Chimaeriformes, and modern chimaeras lack any armor and retain only a dorsal fin spine, which in at least some species is venomous.

==== Sensory organs ====
Both modern and fossil holocephalans possess sensory canals on their heads and down the length of the body. The precise arrangement of these canals in extinct members of the group is difficult to determine, although they are well-documented in taxa such as Menaspis, Deltoptychius, Harpagofututor, and a number of extinct chimaeriforms. Some holocephalans display a distinctive arrangement of ring-shaped structures enclosing the lateral line, which is considered a unique feature of the group.

=== Reproduction ===
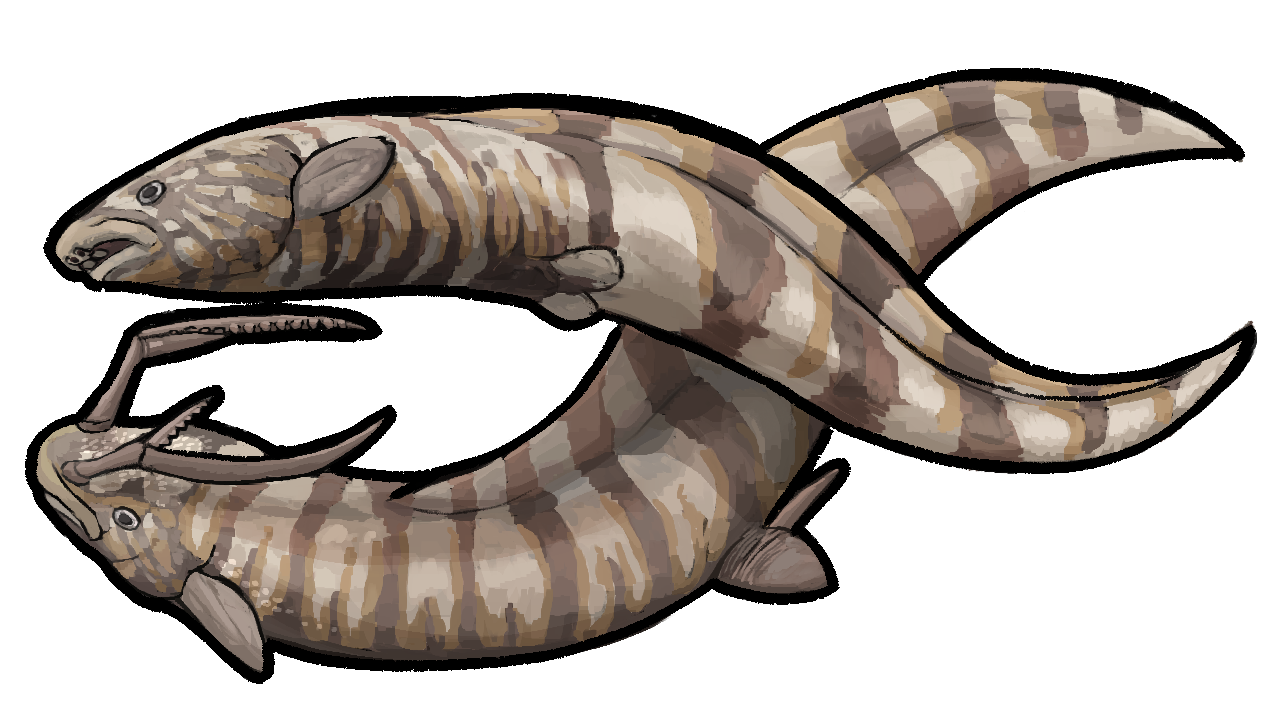
Males of the chondrenchelyiform Harpagofututor (below) possessed both paired pelvic claspers and paired, antler-like cephalic claspers, both of which are absent in females (above)

Holocephalans are typically sexually dimorphic. Males may possess up to three forms of external reproductive organs: paired pelvic claspers used for the transfer of sperm like those of other cartilaginous fish, paired prepelvic tenaculae, and paired or unpaired frontal or cephalic claspers. In certain Paleozoic species, additional paired spines are sometimes present on the heads of males, and while some authors in the past have considered these structures homologous to cephalic claspers, they are now considered distinct due to their differing histology. Unlike other cartilaginous fish, chimaeras lack a cloaca and instead possess separate anal and urogenital openings.

==== Clasping organs ====
In modern chimaera males, the cephalic clasper (also called the cephalic tenaculum) is a tooth-bearing, unpaired cartilaginous structure on the top of the head that is used to grab females during mating. The clasper has been hypothesized to be derived from the upper jaw, and is equipped with whorls of hook-like teeth that vary in morphology between species and which are similar to the teeth of sharks. It can be flexed and retracted into a pocket on the head. In some extinct holocephalans such as Helodus simplex, myriacanthoids, Psammodus and Traquairius nudus the males possessed extremely long cephalic claspers, which in some taxa are as long as the skull and rostrum. Similar, albeit paired structures are present in the genera Harpagofututor and Harpacanthus, which likely served a similar grabbing purpose. The presence or absence of these structures varies even among closely related taxa, and it is thought that cephalic claspers have appeared separately in multiple holocephalan groups.

In chimaeras and some related groups the males also possess prepelvic tenaculae. These are paired, skeletally supported, retractable structures that protrude in front of the pelvic fins and are used during mating. In chimaeras these are covered in tooth-like denticles. Similar, hook-like organs (termed tenacular hooks) are known in some iniopterygian males, but these are convergently evolved and not homologous to those in chimaeras.

==== Eggs and development ====
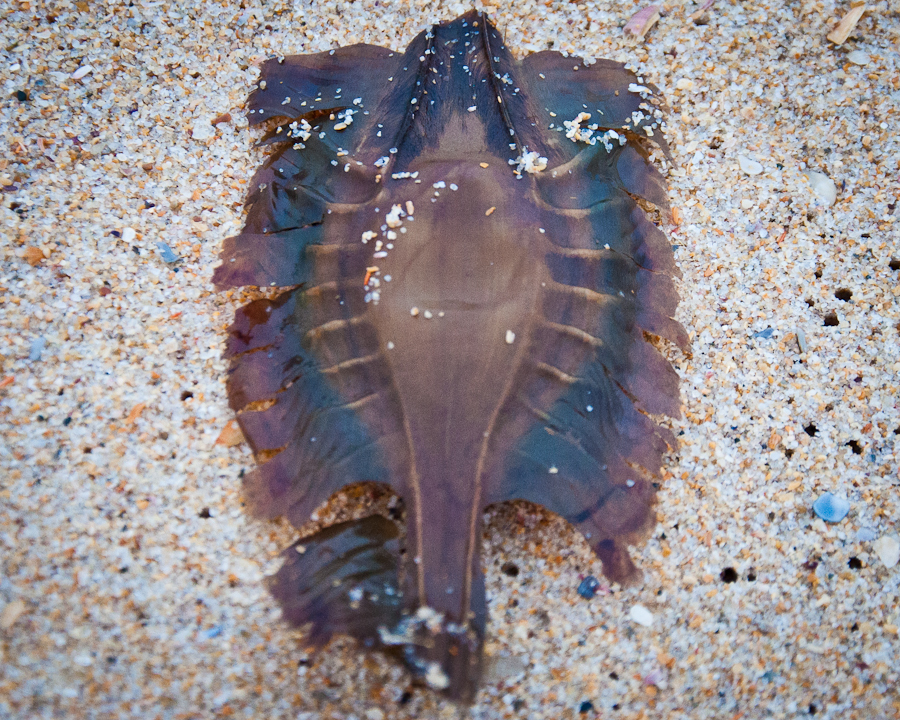
Egg case of the extant Cape elephantfish (Callorhinchus capensis)

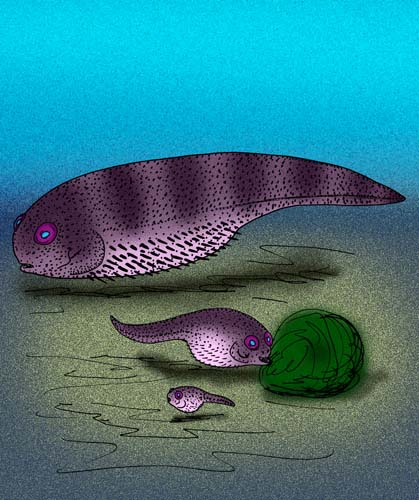
Life reconstruction of newborn Delphyodontos dacriformes, which may have been a live-bearing holocephalan

All living chimaeras reproduce by egg-laying (oviparity). The egg cases of both living chimaeras and their close fossil relatives are proportionally large and composed of collagen, and in living chimaeras are laid two at a time. Chimaera egg cases are characterized by an elongated, fusiform shape and a striated flap, termed a flange or collarette, that protrudes from their outer rim. The egg anatomy is unique in each family of chimaeras, allowing for isolated fossilized eggs to be identified to the family level. Egg cases similar to those of living chimaeras, which are assigned to the oogenera Crookallia and Vetacapsula, are known from the Late Carboniferous (Pennsylvanian) and may have been laid by helodonts. Because of the rarity of egg capsules and presence of isolated fossilized fetuses from the Early Carboniferous (Mississippian) Bear Gulch Limestone fossil site, it is possible that many early holocephalan groups may have been live-bearing (viviparous or ovoviviparous) rather than egg-laying, although it is also that possible that egg cases from many species simply happen to not have been preserved.

Young juvenile holocephalans have very weakly calcified skeletons and are poorly represented in the fossil record. Fossils of fetal or newborn Delphyodontos, which may have been an early holocephalan, are an exception, as these have uniquely calcified skulls and sharp, hook-like teeth. Based on its anatomy and coprolites (fossilized feces), Delphyodontos may have engaged in intrauterine cannibalism and was live-born (viviparous). The chondrenchelyiform Harpagofututor gave birth to extremely large young, which besides their uncalcified skeletons were well-developed and likely matured quickly. Female Harpagofututor are known to have contained up to five fetuses from multiple litters, and unlike Delphyodontos it is considered unlikely the fetuses engaged in cannibalism. Instead, it is probable fetal Harpagofututor were fed either by unfertilized eggs (oophagy) or mucus within the uterus (histophagy).

== Evolution ==
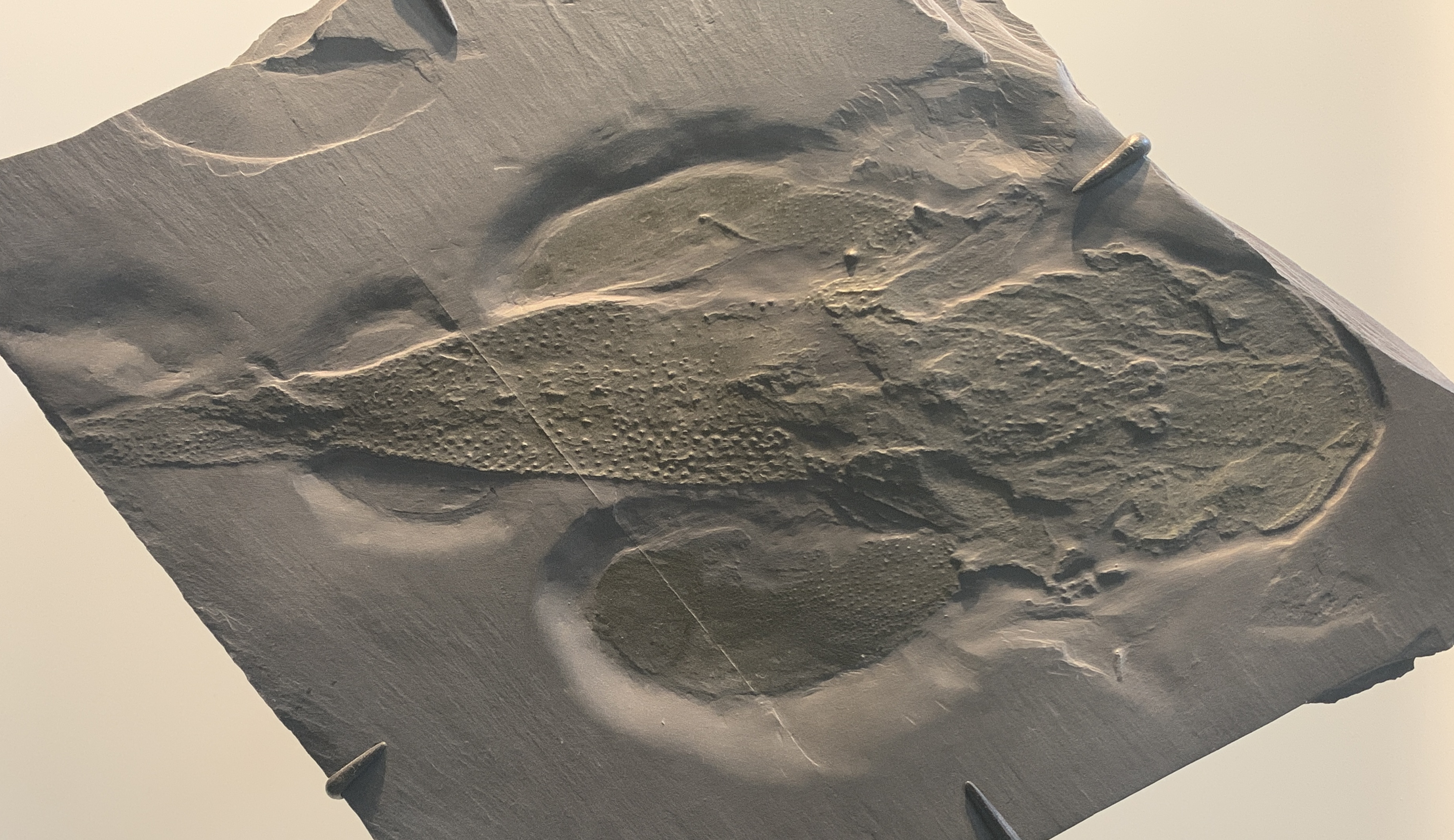
Stensioella hertzi has sometimes been considered the earliest-known holocephalan. It is alternatively believed to be an early placoderm of indeterminate placement

While the holocephalan fossil record is extensive, most of these fossils consist only of teeth or isolated fin spines, and the few complete specimens that are known are often poorly preserved and difficult to interpret. The enigmatic, scaled fishes Stensioella, Pseudopetalichthys and Paraplesiobatis, which are all known from poorly-preserved body fossils from the Early Devonian of Germany, have been proposed by researcher Phillippe Janvier to be the earliest holocephalans. They have alternatively been considered unrelated placoderms. Taxa that are conventionally assumed to be stem-group chondrichthyans such as Pucapampella and Gladbachus from the Early-Middle Devonian have also occasionally been suggested to be the first holocephalans. Tooth fossils that are confidently considered to belong to the group first appear during the Middle Devonian (Givetian stage), although molecular clock and tip dating does suggest an earlier origin. Based on this data, it is proposed that the total-group Holocephali split from the Elasmobranchii between the Silurian and the Early Devonian, with estimates ranging from 421–401 million years ago depending on the methods of dating employed. By the Famennian stage of the Late Devonian early members of many holocephalan orders had appeared, although no skeletons or body fossils are known until the following Carboniferous period. The Chimaeriformes may have evolved during the Mississippian subperiod of the Carboniferous, although other estimates suggest a much later Triassic or Jurassic origin of this group.

Total-group Holocephali has seen a significant decline in diversity since the Paleozoic, and only the morphologically-conserved order Chimaeriformes survives today. The holocephalans peaked in diversity during the Mississippian, and they make up the majority of known chondrichthyan taxa from the time. Diversity remained relatively high throughout the later Carboniferous (Pennsylvanian subperiod), but the group saw a significant decline in diversity at the Carboniferous-Permian boundary which continued through the rest of the Permian period. By the end of the Permian, most holocephalan groups had become extinct, although the Eugeneodontiformes remained widespread and diverse for a brief period during the Early Triassic. While the order Chimaeriformes continued throughout the Mesozoic, the suborders Myriacanthoidei and Squalorajoidei (sometimes order Squalorajiformes) became extinct during the Jurassic period, leaving only three families in the suborder Chimaeroidea persisting through the Cenozoic and into the present. Today, chimaeras make up as few as 4% of named cartilaginous fish, and consist of 60 known species.

=== Ancestry ===
Several groups have been proposed as sister taxa or potential ancestors of the Chimaeriformes. Some authors have favored a close relationship between the Chondrenchelyiformes and the chimaeras, as despite their wildly different postcranial structure they have similar tooth and skull anatomy. The Chimaeriformes may have alternatively evolved from other fishes within the larger clade Cochliodontimorpha, as while the tooth plates of adult cochliodonts and chimaeriforms differ in their morphology, the tooth plates of juvenile cochliodonts and modern chimaeras are very similar. Below is a cladogram proposed by Grogan and Lund (2004) for one possible phylogeny of Holocephali (considered by them Euchondrocephali), which nests Chimaeriformes within a poorly-resolved clade also containing the cochliodonts. A modified version of this cladogram was also utilized by Grogan, Lund & Greenfest-Allen (2012) which excludes the Iniopterygiformes from Holocephali.

- Euchondrocephali (=Holocephali sensu lato)
  - - †Gregoriidae
    - - †Orodontiformes
      - - †Helodontiformes
        - - †Chom2
          - †Petalodontiformes
  - - †ElWeir (="El Weirdo")
    - - - †Debeeriiformes
        - †Iniopterygia (=Iniopterygiformes)
      - - †L2SP
        - - †Eugeneodontida (=Eugeneodontiformes)
          - Holocephalimorpha
            - †Harpacanthus
            - Holocephali sensu stricto
              - †Harpagofututor (Chondrenchelyiformes)
              - - †Squaloraja (Squalorajiformes?)
                - - Chimaeriformes
                  - - †Acanthorhina (Myriacanthiformes?)
                    - - - †cf. Physonemus
                        - †Cochlliodont 1 (="Coch1")
                        - †Echinochimaera
                      - †Menaspiformes

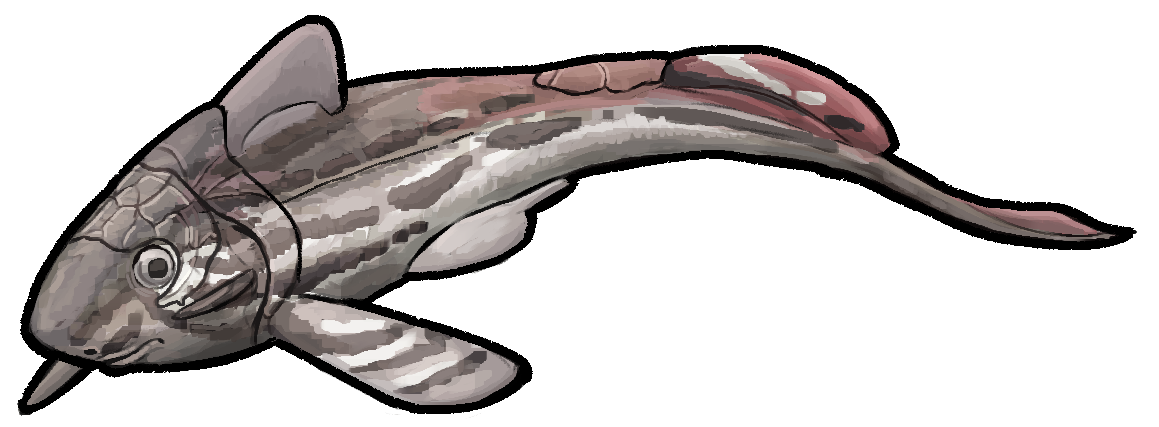
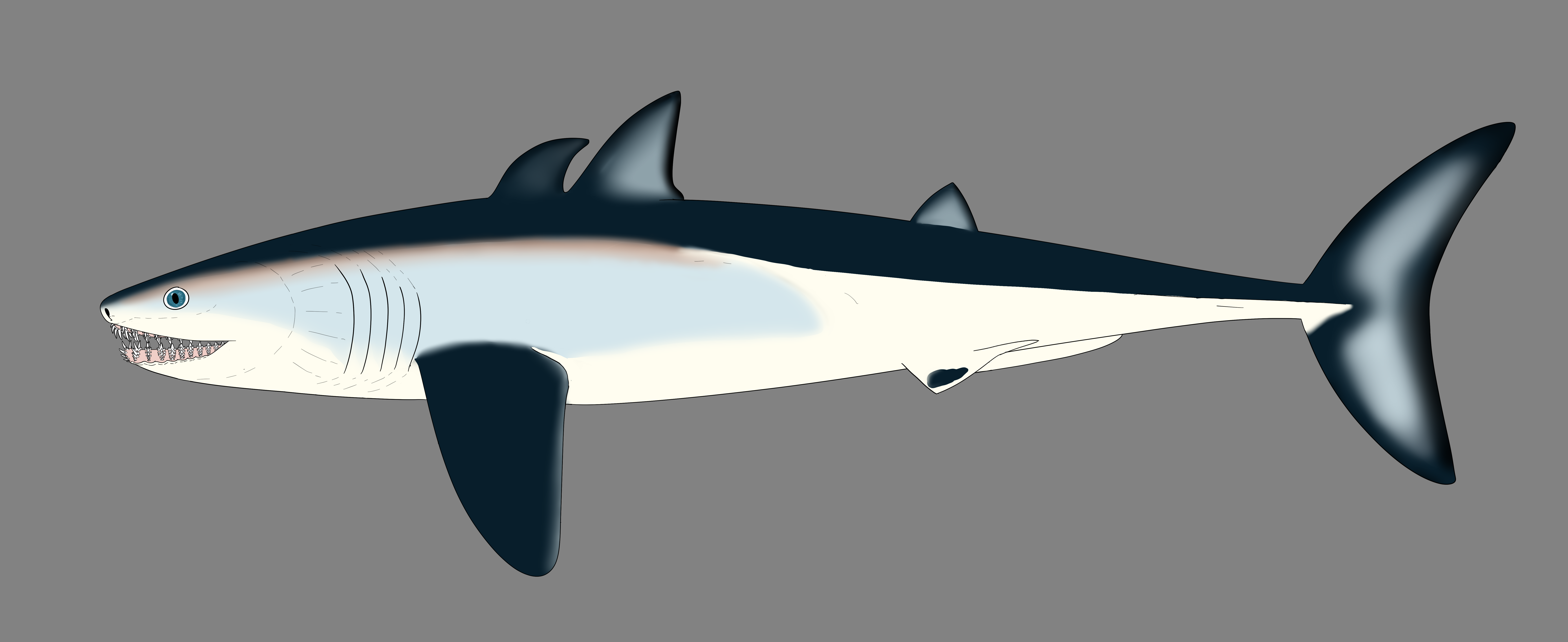
Historically, debate arose as to whether placoderms such as Ctenurella (above) or shark-like chondrichthyans such as Cladoselache (below) were the ancestors of Holocephali

While it is now accepted that Holocephali is the sister group to Elasmobranchii based on both morphology and genetics, this was historically a matter of debate. Two competing hypotheses were proposed for the evolution of the holocephalans: either they were descended from a shark-like ancestor, making the class Chondrichthyes a true, monophyletic (natural) group, or they were descended from some unrelated lineage of placoderms, making Chondrichthyes a polyphyletic (unnatural) grouping. A particular group of placoderms called the Ptyctodontiformes (or Ptyctodontida) were suggested by researchers Tor Ørvig and Erik Stensiö to be the direct ancestors of Holocephali due to their chimaera-like anatomy. Under this scheme, chimaeras are considered unrelated to any Paleozoic cartilaginous fish, and potentially also unrelated to the Mesozoic Squaloraja and myriacanthids. While the ptyctodonts do share many holocephalan-like features, such as a synarcual formed from the frontmost vertebrae, a fin spine, an operculum, and specialized pelvic and prepelvic claspers, these are now believed to result from convergent evolution. An alternative hypothesis, advocated for by researcher Colin Patterson, was that the holocephalans were neither descended from the elasmobranchs nor the ptyctodonts, and instead shared a distant common ancestor with both groups within the larger clade Elasmobranchiomorpha. In light of the description of holocephalan transitional fossils during the 1970s and 1980s an independent origin of the two subclasses of Chondrichthyes has been disregarded, and Elasmobranchii and Holocephali are united by the shared anatomy of their pelvic claspers and the tesserae that reinforce their cartilage skeletons.

Within Chondrichthyes, three contemporary hypotheses are proposed for the evolutionary relationship between Holocephali and groups traditionally considered elasmobranchs. Richard Lund and Eileen Grogan have suggested a deep split between the elasmobranchs and the holocephalans, with the Holocephali descending from a distant chondrichthyan ancestor with an autodiastylic jaw. Following Philippe Janvier's suggestion of close relation, some researchers have instead proposed that ancestral holocephalans were similar in anatomy to cladodonts like the Symmoriiformes and Cladoselache and that those groups may be reflective of the ancestral holocephalan state. Researcher Michal Ginter and coauthors have alternatively suggested that the holocephalans are descended from an Orodus-like animal, and are close relatives of hybodonts, protacrodonts and crown-group elasmobranchs. Ginter and coauthor's proposal is based on the similar tooth morphology between these four groups, particularly the anatomy of the tooth base or root. This analysis restricts the definition of crown-group Chondrichthyes and regards the iniopterygians, Symmoriiformes, and cladoselachians as stem-group Chondrichthyes.

== Ecology ==
=== Bear Gulch Limestone ===
The Bear Gulch Limestone, a unit of the Heath Formation located in the state of Montana, has been recognized for preserving complete body fossils of fishes dating to the Mississippian subperiod. The majority of fish species known from the site are chondrichthyans, of which more than 40 are early holocephalans. Many of the holocephalans known from Bear Gulch belong to lineages that are otherwise known only from teeth or are entirely unrecognized. These fossils also preserve gut contents, color patterns, complete life histories, and internal organs, allowing for a detailed understanding of the animal's ecology and behavior. The site preserves an exceptional diversity of species, and is considered the most completely preserved Paleozoic cartilaginous fish fauna known. The environmental conditions and faunal composition of Bear Gulch are believed to be representative of other, less well-known Mississippian marine fossil formations elsewhere in the world. The Bear Gulch limestone is designated as a Konservat-Lagerstätte by paleontologists, and forms much of the basis for our modern understanding of early holocephalan evolution and ecology. Additional sites, such as the Glencartholm and Manse Burn shales of Scotland have also yielded detailed holocephalan fossils from the early Carbonifeorus.

=== Habitats ===
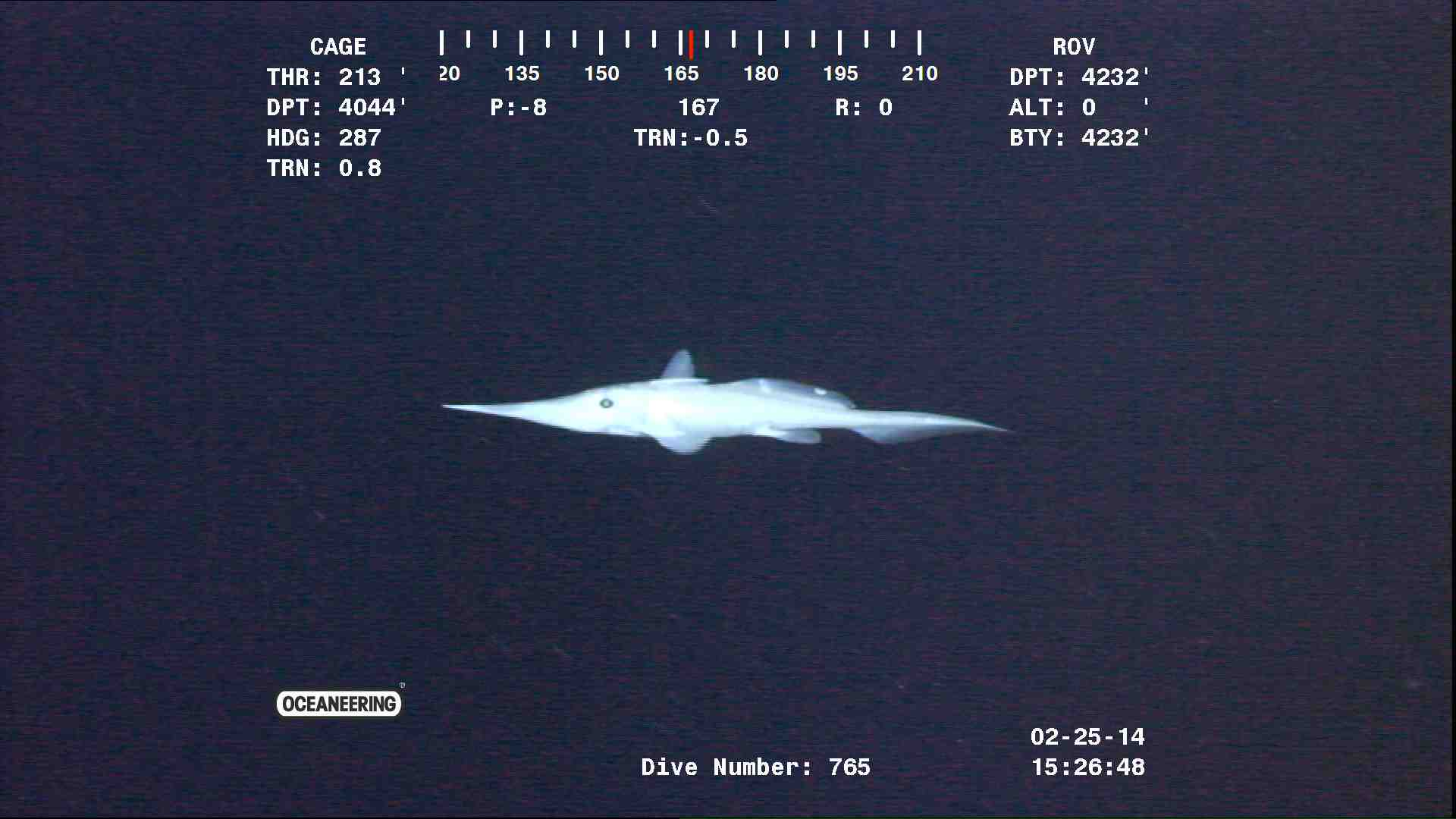
A modern rhinochimaerid photographed at a depth of 1,290 metres (4,230 ft)

Both living and fossil holocephalans have a worldwide distribution. All chimaeras and nearly all extinct holocephalans are known from marine environments, although the helodont Helodus simplex is known from a freshwater deposit. Living chimaeras are specialized for deep sea habitats, with only Hydrolagus colliei and the three species of Callorhinchus being regularly found in waters shallower than 200 meters. While some authors have suggested holocephalans inhabited deep-water environments since the Paleozoic or Mesozoic, ancestral chimaeras are alternatively thought to have been shallow-water fishes, and the radiation of the group into deepwater niches instead occurred only during the early Cenozoic era.

=== Diet ===
Adaptations for a duropagous diet such as flattened tooth plates and a fused, immobile skull are prevalent among extinct and living holocephalans, but feeding styles are greatly variable. Modern chimaeras are generalist, opportunist feeders that regularly eat both soft-bodied and shelled prey. The genus Callorhinchus is known to eat worms, crustaceans and hard-shelled mollusks, and other chimaeras are also known to prey on small fish. Smaller prey are often eaten whole via suction feeding, which is achieved using the muscles of the throat and flexible, cartilaginous lips. The bite forces of chimaeras are weaker than those of durophagous sharks, and chimaeras may rely on their vomerine tooth plates to split and crack shells rather than solely crushing them. Mesozoic chimaeriforms likely had similar feeding strategies to their modern relatives.

During the late Paleozoic, many holocephalan lineages became specialized for feeding styles besides durophagy. The edestoids, a lineage of Eugeneodontiformes, were pelagic macropredators which fed on fish and cephalopods. The genus Edestus has been proposed to have fed by processing prey between its paired tooth-whorls, while the related Helicoprion may have been a specialist hunter of belemnoids and ammonoids. The poorly-known petalodont Megactenopetalus may have also been a macropredator based on its large, interlocking blade-like tooth plates. The iniopterygian Iniopera was a specialized suction feeder that fed in a similar manner to some living bony fish and aquatic salamanders. Other iniopterygians have been considered specialists that shredded soft-bodied prey with their mobile tooth whorls.

=== Parasites ===
Modern holocephalans are vulnerable to a range of parasitic infections. Among these are tapeworms of the order Gyrocotylidea, which are found only in chimaeras and are thought to be a primitive, relict group. Fossilized tapeworms are also known in the symmoriiform Cobelodus, which represent the earliest evidence of parasitism in the group if Symmoriiformes are considered members of Holocephali.

== See also ==
- Evolution of fish
- List of chimaeras
- List of prehistoric cartilaginous fish
