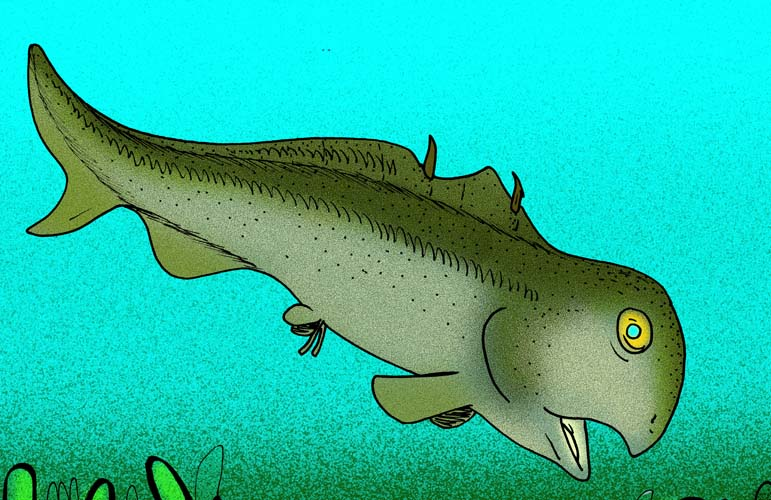
- Artist's reconstruction

Scientific classification
- Kingdom: Animalia
- Phylum: Chordata
- Class: Chondrichthyes
- Subclass: Holocephali
- Order: Polysentoriformes
- Family: Polysentoridae Zangerl, 1979
- Genus: Polysentor Zangerl, 1979
- Species: P. gorbairdi

Binomial name
- Polysentor gorbairdi Zangerl, 1979

= Polysentor =

Extinct genus of cartilaginous fishes

Polysentor gorbairdi is an extinct holocephalian that lived during the Pennsylvanian. It is a member of the Mazon Creek fauna of Illinois.
