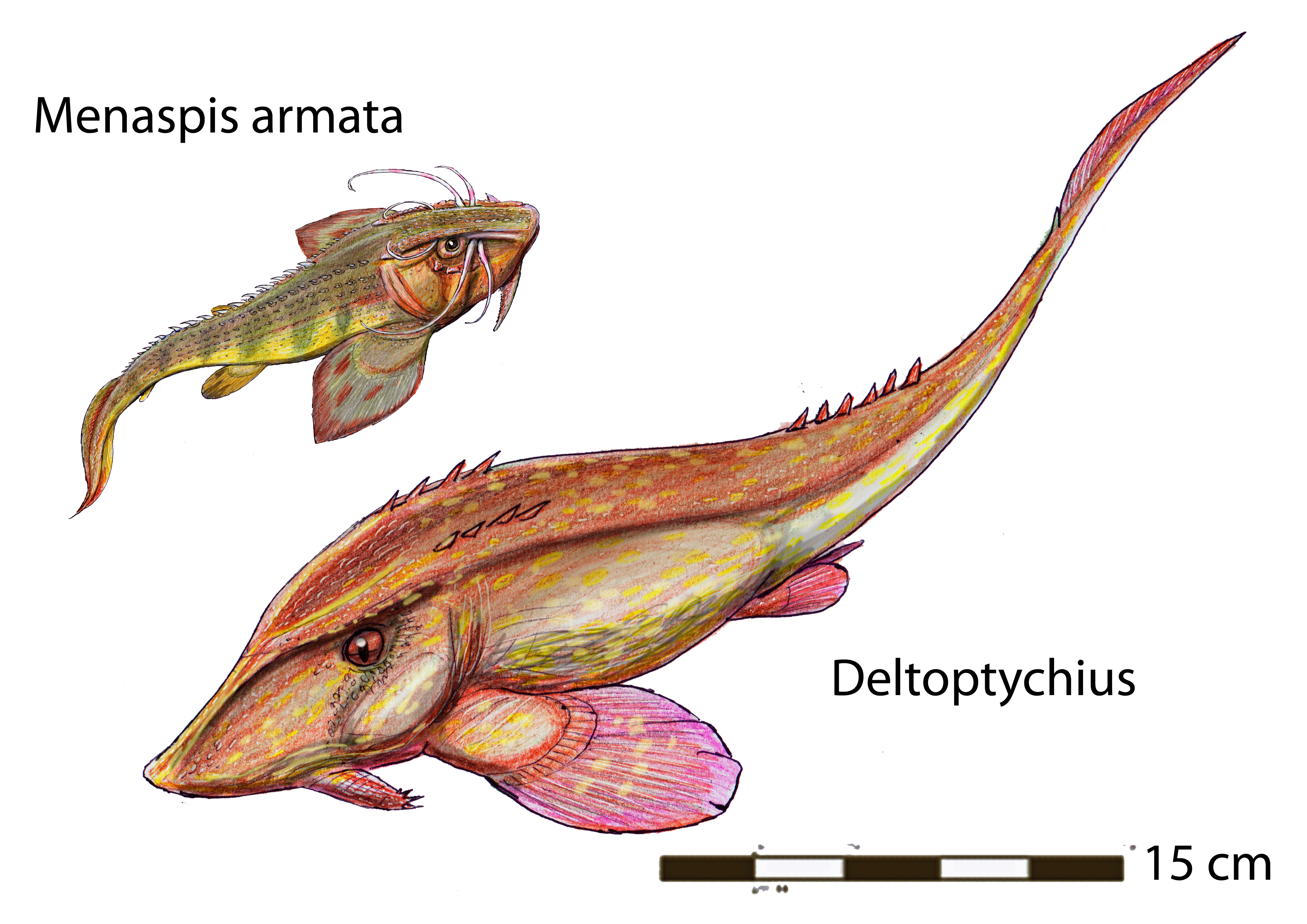
- Life reconstructions of Menaspis and Deltoptychius

Scientific classification
- Kingdom: Animalia
- Phylum: Chordata
- Class: Chondrichthyes
- Subclass: Holocephali
- Order: †Menaspiformes; Nelson, 2006

Type genus
- Menaspis Edward, 1848

Families and genera
- †Deltoptychiidae; †Menaspidae; †Traquairiidae; †Listracanthus?

= Menaspiformes =

Menaspiformes Temporal range: Carboniferous–Permian Possible member Listracanthus survives until the Olenekian.

Extinct order of cartilaginous fishes

Menaspiformes are an extinct order of holocephalans known from the Carboniferous and Permian periods, with a possible member, Listracanthus, known from the Early Triassic. Members of the order are believed to be durophagous benthic carnivores. While historically menaspiforms were classified under Chimaeriformes, they are today recognized as a separate order.
