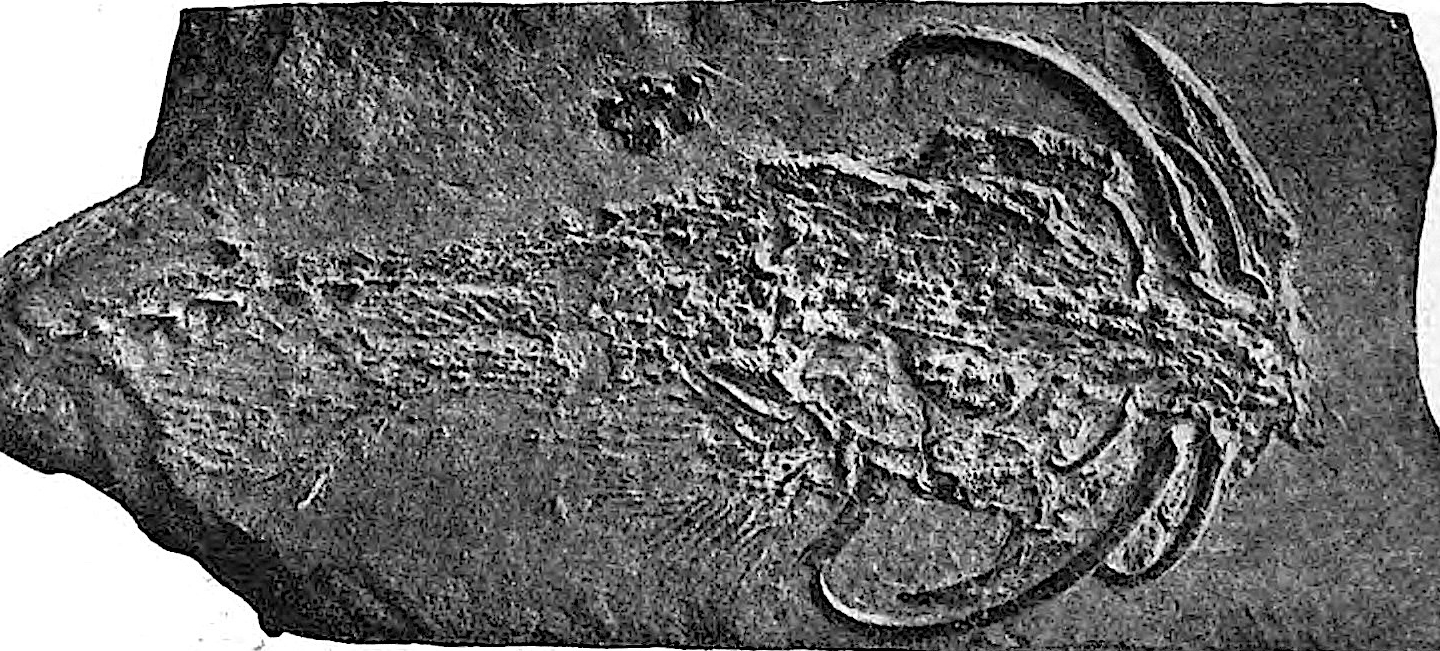
- Body fossil of a male M. armata from the Kupferschiefer
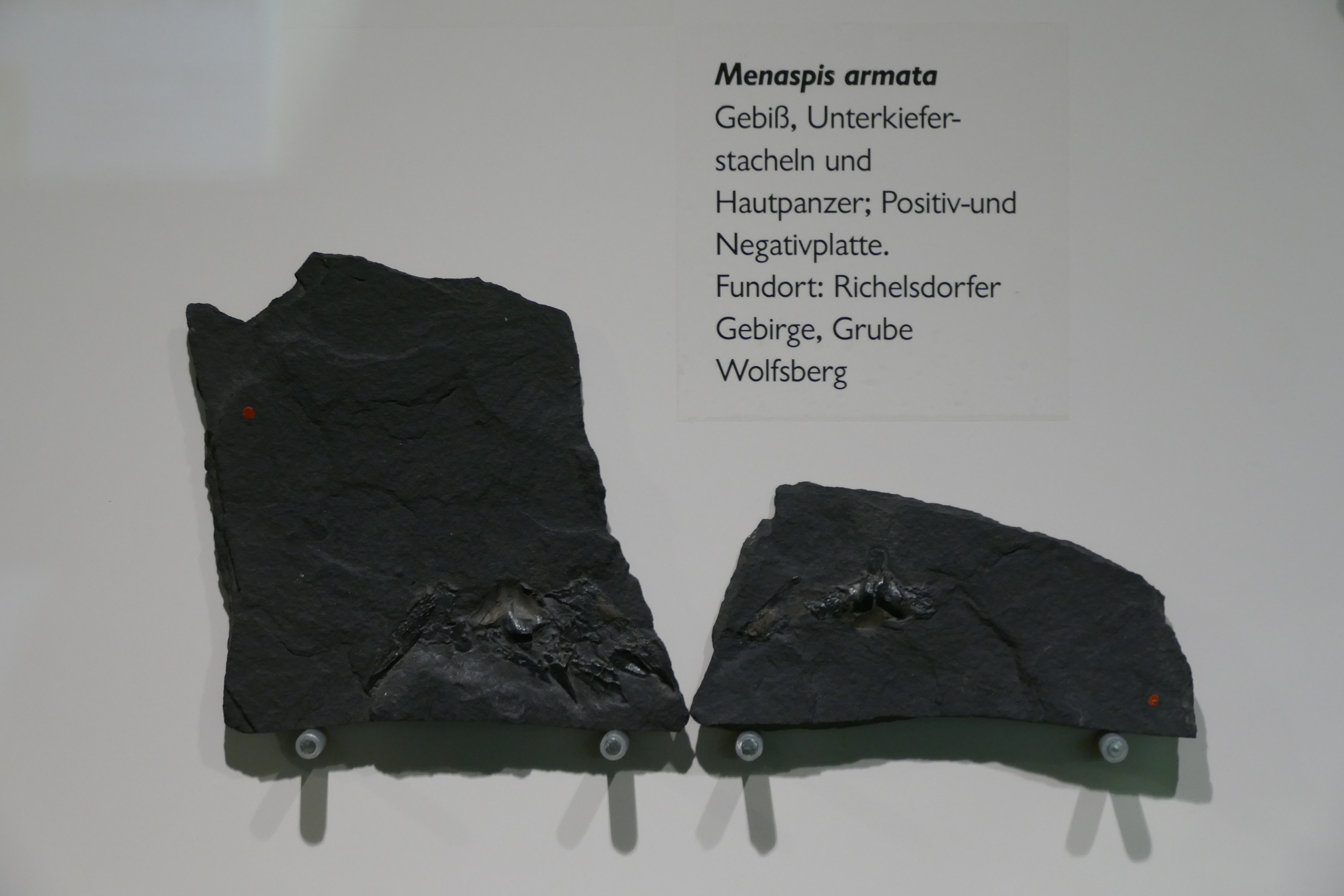
- Tooth plates and jaws of M armata on display at the Ottoneum Museum of Natural History

Scientific classification
- Kingdom: Animalia
- Phylum: Chordata
- Class: Chondrichthyes
- Subclass: Holocephali
- Order: †Menaspiformes
- Family: †Menaspidae
- Genus: †Menaspis; Ewald, 1848
- Species: †M. armata

Binomial name
- †Menaspis armata Ewald, 1848

= Menaspis =

Menaspis Temporal range: Wuchiapingian

Extinct genus of cartilaginous fishes

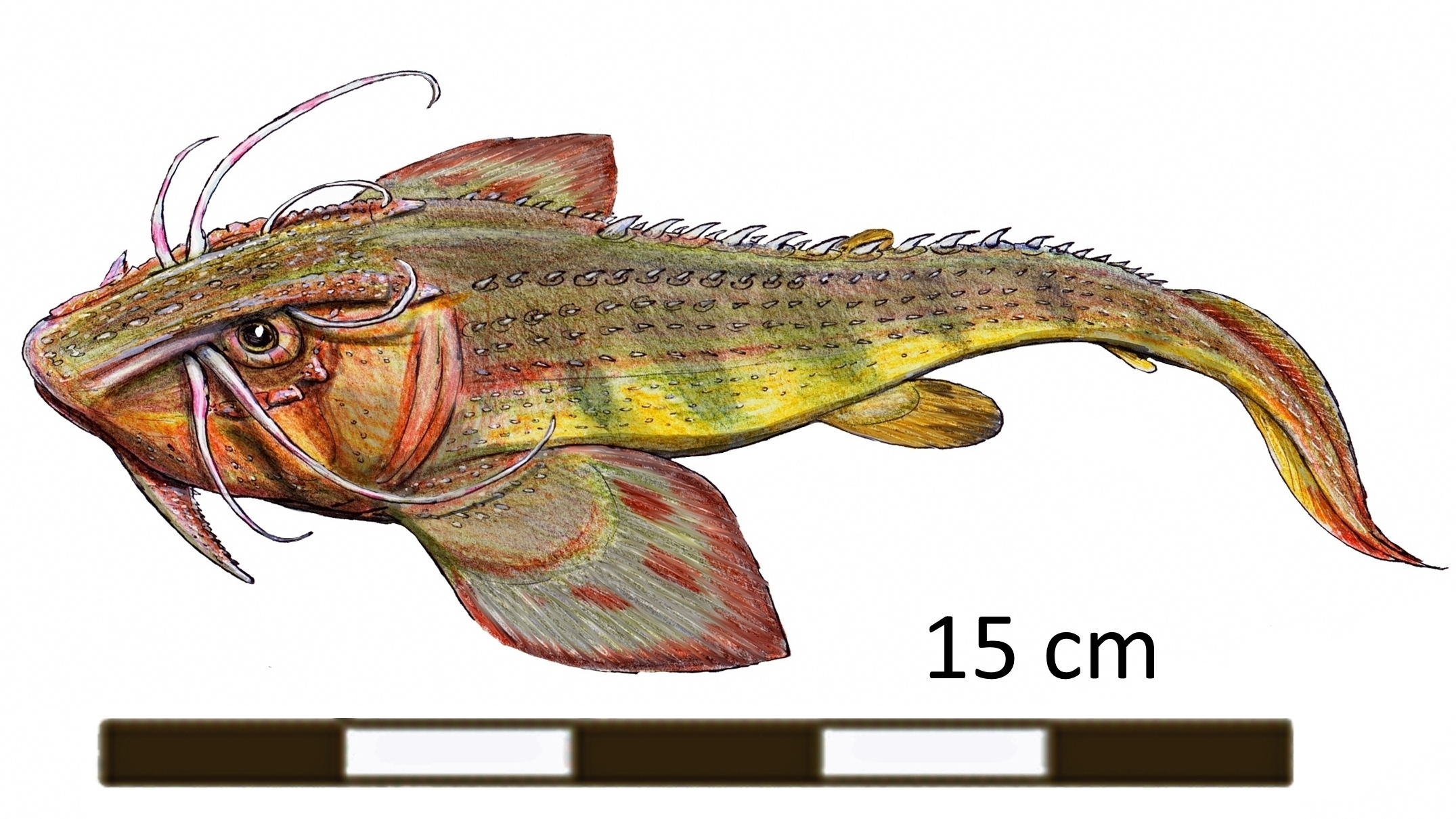
Life reconstruction of a male M. armata

Menaspis is an extinct genus of holocephalian cartilaginous fish from the Permian period (Wuchiapingian stage). The only species in this genus is Menaspis armata.
