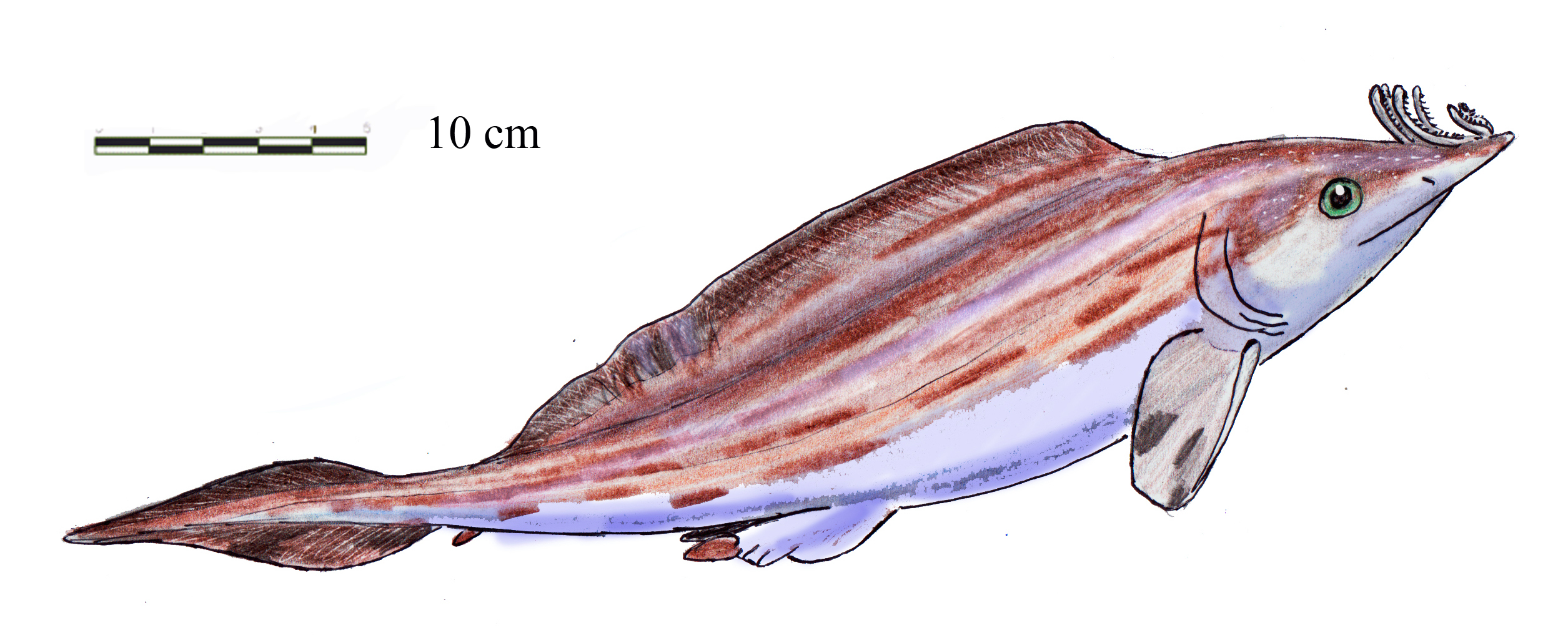
- Restoration

Scientific classification
- Kingdom: Animalia
- Phylum: Chordata
- Class: Chondrichthyes
- Genus: Harpacanthus Traquair, 1886
- Species: H. fimbriatus

= Harpacanthus =

Harpacanthus Temporal range: Carboniferous

Extinct genus of cartilaginous fishes

Harpacanthus is an extinct genus of cartilaginous fish.
