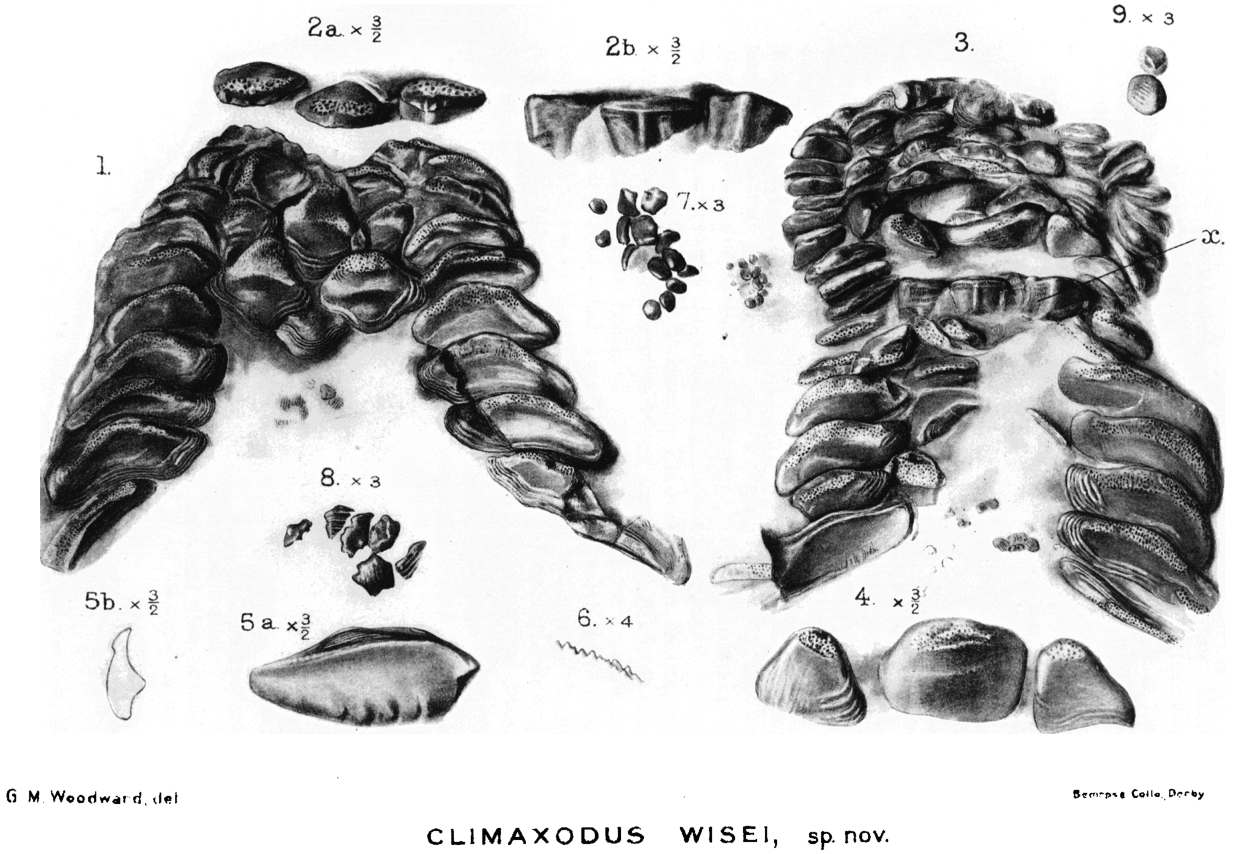
- Articulated tooth-plates of the petalodont Tanaodus (formerly Climaxodus), a member of the Bradyodonti
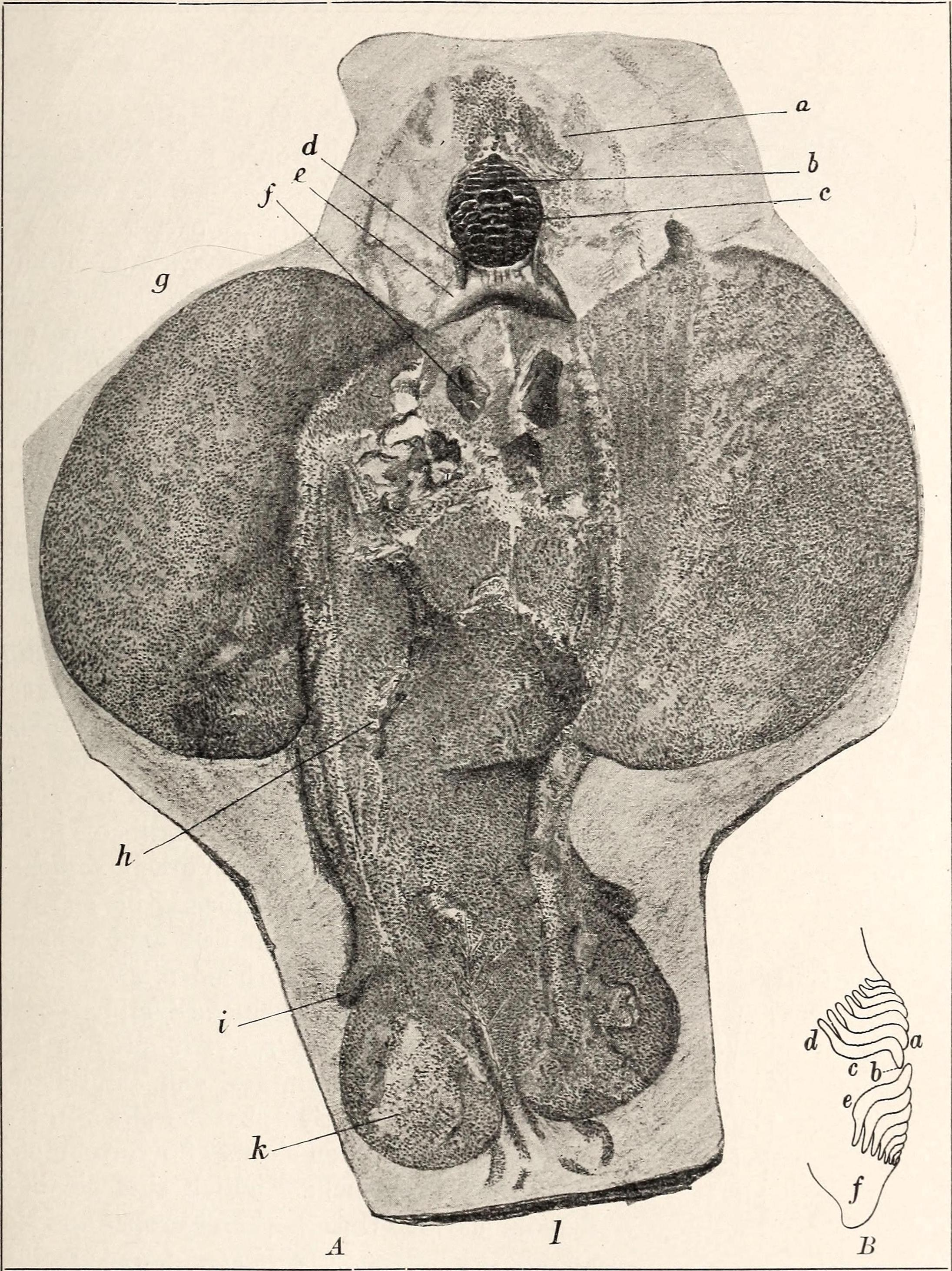
- Well-preserved body fossil of the petalodont Janassa bituminosa

Scientific classification
- Kingdom: Animalia
- Phylum: Chordata
- Class: Chondrichthyes
- Order: †Bradyodonti; Woodward, 1921

Orders
- See text

= Bradyodonti =

Bradyodonti Temporal range: Late Devonian–Permian Descendant taxon Chimaeriformes survives to present

Extinct order of cartilaginous fishes

Bradyodonti (Greek for "slow teeth", in reference to their assumed rate of tooth replacement) is an obsolete order of cartilaginous fishes (class Chondrichthyes) which lived during the Paleozoic Era and which are sometimes considered extinct. They first appeared toward the end of the Devonian Period, were present through the Carboniferous Period, and, as initially defined, became extinct by the end of the Permian Period. "Bradyodont" can also refer to the present-day chimaeras of the order Chimaeriformes, which are widely considered descendants of bradyodont-grade fishes. The group is essentially synonymous with the subclass Holocephali. Most bradyodont fossils consist only of isolated jaws and teeth. Their upper jaws were typically fused to the neurocranium (holostylic), and their teeth formed flat, slow-growing plates used to crush prey.

The following taxa have been referred to the Bradyodonti:

- Chimaeriformes
- Chondrenchelyiformes
- Cochliodontiformes
- Copodontiformes
- Eugeneodontiformes (typically as Edestidae; the Helicoprionidae were historically excluded based on divergent morphology)
- Helodontiformes
- Menaspiformes
- Orodontiformes
- Petalodontiformes
- Psammodontidae

Researchers such as Svend Erik Bendix-Almgreen have proposed that the conventional "bradyodont" taxa represent two or more unrelated radiations of fish, some closer to living cartilaginous fishes and some descended from unrelated placoderms. This view has not been supported by subsequent authors, who continue to regard the bradyodonts as an assemblage of early holocephalans.
