= Siksika ottae =

Siksika ottae Temporal range: Namurian

Scientific classification
- Kingdom: Animalia
- Phylum: Chordata
- Class: Chondrichthyes
- Subclass: Holocephali
- Order: †Petalodontiformes
- Family: †Petalodontidae
- Genus: †Siksika; Lund, 1989
- Species: †S. ottae

Binomial name
- †Siksika ottae Lund, 1989

Extinct species of cartilaginous fish

Siksika ottae is an extinct species of petalodont (a type of prehistoric cartilaginous fish), which lived during the Upper Mississippian. It has been discovered at the well known Carboniferous-aged Bear Gulch Limestone (Montana, United States). It is known primarily from fossil teeth, but also from partial neurocranium and mandibles which hint at a close relationship to coeval petalodontiforms such as Janassa and Netsepoye. Dentition is generally heterodont. Siksika translates to Blackfoot, being named after the Siksika Nation.
