= Megactenopetalus =

Megactenopetalus Temporal range: Kungurian– Wuchiapingian

Scientific classification
- Kingdom: Animalia
- Phylum: Chordata
- Class: Chondrichthyes
- Subclass: Holocephali
- Order: †Petalodontiformes
- Family: †Pristodontidae
- Genus: †Megactenopetalus; David, 1944

Extinct genus of cartilaginous fishes

Megactenopetalus is an extinct genus of petalodont fish which lived from the late Early Permian through the Late Permian. It is known from a single species: M. kaibabanus. It was one of the last and largest petalodonts; estimates place it at 1.6 meters or 5.2 feet in length with a 20 centimeter or 7 inch mouth. It is known from the southwest of the United States, the Middle East, and China. The holotype was an upper left dentary which came from the Kaibab Formation on the northern rim of the Grand Canyon. It is probably closely related to Ctenoptychius.
