= Netsepoye =

Netsepoye Temporal range: Mississippian

Scientific classification
- Kingdom: Animalia
- Phylum: Chordata
- Class: Chondrichthyes
- Subclass: Holocephali
- Order: †Petalodontiformes
- Family: †Belantseidae
- Genus: †Netsepoye
- Species: †N. hawesi

Binomial name
- †Netsepoye hawesi Lund, 1989

Extinct genus of cartilaginous fishes

Netsepoye is an extinct genus of cartilaginous fish distantly related to the modern order Chimaeriformes, containing the single species Netspoye hawesi. It lived more than 320 million years ago during the Late Mississippian.

== Etymology ==
The name Netsepoye comes from a Native American term, meaning "the people that speaks the same language". The word refers to the Blackfoot Confederacy, hinting that the fossil specimen is in Blackfoot territory as well as another petalodontiform Siksika ottae.

== Sites ==
The species was described from the well known Bear Gulch Limestone in Montana, United States, dated to the Carboniferous period. This Paleozoic fish is mostly known by teeth, although the cephalic region and the rest of the body are partially preserved. Pectoral fins were very broad and the pelvic girdle showed very high dorsal process. Netsepoye hawesi is closely related to Janassa.
