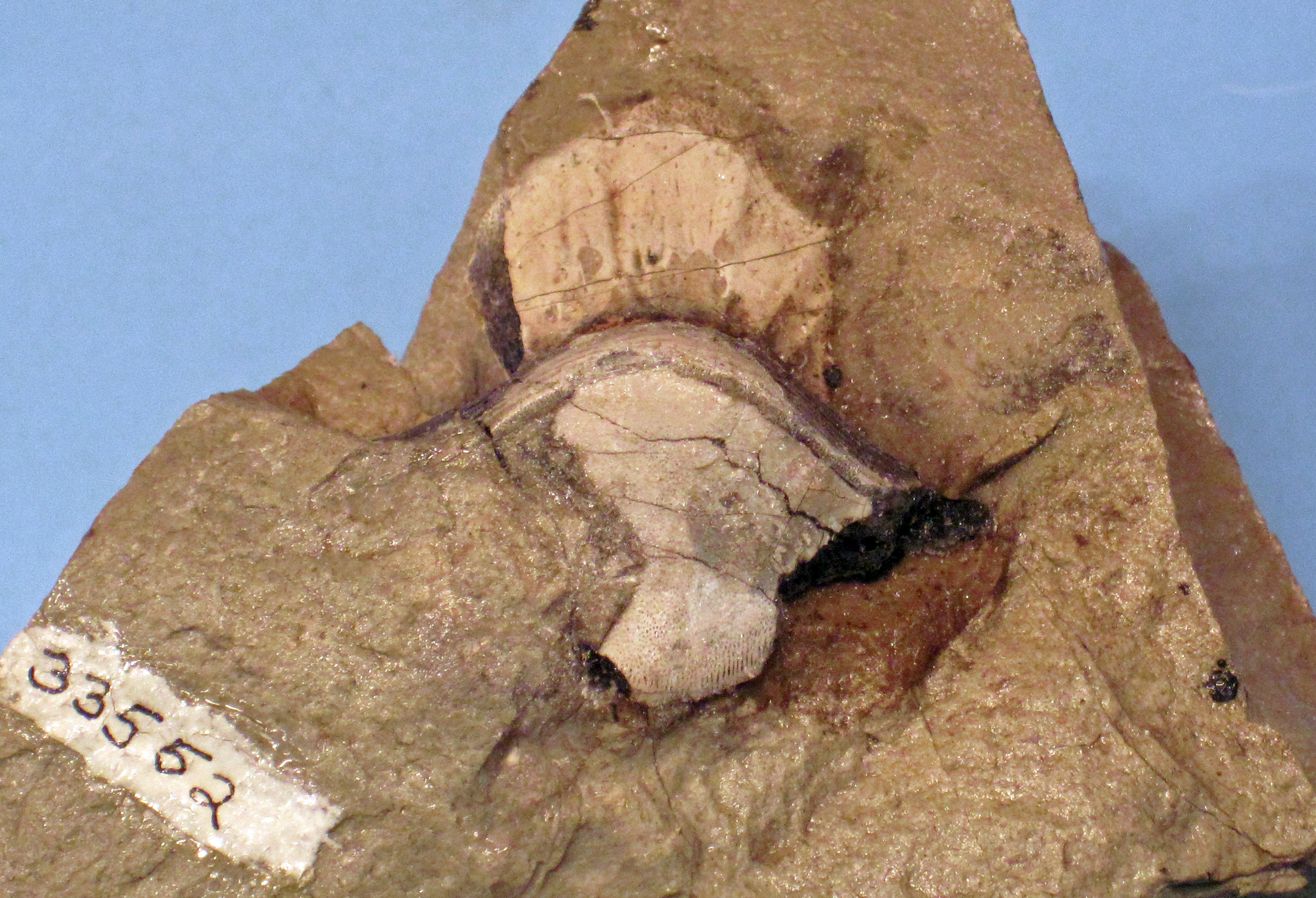
- Teeth of Petalodus ohioensis (Carboniferous).

Scientific classification
- Domain: Eukaryota
- Kingdom: Animalia
- Phylum: Chordata
- Class: Chondrichthyes
- Subclass: Holocephali
- Order: †Petalodontiformes
- Family: †Petalodontidae; Newberry & Worthen, 1866

Genera
- †Ageleodus; †Antliodus; †Chomatodus; †Ctenoptychius; †Glyphanodus; †Harpacodus; †Lisogodus; †Neopetalodus; †Paracymatodus; †Petalodus; †Polyrhizodus; †Serratodus; †Siksika; †Tanaodus

= Petalodontidae =

Petalodontidae Temporal range: Lower Carboniferous to Permian

Extinct family of cartilaginous fishes

Petalodontidae is an extinct family of marine cartilaginous fish related to the modern-day chimaeras, found in what is now the United States of America and Europe. With a very few exceptions, they are known entirely from teeth. All fossils range from the Carboniferous to the Permian, where they are presumed to have died out during the Permian/Triassic extinction event.
