= Antliodus =

Antliodus Temporal range: Mississippian

Scientific classification
- Kingdom: Animalia
- Phylum: Chordata
- Class: Chondrichthyes
- Subclass: Holocephali
- Order: †Petalodontiformes
- Family: †Petalodontidae
- Genus: †Antliodus; Newberry & Worthen, 1866

Species
- A. cucullus; A. minutus; A. parvulus; A. politus; A. sarculus; A. similis; A. simplex; A. sulcatus; A. truncatus; A. robustus; A. gracilis; A. arctuatus

Extinct genus of cartilaginous fishes

Antliodus is an extinct genus of petalodont from the Carboniferous Period. It is known from the Mississippian of the United States, Britain, and Belgium Though many species have been reported in the past, a lack of recent revisions means some may be dubious.
