= Chomatodus =

Scientific classification
- Kingdom: Animalia
- Phylum: Chordata
- Class: Chondrichthyes
- Subclass: Holocephali
- Order: †Petalodontiformes
- Family: †Petalodontidae
- Genus: †Chomatodus; Agassiz, 1838

Species
- See text

Extinct genus of cartilaginous fishes

Chomatodus (from Greek: χωμα choma, 'mound' and Greek: ὀδούς odoús 'tooth') is a prehistoric cartilaginous fish genus.

== Species ==
- †Chomatodus affinis Newberry & Worthen, 1866
- †Chomatodus angulatus Newberry & Worthen, 1866
- †Chomatodus angustus Newberry, 1879
- †Chomatodus arcuatus St. John, 1870
- †Chomatodus chesterensis St. John & Worthen, 1875
- †Chomatodus comptus St. John & Worthen, 1875
- †Chomatodus costatus Newberry & Worthen, 1866
- †Chomatodus cultellus Anonymous author(s)
- †Chomatodus davisi Woodward, 1889
- †Chomatodus dentatus Anonymous author(s)
- †Chomatodus elegans Newberry & Worthen, 1866 Remains have been found in Keokuk Limestone, Keokuk, Iowa, United States.
- †Chomatodus gracillimus Newberry & Worthen, 1866
- †Chomatodus inconstans St. John & Worthen, 1875
- †Chomatodus incrassatus Anonymous author(s)
- †Chomatodus insignis Leidy, 1857
- †Chomatodus lamelliformis Davis, 1884
- †Chomatodus lanesvillensis Anonymous author(s)
- †Chomatodus linearis Agassiz, 1843
- †Chomatodus loriformis Anonymous author(s)
- †Chomatodus molaris Newberry & Worthen, 1866
- †Chomatodus newberryi Anonymous author(s)
- †Chomatodus parallelus Anonymous author(s)
- †Chomatodus piasaensis Anonymous author(s)
- †Chomatodus ponticulus Anonymous author(s)
- †Chomatodus pusillus Newberry & Worthen, 1866
- †Chomatodus selliformis Anonymous author(s)
- †Chomatodus varsouviensis Anonymous author(s)

== See also ==
- List of prehistoric cartilaginous fish genera
