= Euctenius =

Euctenius Temporal range: Pennsylvanian, 315 Ma

Scientific classification
- Kingdom: Animalia
- Phylum: Chordata
- Infraphylum: Gnathostomata
- Genus: †Euctenius; Traquair, 1881

Type species
- †Ctenoptychius unilateralis

Extinct genus of vertebrates

Euctenius is an extinct genus of vertebrate containing a single species, Euctenius unilateralis. It was initially described as the tooth of the petalodont genus Ctenoptychius or as a genus of edestid, although it more likely represents the copulatory organ of an amphibian. Fossils of Euctenius have been uncovered in Scotland and England and date to the Late Carboniferous period. Identical structures are known to have been paired around the cloaca of Opiderpetonids and were most likely used to clasp while mating. The edge of the structure is finely serrated, and it is covered in enamel.
