= Iberolepis =

Iberolepis Temporal range: Early Devonian, 418.9–401.3 Ma

Scientific classification
- Kingdom: Animalia
- Phylum: Chordata
- Class: Chondrichthyes
- Subclass: Elasmobranchii
- Order: †Cladoselachida
- Genus: †Iberolepis; Mader, 1986

Type species
- †Iberolepis aragonensis Mader, 1986

Extinct genus of cartilaginous fish

Iberolepis (ibero meaning "Iberic" in Latin and lepis meaning "scale") is an extinct genus of cartilaginous fish, one of early elasmobranchii's from the Early Devonian found in Spain. It includes a single species, I. aragonensis, which is known only from scales. The exact classification of this species is very incertain, he was originally classified as species of basal cladoselachiform, but recent studies suggest he bellongs to a separate and extinct order with your related genus, Lunalepis. Other fossils of Iberolepis found in same locality that represent indeterminate species, include a possible second species of same taxon.
