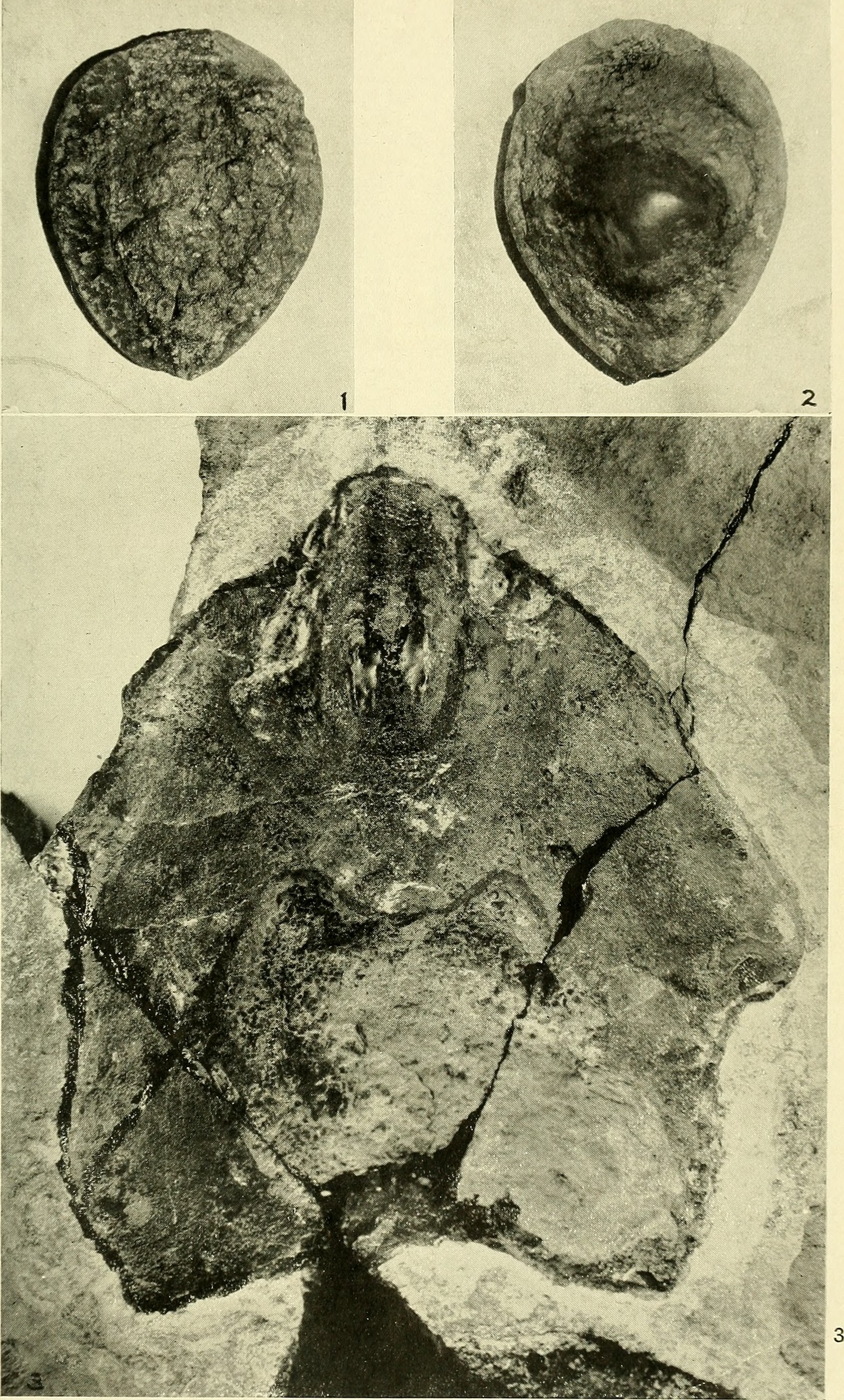
- Acmoniodus clarkei type specimen (Bottom)

Scientific classification
- Kingdom: Animalia
- Phylum: Chordata
- Class: Chondrichthyes
- Order: Copodontiformes
- Family: incertae sedis
- Genus: †Acmoniodus Hussakof & Bryant, 1918

= Acmoniodus =

Acmoniodus Temporal range: Frasnian

Extinct genus of cartilaginous fish

Acmoniodus is a poorly known extinct genus of Holocephalian fish from the Devonian period. It is known only by a singular species described from the lower Frasnian-aged Geneseo Shale of New York (state): A. clarkei.
