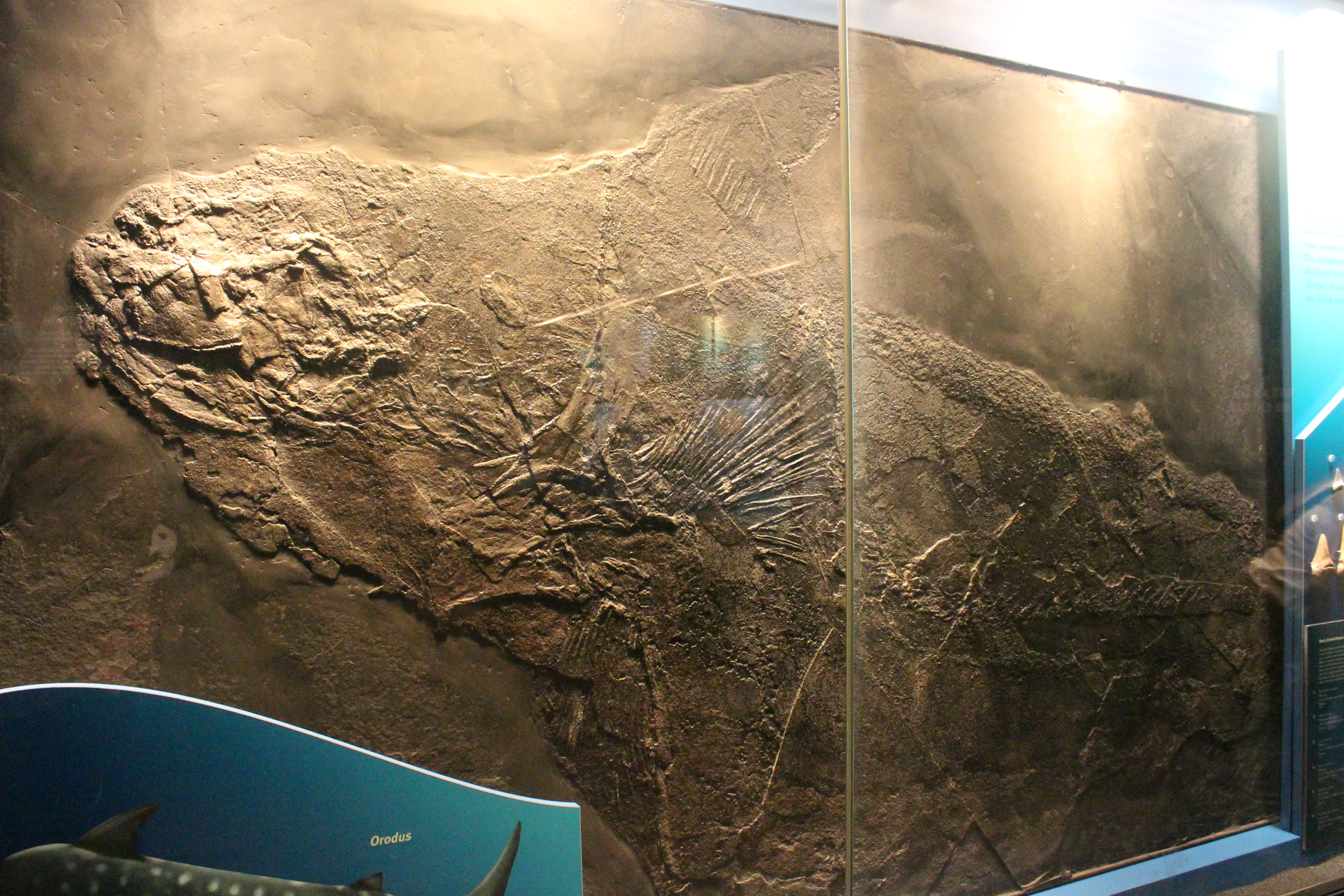
- Fossil specimen (FMNH PF 2201) of O. greggi, Field Museum of Natural History

Scientific classification
- Kingdom: Animalia
- Phylum: Chordata
- Class: Chondrichthyes
- Subclass: Holocephali
- Order: †Orodontiformes
- Family: †Orodontidae; De Koninck 1878
- Genus: †Orodus; Agassiz, 1838

Valid species (per Ginter et al. 2010)
- †O. cinctus Agassiz 1838; †O. elongatus Davis, 1883; †O. greggi Zangerl, 1981; †O. ipeunaensis Chahud, 2010; †O. mammillaris, Newberry and Worthen, 1866; †O. micropterygius Zangerl, 1981; †O. ramosus Zangerl, 1981; †O. variocostatus St. John and Worthen, 1875

Synonyms
- Oreodon

= Orodus =

Orodus Temporal range: Famennian–Pennsylvanian

Extinct genus of cartilaginous fishes

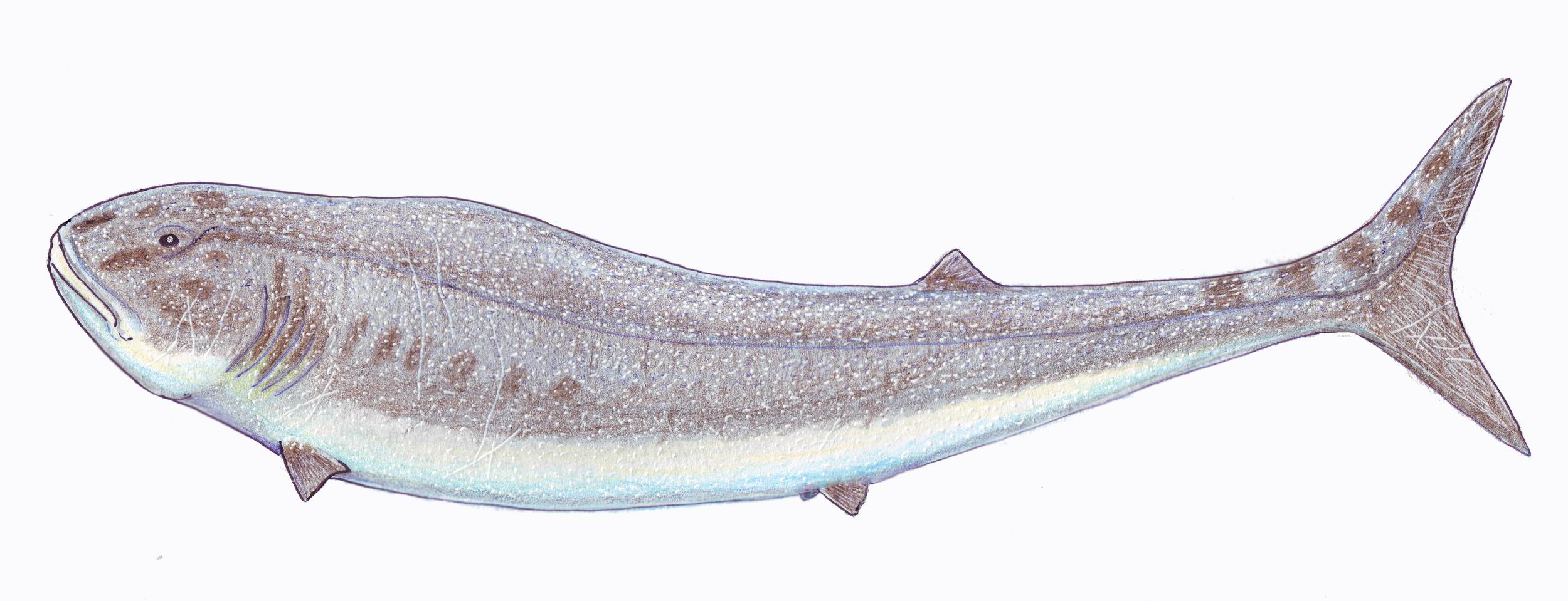
Life restoration of O. micropterygius

Orodus (from Greek: ωραίος oraíos, 'beautiful' and Greek: ὀδούς odoús 'tooth') is an extinct genus of orodontiform cartilaginous fish. Fossils are known from the late Devonian to Late Carboniferous of Europe, Asia and North America. Most species are only known from their rounded, ridge covered teeth, designed for crushing prey (durophagy). The genus has a long and complicated taxonomic history, and numerous species have been assigned to the genus that are now either considered invalid or unrelated to true orodontids. Two species, O. greggi and O. micropterygius from the Carboniferous of North America are known from remains preserving the body. O. greggi reached around 2–4 metres (6.6–13.1 ft) long, while O. micropterygius just reached 1 metre (3.3 ft). The largest species, O. ramosus, had a tooth width about 11 centimetres (4.3 in), and cross-scaling those teeth with related species with known body fossils implies a total length of 12–15 metres (39–49 ft), although these estimates have been considered unreasonable. These remains show that these species of Orodus lacked fin spines on their dorsal fins, and that they had small pectoral fins, and that the morphology of the teeth varied depending on their position in the mouth. Orodus was considered to be the only member of the family Orodontidae by Ginter et al. 2010. Like other orodontiforms, the closest living relatives of Orodus are thought to be chimaeras.

== Sources ==
- Wildlife of Gondwana: Dinosaurs and Other Vertebrates from the Ancient Supercontinent (Life of the Past) by Pat Vickers Rich, Thomas Hewitt Rich, Francesco Coffa, and Steven Morton
- Biology of Sharks and Their Relatives (Marine Biology) by Jeffrey C. Carrier, John A. Musick, and Michael R. Heithaus
- Kansas Geology: An Introduction to Landscapes, Rocks, Minerals, and Fossils by Rex Buchanan
- Major Events in Early Vertebrate Evolution (Systematics Association Special Volume) by Per Erik Ahlberg
