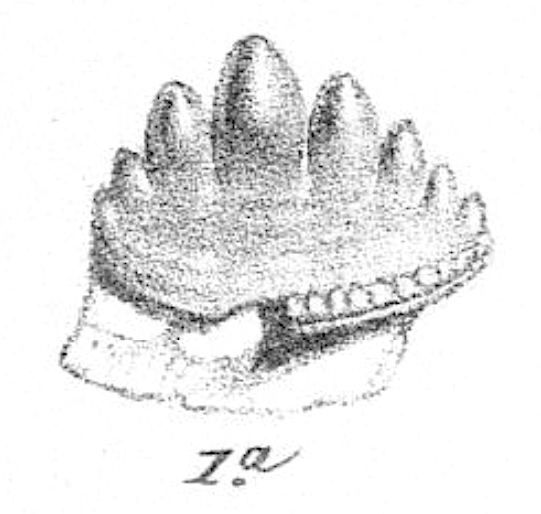
- The holotype tooth of C. apicalis, figured by Louis Agassiz in Recherches sur les poissons fossiles

Scientific classification
- Kingdom: Animalia
- Phylum: Chordata
- Class: Chondrichthyes
- Subclass: Holocephali
- Order: †Petalodontiformes
- Family: †Belantseidae
- Genus: †Ctenoptychius (Agassiz, 1838)

Type species
- Ctenoptychius apicalis

Species synonyms
- C. stevensoni?

= Ctenoptychius =

Extinct genus of cartilaginous fish

Ctenoptychius ('comb-folded', from the Greek κτείς kteís 'comb' and πτυχή ptychos 'fold') is an extinct genus of cartilaginous fish in the order Petalodontiformes. While Ctenoptychius was historically thought to encompass a large number of species with serrated tooth crowns, it is now considered to include only the type species, C. apicalis. This species lived during the Late Carboniferous period, and its fossils are known from the United Kingdom and potentially the United States. C. apicalis is known primarily from teeth, which have a flattened shape and serrated edges, although poorly-preserved specimens preserving the head, pectoral fins and scales of the body are also known. Based on this, it is believed that Ctenoptychius had a flattened, ray-like body.

== Discovery and classification ==
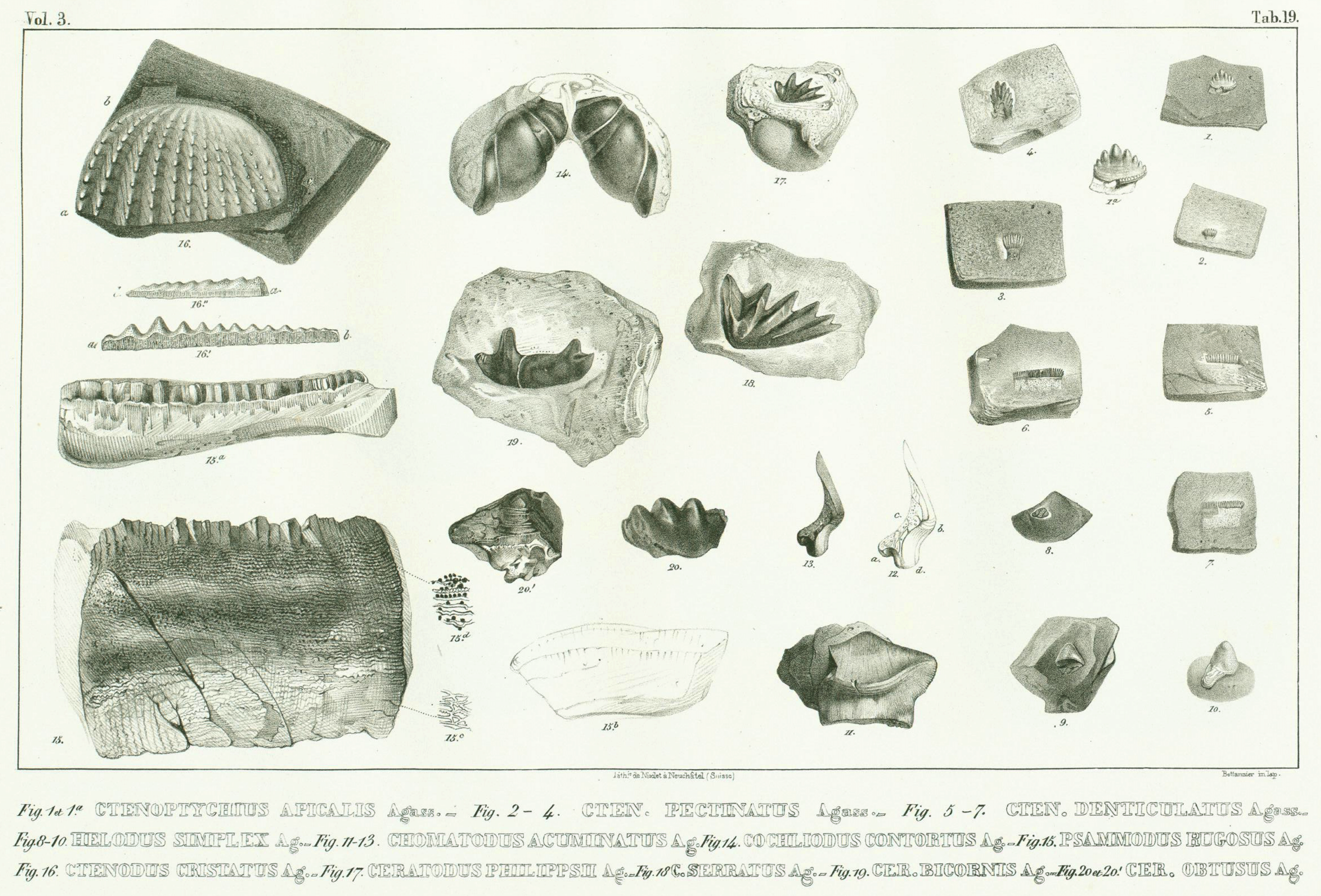
Plate from Recherces sur les poissons fossiles, in which Ctenoptychius was described. Fig. 1 and 1a represent C. apicalis, while fig. 2-7 represent other species then assigned to the genus

Ctenoptychius was named by naturalist Louis Agassiz in his work Recherches sur les poissons fossiles. Agassiz considered the genus to encompass three species: C. apicalis, C. denticulatus, and C. pectinatus, with C. apicalis being the type species. All three species were diagnosed based on isolated teeth from the Carboniferous of England, and were united by the presence of large serrations on the tooth crown. Subsequent authors have assigned additional species based on tooth-like structures with similar serrations, including fossils that have since been identified as the sex organs of the tetrapodomorph Ophiderpeton. Large serrations or cusplets are now known to occur in many unrelated genera of Paleozoic chondrichthyan, only C. apicalis is considered a member of the genus, and other species have been reassigned to different genera or, as in the North American "C. stevensoni", have been regarded as probable synonyms of the type species. The holotype tooth of C. apicalis is now missing.

Articulated body fossils of Ctenoptychius apicalis were described from the North Staffordshire Coalfield in 1890. These preserve the front portion of the body and pectoral fins, the coating of dermal denticles, the cartilaginous jaws, and disarticulated teeth. However, the preservation of this material has been noted as poor, and details of the anatomy are difficult to make out.

The taxon "Ctenoptychius" korni is known from complete, articulated body fossils from the Late Permian-age Kupferschiefer of Germany. This species has variously been assigned to Ctenoptychius and the distantly related genus Janassa, but has alternatively been suggested to belong to neither due to lacking the distinctive features of both genera.

== Description ==
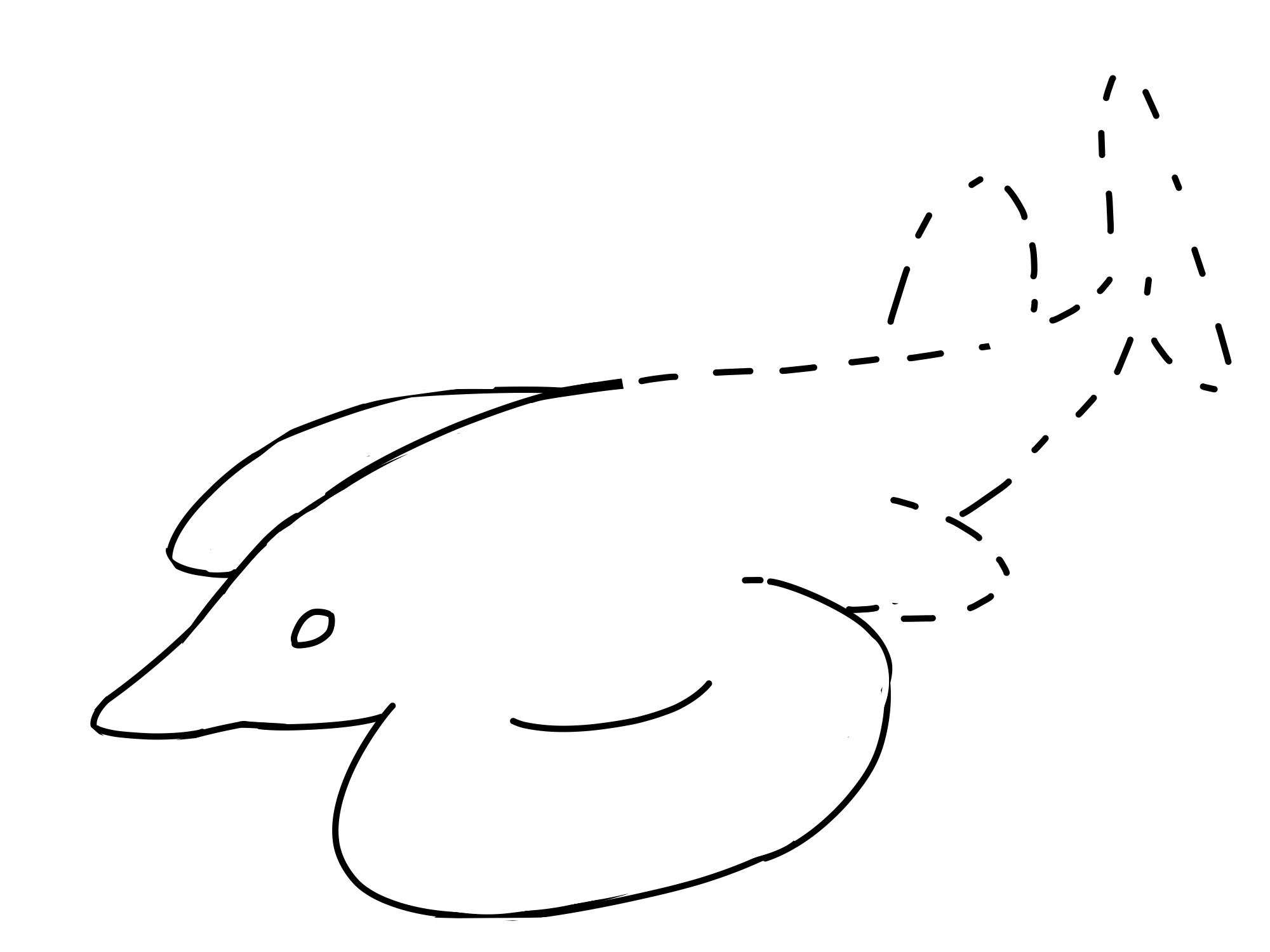
Reconstruction of C. apicalis based on Janassa, which it is assumed to have closely resembled. Unpreserved regions are represented by dashed lines

The tooth crowns of Ctenoptychius apicalis had between three and nine small cusp-like structures termed cusplets, with the centermost being the largest. The root (or base) of the tooth was wide and rounded. The overall shape of the teeth was flattened. In life, the teeth were arranged in multiple tightly packed rows in the upper and lower jaws.

The body of Ctenoptychius was depressiform and the pectoral fins were large and broad. The body shape was similar to a living ray or angelshark, as well as to the distantly related Janassa bituminosa which the head and fins of Ctenoptychius may have closely resembled. Nothing is known about the dorsal fin or pelvic fin anatomy of C. apicalis, but there is no evidence of defensive spines on the dorsal fin. The known portion of the body was coated by dermal denticles, which were most numerous around the head. The anatomy of the denticles is not known in detail.

== Paleoecology ==
Due to its ray-like shape, Ctenoptychius is assumed to have been a bottom-dweller. Petalodont fossils are known primarily from shallow marine environments, and the stomach contents of Janassa imply that at least some members of the group were omnivorous bottom feeders that targeted hard-shelled invertebrates.

== See also ==
- Belantsea, another belantseid petalodont known from body fossils
- List of prehistoric cartilaginous fish genera
