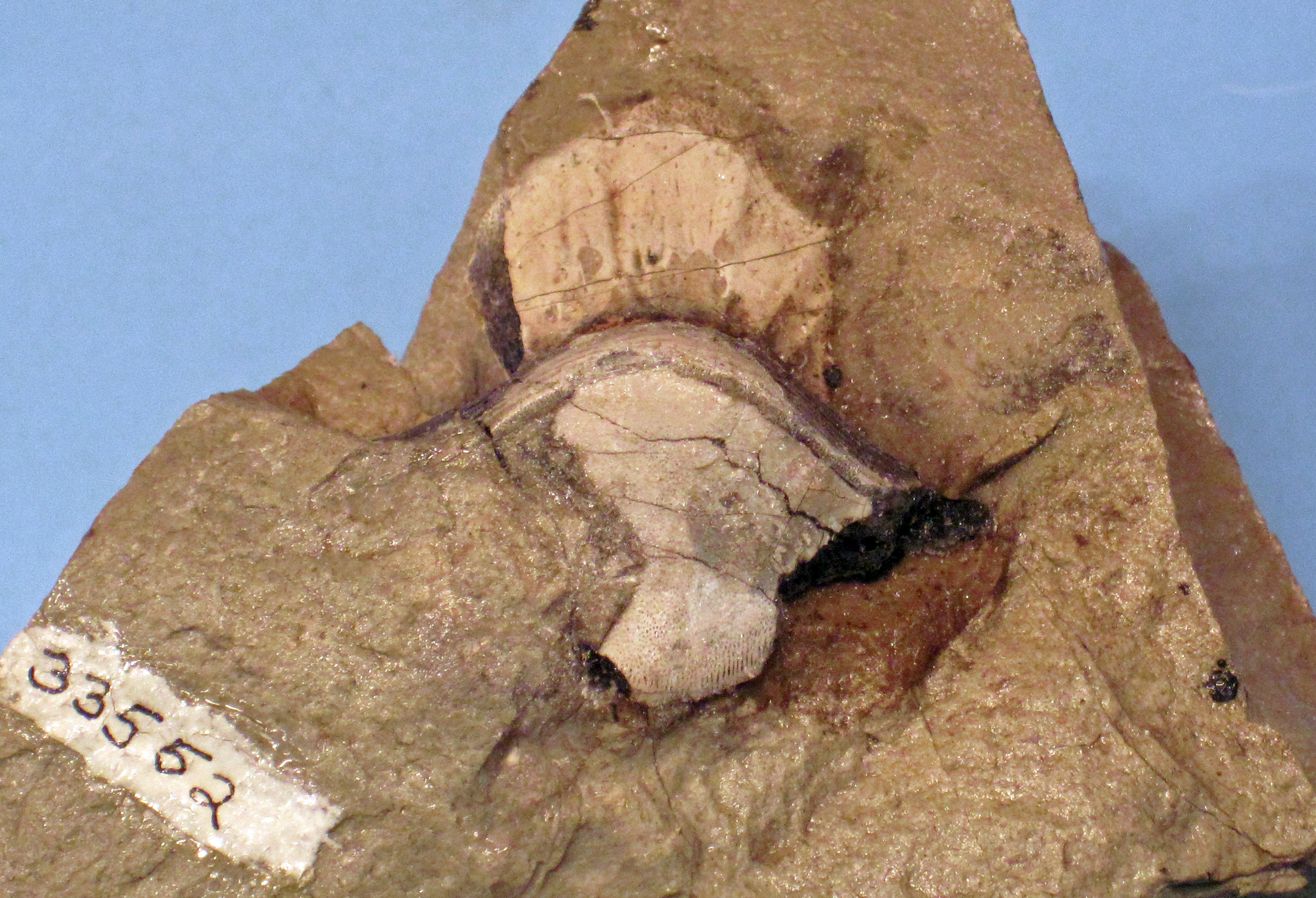
- P. ohioensis tooth

Scientific classification
- Kingdom: Animalia
- Phylum: Chordata
- Class: Chondrichthyes
- Subclass: Holocephali
- Order: †Petalodontiformes
- Family: †Petalodontidae
- Genus: †Petalodus; Owen, 1840

Type species
- †Petalodus hastingsii Owen, 1840

Other species
- †P. acuminatus Agassiz, 1838; †P. allegheniensis Leidy, 1856; †P. arcuatus St. John, 1870; †P. davisii Woodward, 1889; †P. destructor Newberry & Worthen, 1870; †P. flabulella Woodward, 1889; †P. grandis Davis, 1883; †P. jewetti Miller, 1957; †P. luminaries Agassiz, 1838; †P. ohioensis Safford, 1851; †P. sagittatus Agassiz, 1843; †P. securiger? Hay, 1895

Synonyms
- Getalodus Safford, 1853; Sicarius Leidy, 1856

= Petalodus =

Petalodus Temporal range: Pennsylvanian–Permian

Extinct genus of cartilaginous fishes

Petalodus is an extinct genus of cartilaginous fish from the Pennsylvanian to the Permian, known from subtriangular to rhomboidal teeth. The genus was named by Richard Owen in 1840 and the type species is Petalodus hastingsii. The only dubious species within this genus is P. securiger.
