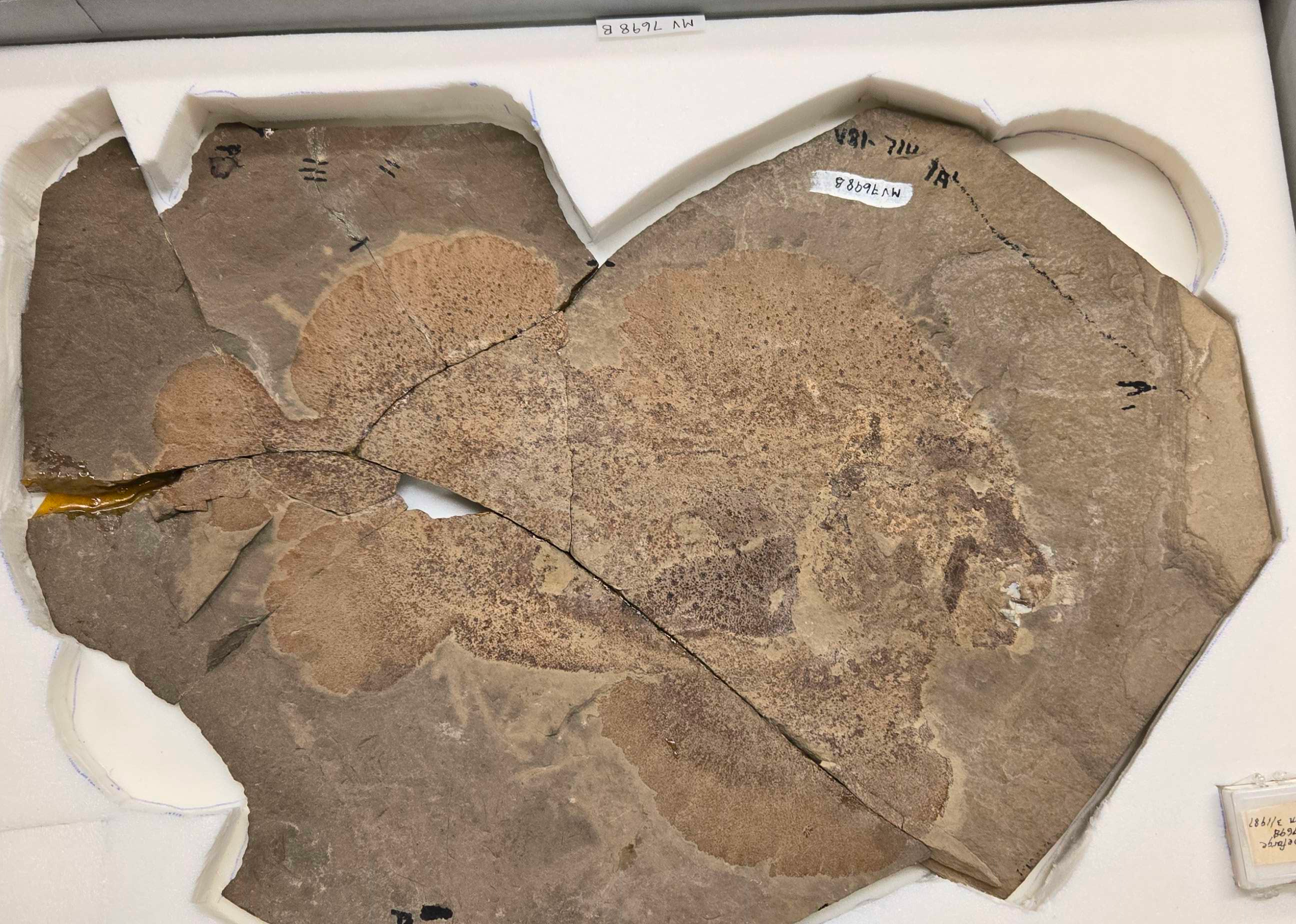
- Holotype of Belantsea montana
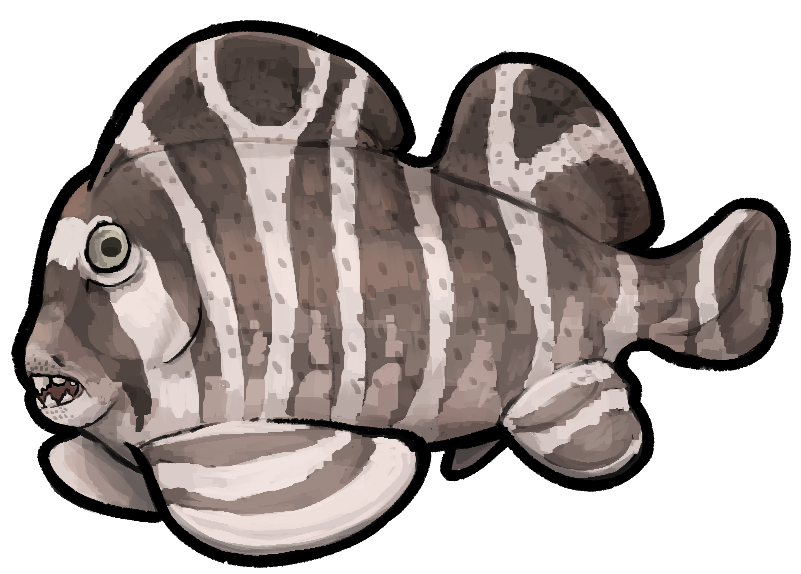
- Life restoration of B. montana

Scientific classification
- Kingdom: Animalia
- Phylum: Chordata
- Class: Chondrichthyes
- Subclass: Holocephali
- Order: †Petalodontiformes
- Family: †Belantseidae
- Genus: †Belantsea; Lund, 1989

Type species
- Belantsea montana Lund, 1989

Species
- Belantsea montana Lund, 1989; Belantsea occidentalis (St. John and Worthen, 1875)

Synonyms
- Ctenopetalus occidentalis St. John and Worthen, 1875

= Belantsea =

Belantsea Temporal range: Lower Carboniferous

Extinct genus of cartilaginous fishes

Belantsea (named after a legendary ancestor of the Crow Tribe) is a genus of extinct petalodontiform cartilaginous fish that lived during the Early Carboniferous. Fossils of Belantsea montana have been found in the Bear Gulch Limestone lagerstätte, and are preserved in exceptional detail. Its body was tall and compressed, with large pectoral fins and a small tail fin. This body plan suggests a lifestyle similar to modern reef fish, and it is thought that Belantsea was adapted for life in reefs of sponges. Its few, large, triangular teeth suggest a diet of hard-shelled marine invertebrates. The genus contains two species, B. montana and B. occidentalis.
