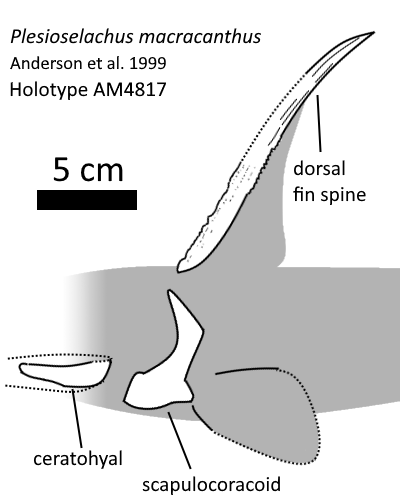
- Interpretation according to Gess and Coates (2015)

Scientific classification
- Kingdom: Animalia
- Phylum: Chordata
- Class: Chondrichthyes
- Genus: †Plesioselachus
- Species: †P. macracanthus

Binomial name
- †Plesioselachus macracanthus Anderson et al. 1999

= Plesioselachus =

Plesioselachus Temporal range: Famennian

Extinct genus of cartilaginous fishes

Plesioselachus is an extinct genus of Late Devonian (Famennian) cartilaginous fish with uncertain classification, which contains only one species, P. macracanthus from the Waterloo Farm lagerstätte in South Africa. Known from a single incomplete articulated skeleton and some isolated remains, it is characterized by having a long dorsal spine with length about one third of body length.

== Description ==
Plesioselachus was originally classified as elasmobranch, however a redescription placed it under Chondrichthyes since it lacks sufficient data to consider what subgroup it belongs to. The holotype specimen, which has a preserved length of 44 centimetres (17 in) shows most of postcranial elements while lacking most of the head. It is originally considered that preserved lower jaw (Meckel’s cartilage) and upper jaw (palatoquadrate), however these materials are more likely to belong to ceratohyal and hyomandibula. The vertebral column is fully preserved, and extends for 31 centimetres (12 in) toward the caudal fin. The packed neural arches are similar to those of symmoriid and stethacanthid holocephalians. The holotype has a 16 centimetres (6.3 in) long dorsal fin spine. It is slightly recurved, and morphologically close to ones of ctenacanth elasmobranchs. Originally, it is considered that dorsal fin have a triangular basal plate, however that material probably belongs to Bothriolepis africana instead. There are no traces of a second dorsal fin or fin spine, nor of an anal fin – such absences might result from incomplete preservation. The caudal fin is incompletely preserved. Plesioselachus is one of the few Devonian chondrichthyan that preserves a pectoral skeleton. The left scapulocoracoid is preserved in the holotype, and some paratype specimen show detailed morphology of its scapulocoracoids. The morphology of scapulocoracoid is comparable with that of symmoriid and stethacanthid holocephalians, except lacking an articular ridge or crest on pectoral radials. Broader proportion from lateral view is also comparable with xenacanthid elasmobranch. The faint impression of a pectoral fin is visible. Pelvic fin and girdle are not preserved, material once considered may belong to phaeophyte axes instead. Simple rhombic scales are visible on the caudal fin, as well as a few on the ventral trunk region. Lack of scales may be a taphonomic artifact, although it is also a common character among early cartilaginous fish.

Some specimens, such as 22.5 centimetres (8.9 in) long isolated fin spine, show Plesioselachus could grow larger than the holotype specimen, up to 1 metre (3.3 ft).
