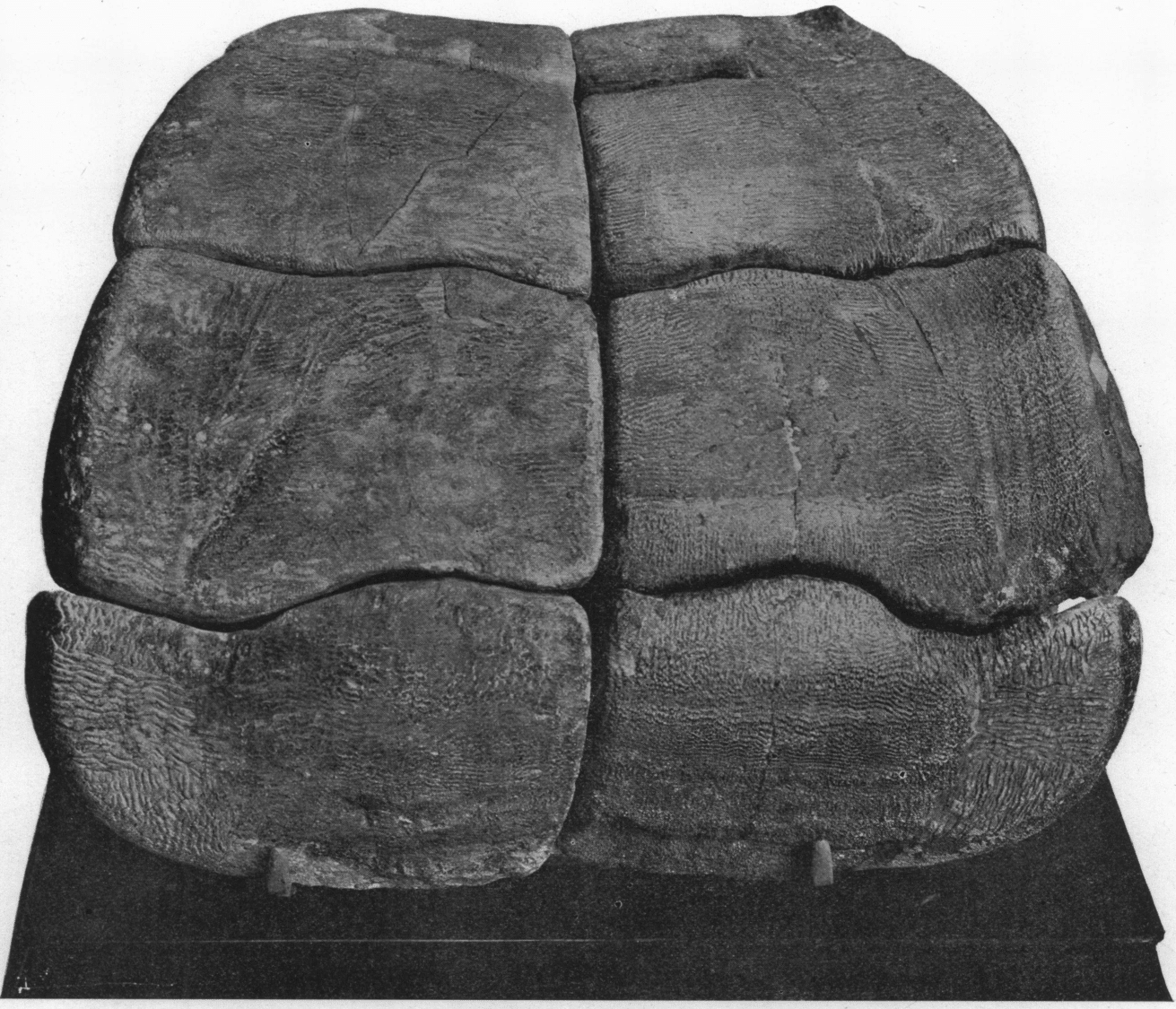
- Reconstructed tooth-plates of Psammodus (formerly classified as the genus Archaeobatis)
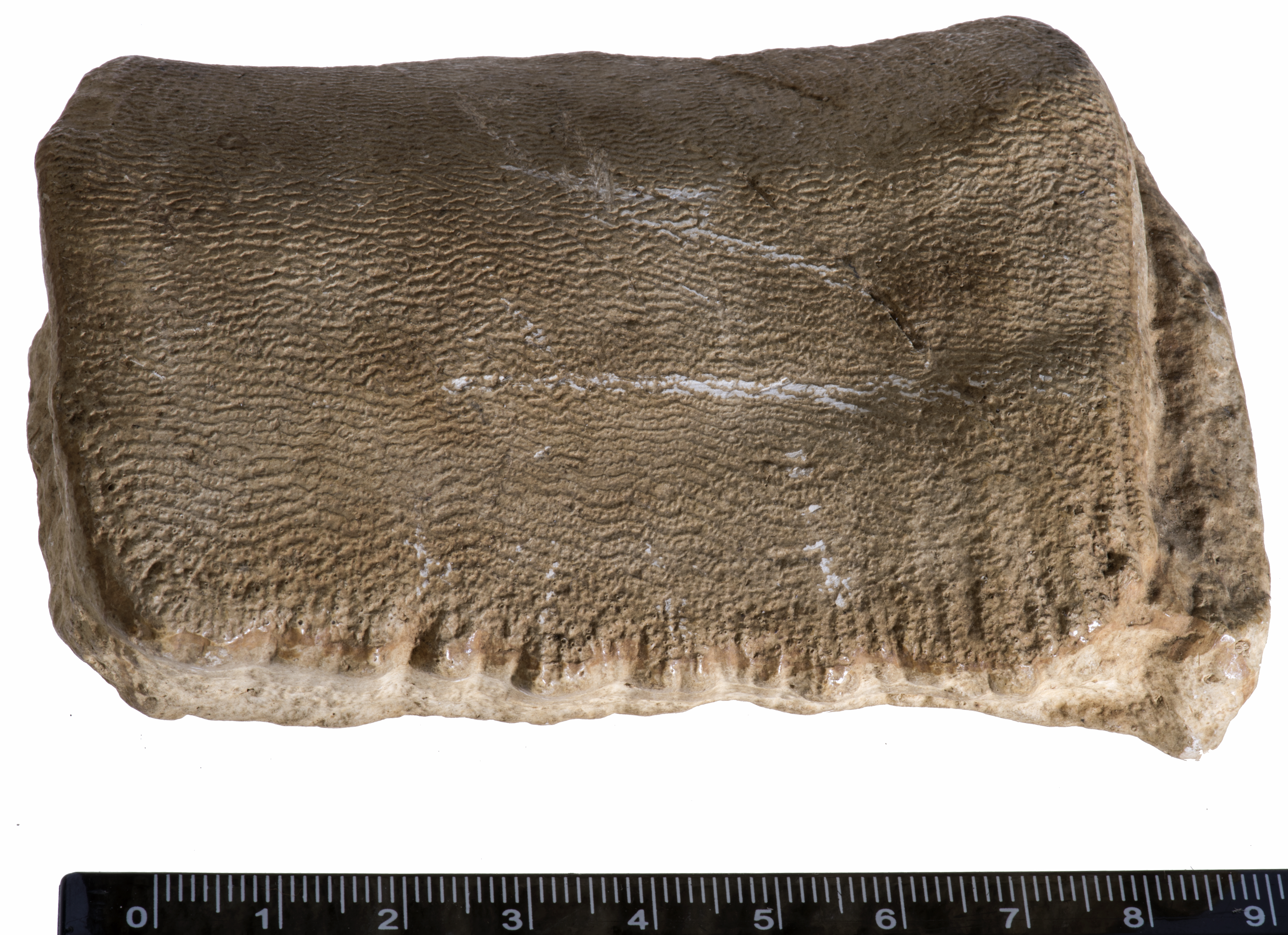
- Isolated tooth-plate of Psammodus

Scientific classification
- Kingdom: Animalia
- Phylum: Chordata
- Class: Chondrichthyes
- Subclass: Holocephali
- Order: †Psammodontiformes; Obruchev, 1953
- Family: †Psammodontidae de Koninck, 1878
- Genus: †Psammodus; Agassiz, 1838

Type species
- Psammodus rugosus Agassiz, 1838

Synonyms
- Archaeobatis Newberry, 1878; Astrabatis Davis, 1884; Homalodus Davis, 1883

= Psammodus =

Psammodus Temporal range: Latest Devonian–Mississippian

Extinct genus of cartilaginous fish

Psammodus is an extinct genus of cartilaginous fish known from the Late Devonian to the Early Carboniferous period. It is the only member of the family Psammodontidae and the order Psammodontiformes, although other genera have been classified in these groups in the past. Psammodus were durophagous carnivores.

== Research history and classification ==
Fossils of the genus Psammodus were first described and named by naturalist Louis Agassiz.

Psammodus is the type genus of the family Psammodontidae and the order Psammodontiformes. The name Psammodontidae was first coined by paleontologist Laurent-Guillaume de Koninck in 1878 to include Psammodus and the genus Helodus, although the family "Psammodonten" was already named by biologist Christian Heinrich Pander in 1856. Because "Psammodonten" is not latinized it is considered an invalid taxon, and Psammodontidae is the name used for the family. In a 1953 publication, Dmitry Obruchev established the monotypic order Psammodontiformes to include Psammodontidae, as he considered it preferable to use order-level taxonomy for extinct cartilaginous fish groups. Obruchev himself later sank Psammodontidae into the order Bradyodonti in 1964, but other authors have continued to separate various "bradyodonts", including the psammodonts, into their own orders.

Additional genera were named and considered relatives of Psammodus by later authors, such as the junior synonyms Archaeobatis, Homalodus and Astrabodus. Of these genera, Lagarodus is still considered valid and was traditionally classified as part of Psammodontidae and Psammodontiformes, but it has been reclassified as a member of the family Lagarodontidae, and is no longer classified as part of a specific order.

== Description ==
Psammodus are known primarily from their plate-like teeth. These teeth are broad and flat, and often appear rectangular or triangular. In life the teeth were tightly packed together in the jaws.

A partial skull of Psammodus is known, which has not been described in detail.

== Paleobiology ==
Psammodus tooth plates are adapted for durophagy, and members of the genus likely had similar diets to living chimaeras consisting of small benthic invertebrates with hard shells and occasional small fish. Food was likely ground between the upper and lower tooth plates, rather than being crushed. The evolution of Psammodus during the Devonian and Carboniferous coincided with a diversification of hard-shelled invertebrates and other durophagous cartilaginous fishes, which likely resulted from a predator-prey arms race.
