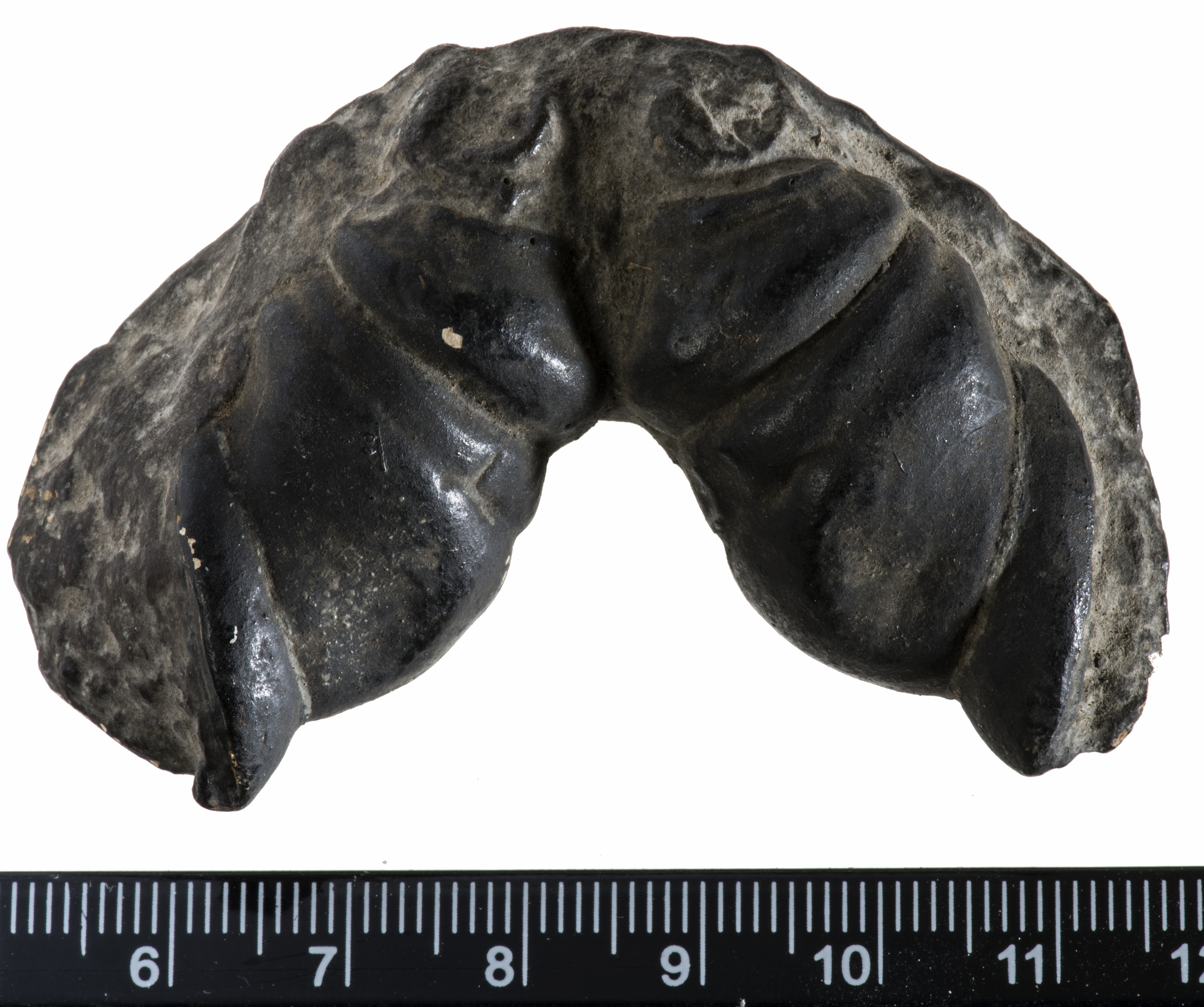
- Preserved dentition of Cochliodus

Scientific classification
- Kingdom: Animalia
- Phylum: Chordata
- Class: Chondrichthyes
- Subclass: Holocephali
- Superorder: Holocephalimorpha
- Order: †Cochliodontiformes; Obruchev, 1953

Type genus
- Cochliodus Agassiz, 1838

Families and genera
- †Cochliodontidae; †Psephodontidae; †Solenodus

= Cochliodontiformes =

Cochliodontiformes Temporal range: Late Devonian to Late Permian

Extinct order of cartilaginous fishes

Cochliodontiformes are an order of extinct holocephalans (historically referred to as bradyodonts) known from the Devonian, Carboniferous and Permian periods. Members of the order are believed to be durophagous benthic carnivores.
