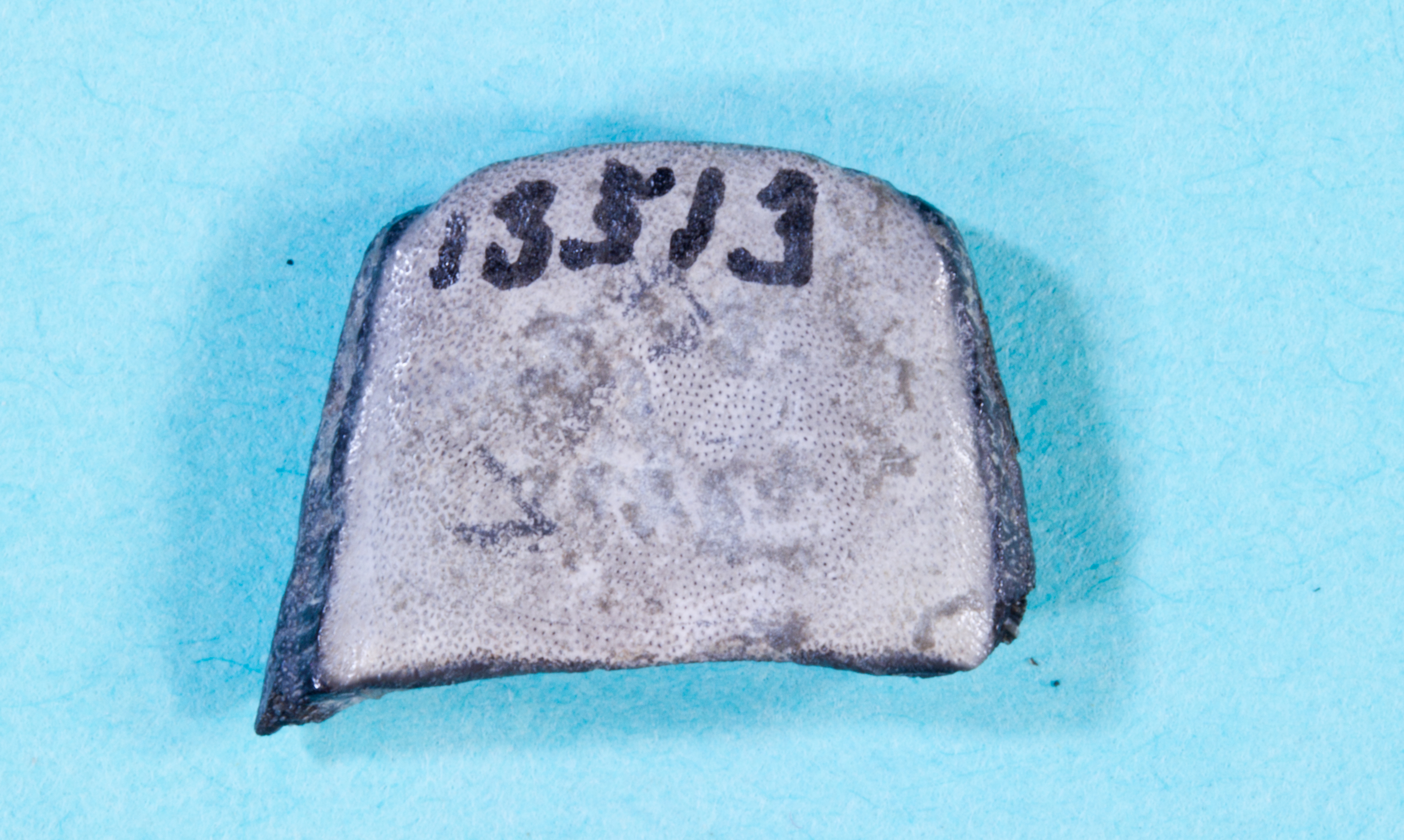
- Tooth plate of Copodus vanhorni from the St. Louis Limestone

Scientific classification
- Kingdom: Animalia
- Phylum: Chordata
- Class: Chondrichthyes
- Subclass: Holocephali
- Order: †Copodontiformes; Obruchev. 1953
- Family: †Copodontidae; Davis, 1883

Type genus
- Copodus Morris and Roberts, 1862

Type species
- Psammodus cornatus Davis, 1843

Genera
- †Acmoniodus; †Copodus; †Melanodus; †Dimyleus?; †Mazodus?; †Synthetodus?

= Copodontidae =

Copodontidae Temporal range: Middle Devonian–Permian

Extinct family of cartilaginous fishes

Copodontidae is an extinct family of cartilaginous fish known from the Devonian, Carboniferous and Permian periods. It is the only family of the order Copodontiformes. The order and family are named for the type genus, Copodus.

== Research history and classification ==
The family Copodontidae was named by James William Davis in 1882 and included the genera Copodus and Dimyleus, with Copodus as the type genus. These genera had been known previously, but were considered members of the family Psammodontidae before being split into their own family by Davis. In a 1953 paper, Dmitry Obruchev created the monotypic order Copodontiformes to include Copodontidae.

In a 1999 review, researcher Barbara Stahl classified Acmoniodus along with Copodus as members of the family. She considered Dimyleus, Mazodus, and Synthetodus to be members of Copodontiformes, but of uncertain relationships. In 2008 a new genus from the Middle Devonian, named Melanodus, was assigned to Copodontidae due to its apparent similarities with Synthetodus.

=== Taxonomy ===
Copodonts are cartilaginous fish belonging to the subclass Holocephali, which also includes the living chimaeras.

== Description ==
Copodonts are known exclusively from tooth plates. These tooth plates are broad and rectangular, with flattened edges. Singular upper and lower plates are sometimes found in close association (although have never been found articulated), and it is thought that copodonts had only a single upper and lower tooth plate in each jaw which grew continuously. The plates were covered by a layer of enameloid which was worn off over the course of the animal's life.

== Paleobiology ==
The anatomy of copodont tooth plates was similar to those of modern eagle rays, and they likely had a similar function. In life, the copodonts were predators with a durophagous diet, and likely fed on shelled prey such as mollusks. The group's evolution during the Devonian and Carboniferous periods coincided with a diversification of hard-shelled marine invertebrates, likely driven by a predator-prey arms race.
