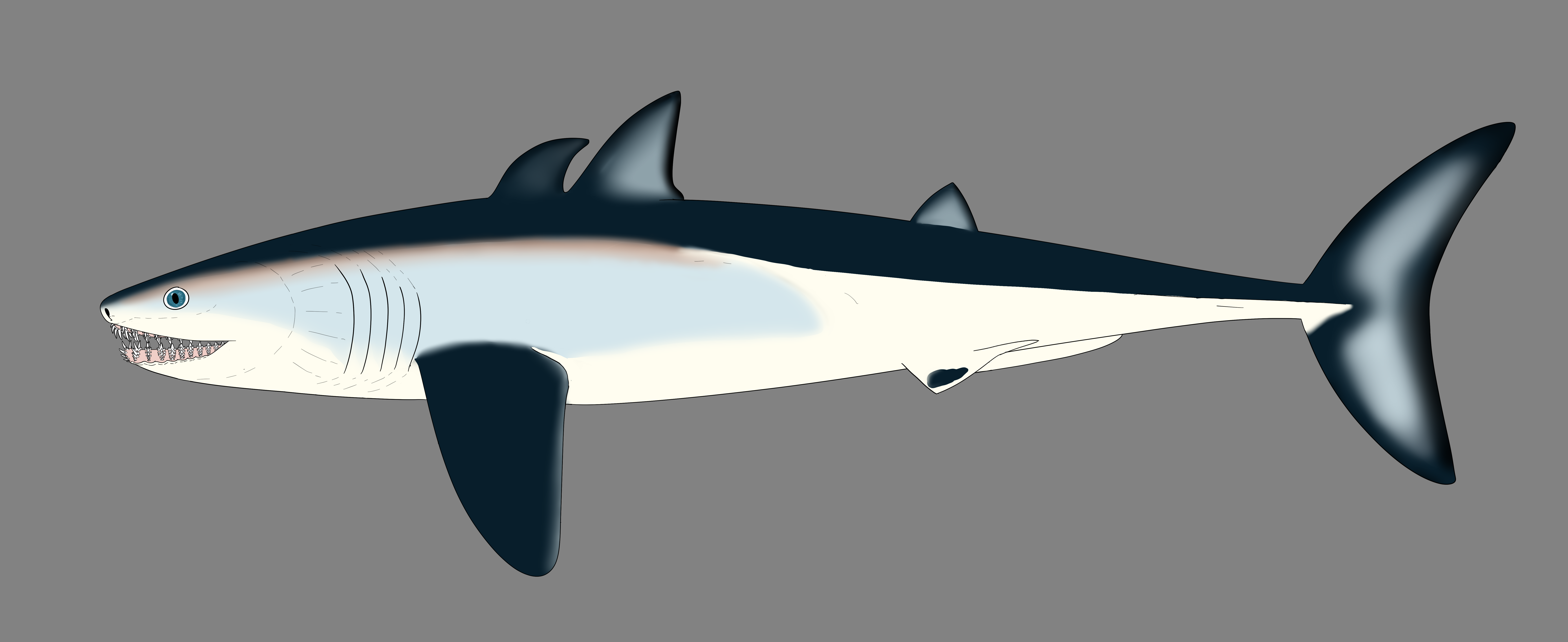
- A reconstruction of Cladoselache
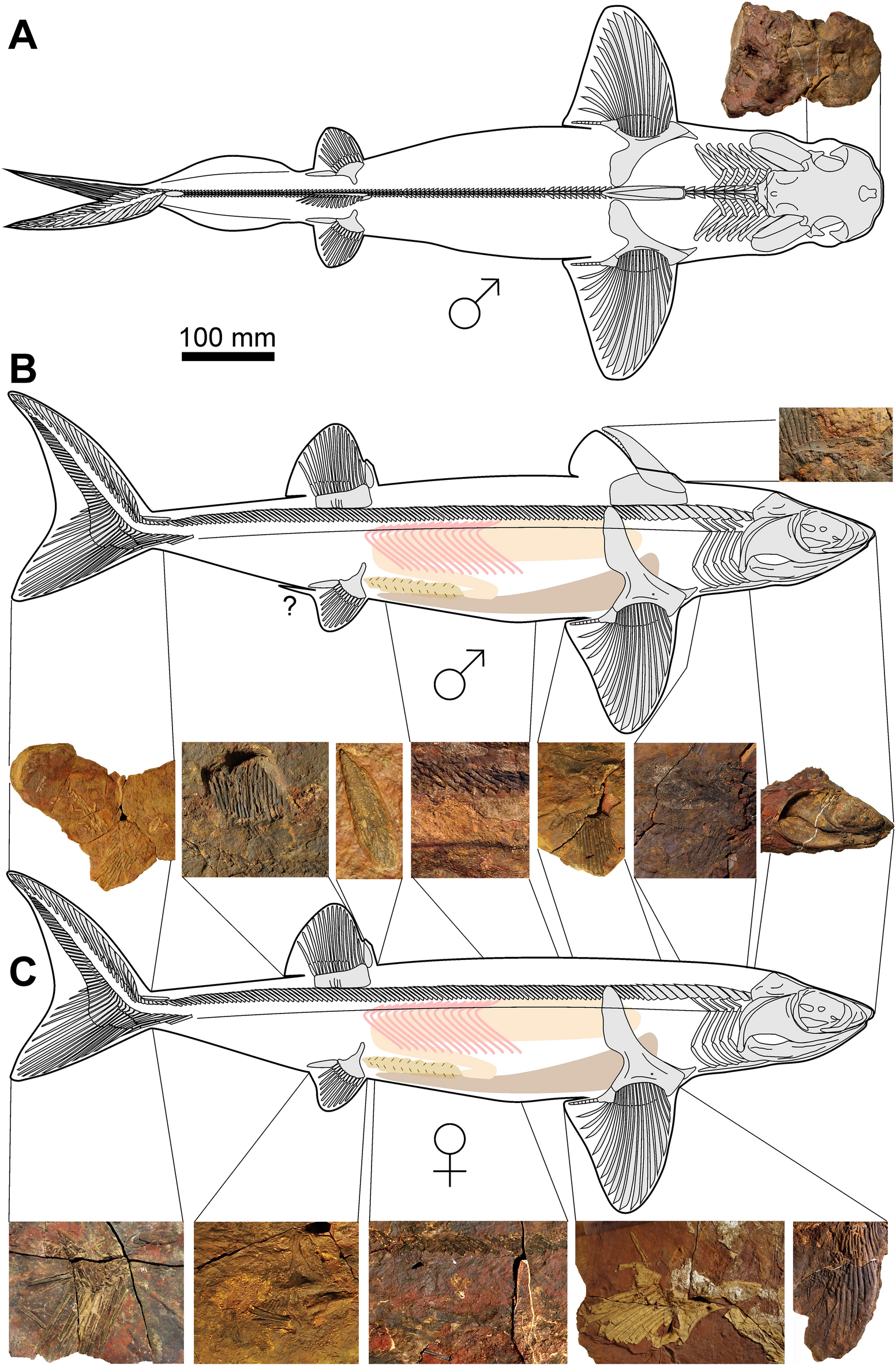
- Diagram of Maghriboselache

Scientific classification
- Kingdom: Animalia
- Phylum: Chordata
- Clade: Eugnathostomata
- Class: Chondrichthyes
- Subclass: Holocephali
- Order: †Cladoselachiformes
- Family: †Cladoselachidae; Dean, 1894

Genera
- Cladoselache; Maghriboselache

= Cladoselachidae =

Cladoselachidae Temporal range: Late Devonian

Extinct family of cartilaginous fishes

Cladoselachidae is an extinct family of cartilaginous fishes closely related to, and possibly nested within, Symmoriiformes. They are characterized by having an elongated body with a spine in each of the two dorsal fins.
