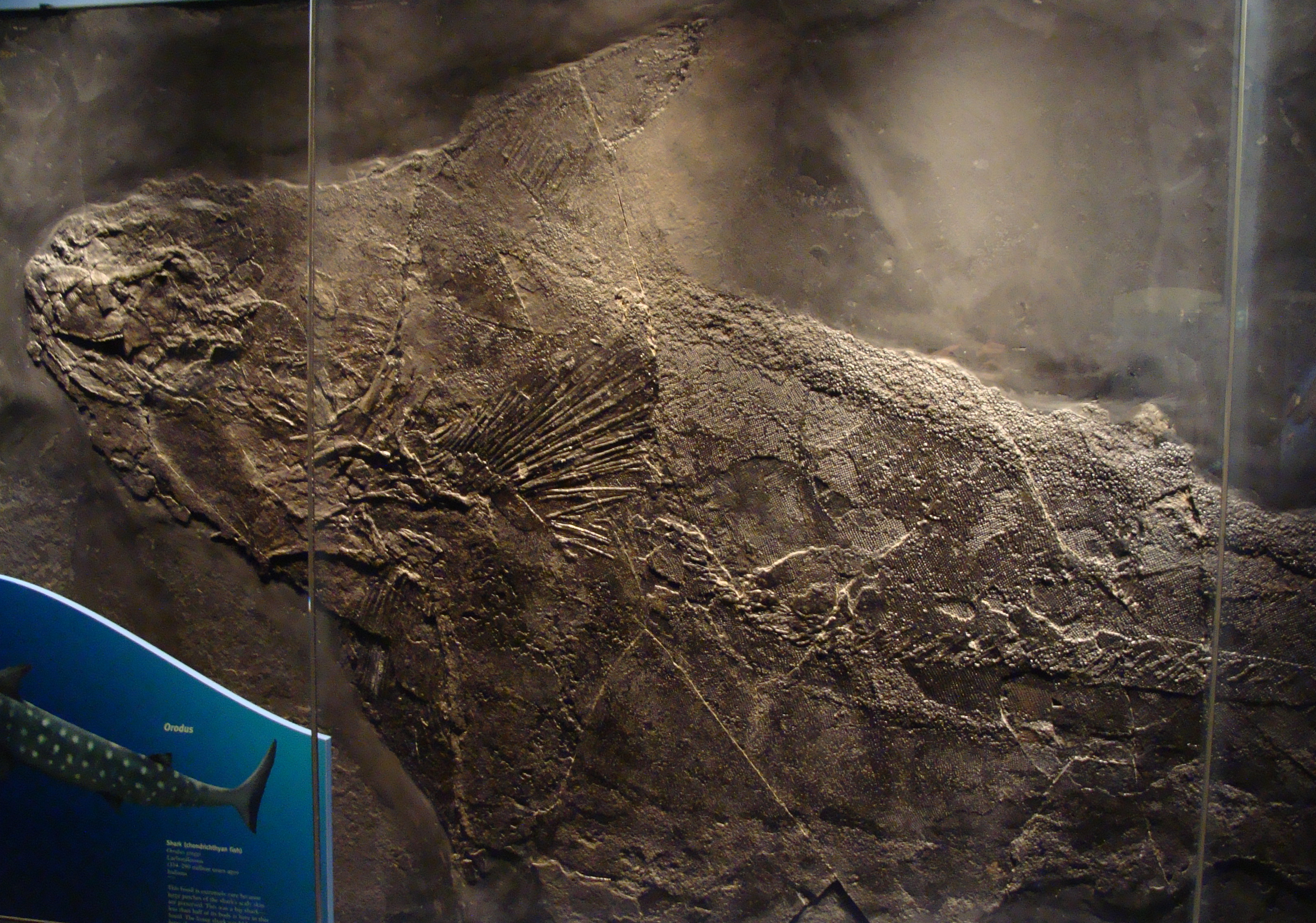
- Fossil of Orodus greggi
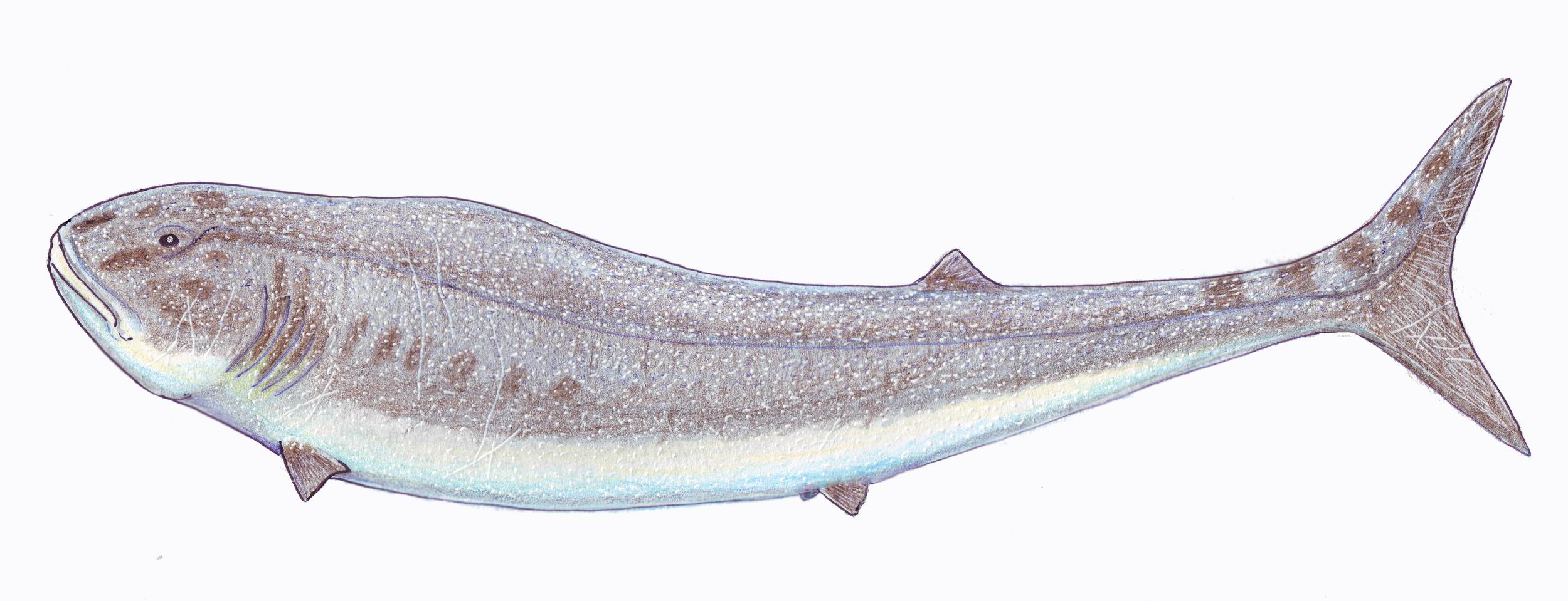
- Life restoration of Orodus cf. micropterygius

Scientific classification
- Kingdom: Animalia
- Phylum: Chordata
- Class: Chondrichthyes
- Subclass: Holocephali
- Order: †Orodontiformes; Zangerl, 1981

= Orodontiformes =

Orodontiformes Temporal range: Late Devonian–Late Carboniferous

Extinct order of cartilaginous fishes

Orodontiformes is an extinct group of cartilaginous fish, known from the Late Devonian and Carboniferous periods. They are part of Euchondrocephali (Holocephali sensu lato), making their closest living relatives chimaeras. Most members are only known from teeth, which are low and rounded, and designed for crushing prey (durophagy). The group in its totality has been described as "undoubtedly artificial" (i.e. non-monophyletic). Several species of Orodus are known from specimens preserving the body as well as the teeth.

== Description ==
According to Ginter et al 2010, the teeth of Orodontiformes are distinguished by the following features:

euselachiantype bases; a low, usually pyramidal or conical median cusp; lateral cusps which are completely fused or with separate tips; the position of at least a few cusps before fusion distinguishable by the relative thickness of the crown or the pattern of ornamentation; the crown at least partly built of tubular dentine.

The only known members of the Orodontiformes known from skeletal material are two species of Orodus, Orodus greggi and Orodus micropterygius from the Carboniferous of North America. These specimens (which are around 2 and 1 metre (6.6 and 3.3 ft) long for O. greggi and O. micropterygius respectively) have very small pectoral fins, and lack fin spines on their dorsal fins. They also demonstrate that the morphology of the teeth varied somewhat by position in the mouth (heterodonty).

== Taxonomy ==
Ginter et al. 2010 divided up Orodontiformes into two families, Orodontidae, and Leiodontidae, the latter being distinguished from the former by lacking ornamentation on the tooth crown (with ridges being present on the crowns of orodontid teeth), and a typically pointed median cusp.

- Family Orodontidae De Koninck 1878
  - Orodus Agassiz, 1838
- Leiodontidae Ginter et al. 2010
  - Leiodus St.John & Worthen. 1875
  - Cristatodens Ginter & Sun 2007
