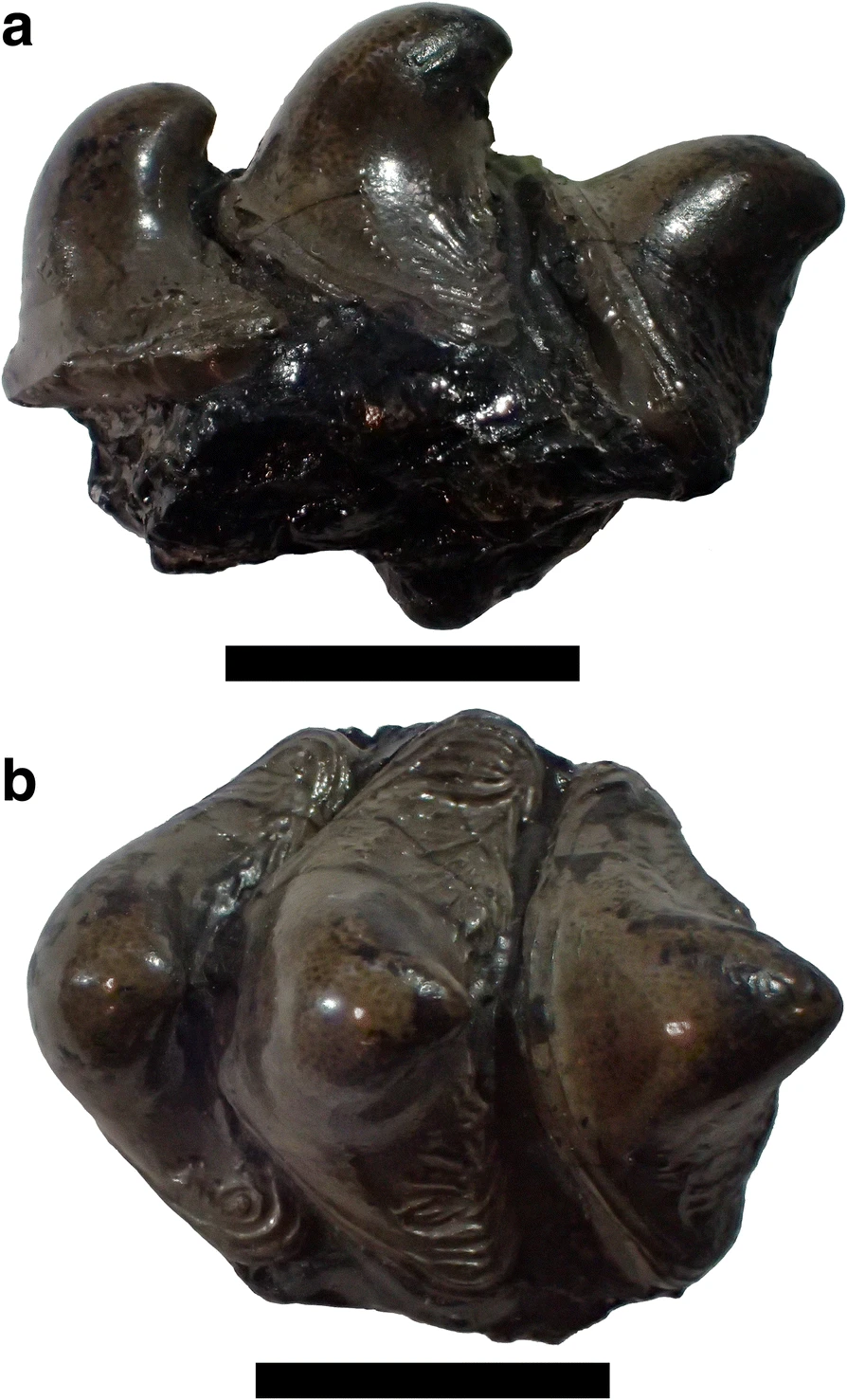
- Tooth whorl of Helodus simplex

Scientific classification
- Kingdom: Animalia
- Phylum: Chordata
- Class: Chondrichthyes
- Subclass: Holocephali
- Order: †Helodontiformes
- Family: †Helodontidae
- Genus: †Helodus; Agassiz, 1838

Type species
- Helodus simplex Agassiz, 1838

Species
- See text

Synonyms
- Diclitodus Davis, 1883; Pleurodus Hancock & Atthey, 1872; Pleuroplax Woodward, 1889

= Helodus =

Helodus Temporal range: Moscovian

Extinct genus of cartilaginous fish

Helodus (from Greek: ἧλος helos, 'stud' and Greek: ὀδούς odoús 'tooth') is an extinct genus of cartilaginous fish, with fossils belonging to the genus identified from the Late Devonian to the Early Permian periods. While the type species, H. simplex from the Late Carboniferous (Moscovian ~ 315 million years ago) of England is known from articulated specimens, all other Helodus species are known only from isolated teeth. Over 70 species have been attributed to this genus based on these indistinct bead-like teeth, which likely belong to many different unrelated groups of fish in the subclass Holocephali. This makes Helodus as broadly defined a wastebasket taxon, and only the type species can be confidently attributed to this genus. The genus is the sole member of the family Helodontidae and the order Helodontiformes.

Helodus simplex grew to around 45 centimeters (1.48 ft) in body length, and males had a large, tooth-bearing clasping organ on their heads. The teeth of H. simplex, some of which were arranged in tooth whorls, were transitional between separated elasmobranch-like teeth and the tooth plates of living chimaeras.

== Discovery and naming ==
The genus Helodus was named by naturalist Louis Agassiz in 1838 to refer to isolated bead-like teeth from the late Paleozoic. A fossil preserving the scales and cartilaginous skeleton of H. simplex, which is housed at the Hunterian Museum and Art Gallery, was described in 1890 by James William Davis. This specimen originated from Staffordshire, England and was found in an ironstone mine. This same locality, termed the Knowles Ironstone, also preserved several more complete specimens which are now housed in the Natural History Museum, London. Two other cartilaginous fish tooth morphologies, originally named as the genera Diclitodus and Pleuroplax (sometimes Pleurodus), are now known to belong to the same animal as Helodus simplex because of these skeletal remains.

The genus name translates to 'stud-toothed' and is derived from the Greek: ἧλος or helos, (meaning 'stud'), and Greek: ὀδούς or odoús, meaning 'tooth'.

== Description ==
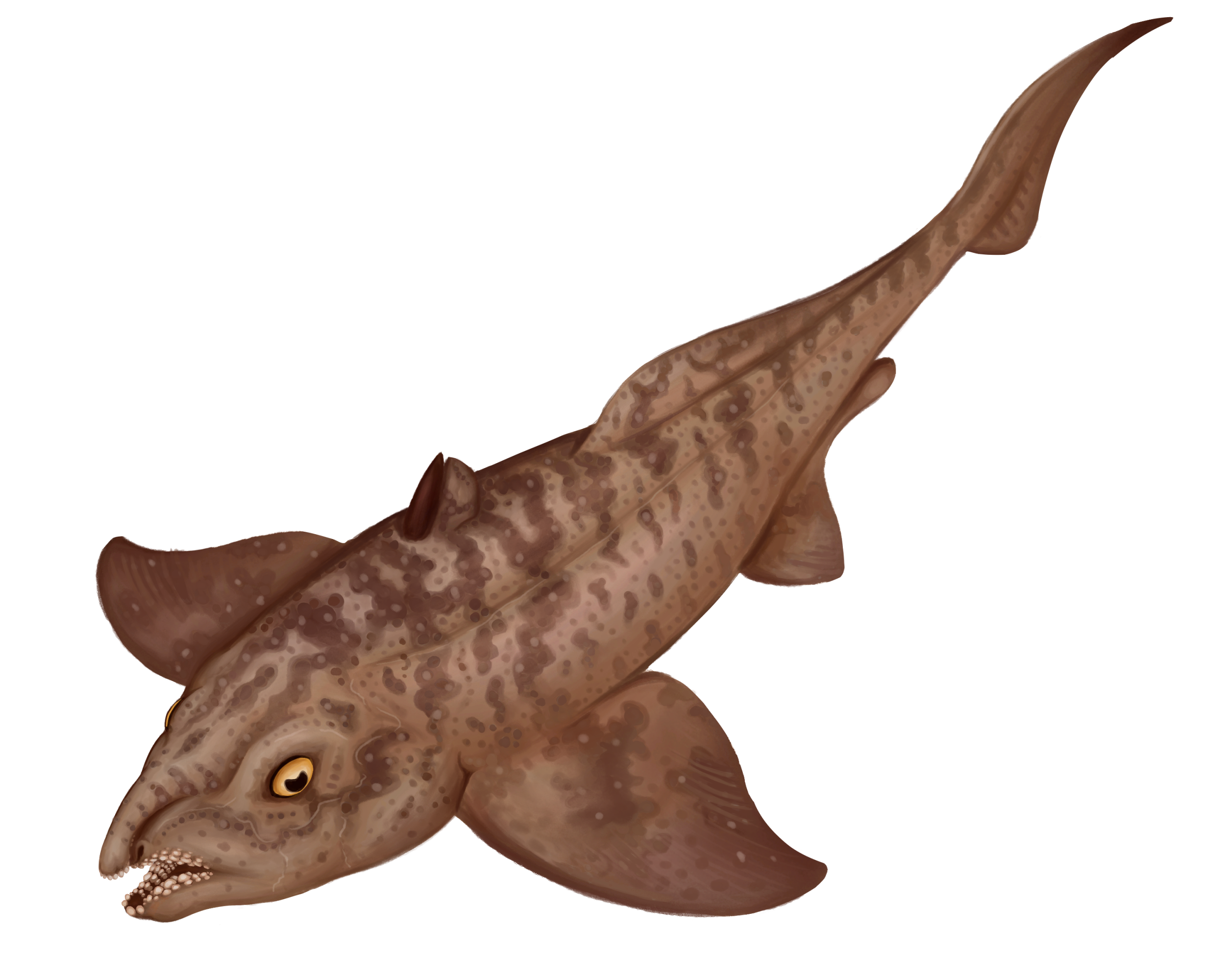
Life restoration of Helodus simplex with hypothetical banded patterning

Helodus simplex is known from multiple incomplete, articulated specimens preserving teeth in their in-life arrangement, portions of the cartilaginous skeleton, patches of small scales called dermal denticles, and the soft tissue impressions of fins. Accounting for all known individuals, the skeleton of the species is completely known. The largest known Helodus simplex were around 45 centimeters (1.48 ft) in total length.

=== Endoskeleton ===
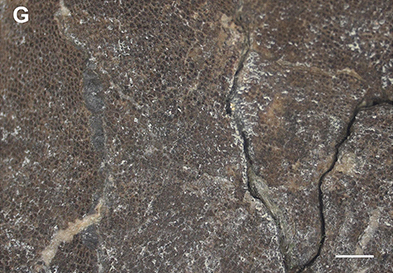
Closeup of cartilage on the skull of H. simplex, showing the mineralized prisms

The endoskeleton of Helodus was made up of cartilage. This cartilage was strengthened by an outer layer of mineralized tessellations similar to in living sharks and rays, although in Helodus the structures were more irregular and variable in shape.

The fins of Helodus were supported by fibers called ceratotrichia. While paleontologist Arthur Smith Woodward suggested the genus had an anal fin, subsequent research by James Alan Moy-Thomas found no evidence of this. Later works have identified two dorsal fins, pectoral and pelvic fins, and a heterocercal caudal fin.

=== Teeth ===
Teeth were present in rows both inside the jaws and on the large prepelvic clasper present on top of the head.

=== Dermal denticles and fin spine ===
The body of Helodus was covered in small dermal denticles.

The first dorsal fin had a short, smooth fin spine emerging from it, which was supported by the synarcual. This spine was made up of osteodentin.

== Classification and species ==
Helodus is the sole member of the order Helodontiformes and the family Helodontidae. It is a member of the class Chondrichthyes and the subclass Holocephali, which also includes living chimaeras. Michael Coates and coauthors have tentatively suggested that the genus may be related to the order Eugeneodontiformes due to similarities in their teeth, although they cautioned that further studies are needed to confirm this.

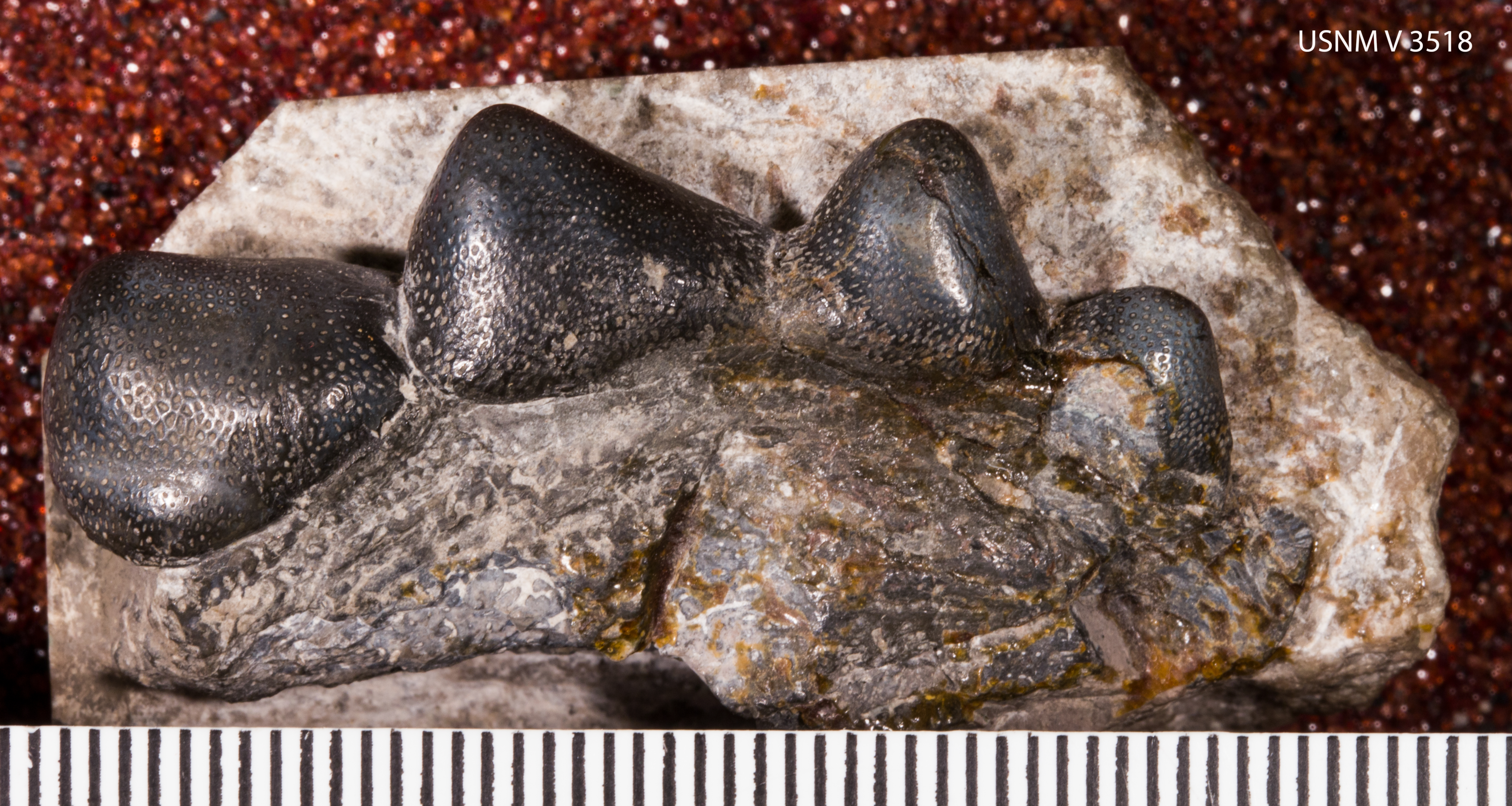
Type specimen of Rotuladens coxanus, which was originally classified as a species of Helodus

Over 70 species have been classified in the genus Helodus, which range in age from the Late Devonian to the Permian and have been found around the world. With the exception of the type species, these are based only on teeth, and are typically similar to those of Helodus simplex only in their approximate shape. They likely came from a variety of cartilaginous fish, some of which are only very distantly related to one another, and thus some authors limit the genus to only include H. simplex. Some of these former species, such as "Helodus" coxanus from the Keukuk Limestone, have subsequently been assigned to their own genera. Similarities in tooth histology between H. simplex and the assigned species H. appendiculatus may indicate a close relation between these two particular species.

== Paleobiology and paleoecology ==
The ironstones that preserve Helodus simplex were formed in a shallow freshwater environment.
