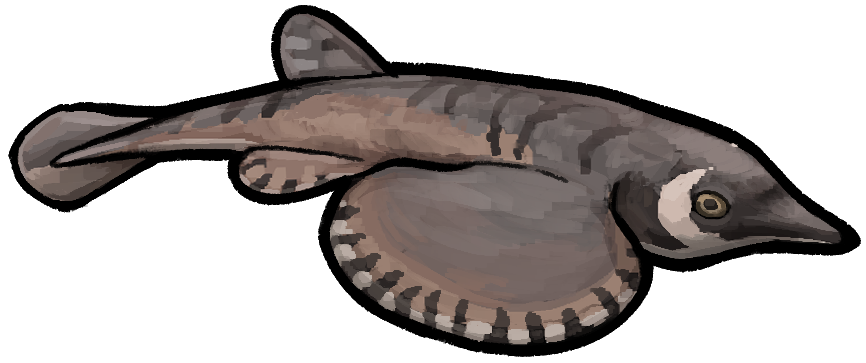
- Life restoration of Janassa bituminosa
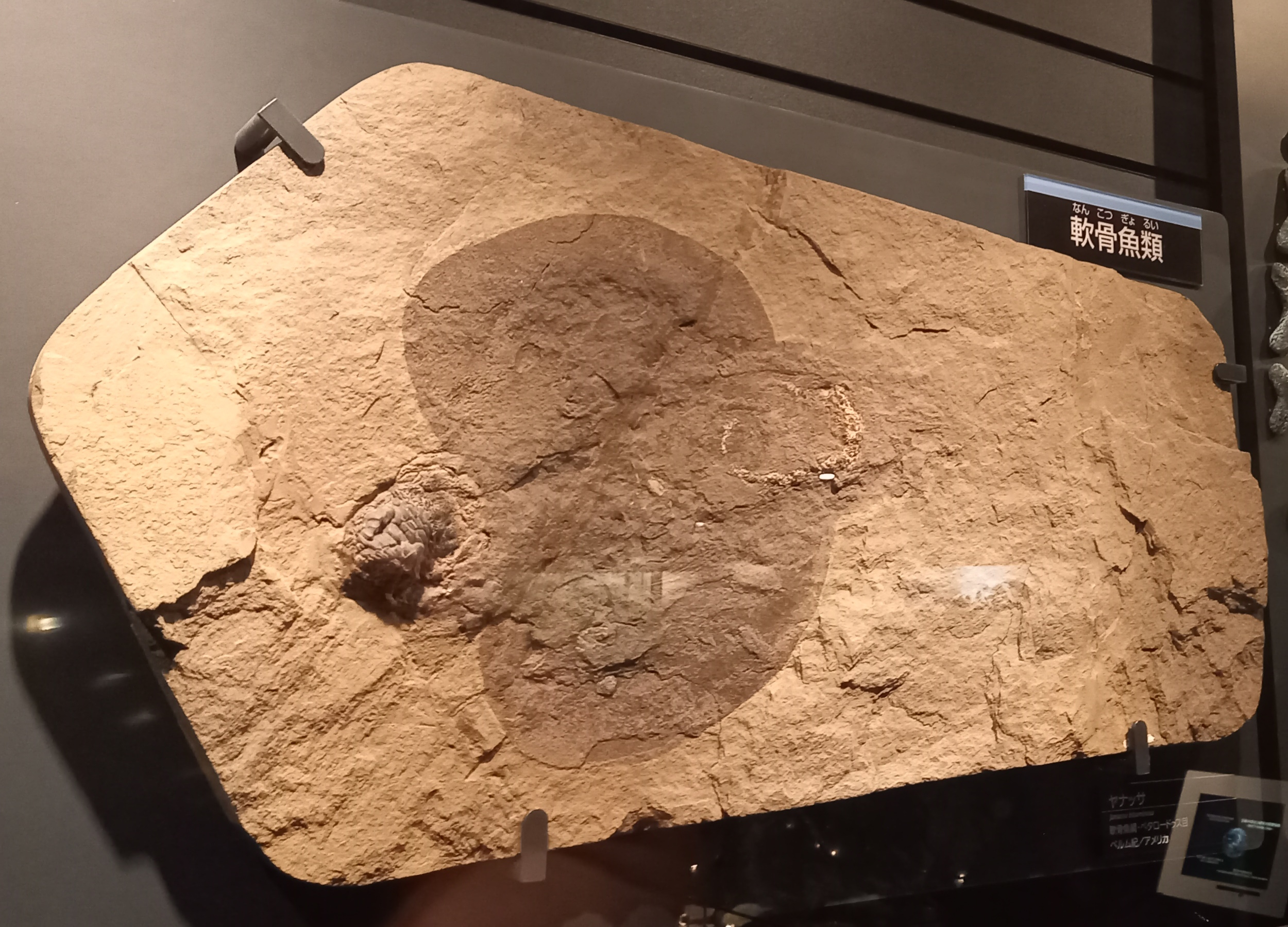
- Fossil displayed at the National Museum of Nature and Science

Scientific classification
- Kingdom: Animalia
- Phylum: Chordata
- Class: Chondrichthyes
- Subclass: Holocephali
- Order: †Petalodontiformes
- Family: †Janassidae
- Genus: †Janassa; Schlotheim, 1820

Species
- J. bituminosa (Schlotheim, 1820) (type species); J. clavata M'Coy, 1855; J. kochi Nielsen, 1932; J. clarki Lund, 1989; J. unguicula (Eastman, 1903)

= Janassa =

Janassa Temporal range: Lower Carboniferous to Lopingian

Extinct genus of cartilaginous fishes

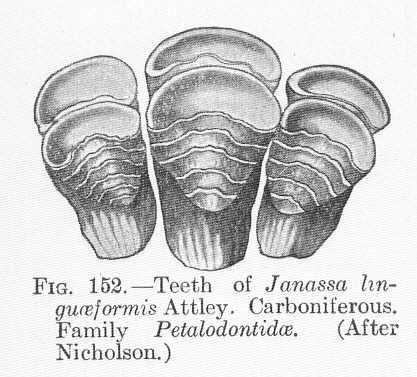
Teeth of Janassa

Janassa is an extinct genus of petalodont cartilaginous fish that lived in marine environments in what is now central United States of America and Europe during the Carboniferous and upper Permian.

It is known from teeth and a few poorly preserved body fossils from Germany (Kupferschiefer, Upper Permian) and England (Marl Slate, Upper Permian).

Janassa had a body plan very similar to that of the modern skate. Its teeth suggest it crushed and ate shellfish, such as brachiopods.
