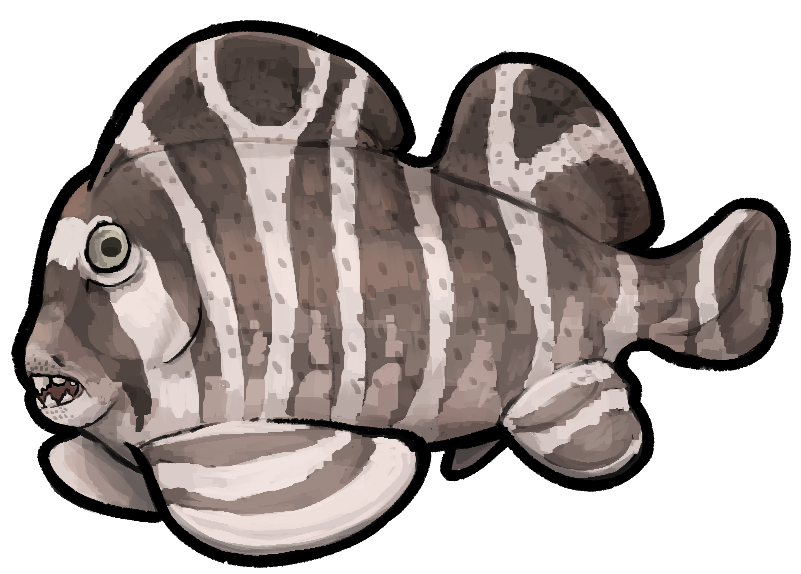
- Belantsea montana
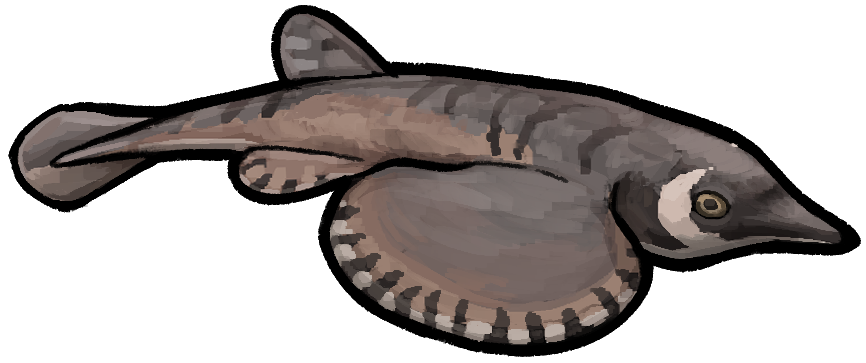
- Janassa bituminosa

Scientific classification
- Kingdom: Animalia
- Phylum: Chordata
- Class: Chondrichthyes
- Subclass: Holocephali
- Order: †Petalodontiformes; Zangerl, 1981

Families
- Janassidae; Pristodontidae; Petalodontidae; Belantseidae

= Petalodontiformes =

Petalodontiformes Temporal range: Lower Carboniferous–Permian

Extinct order of cartilaginous fishes

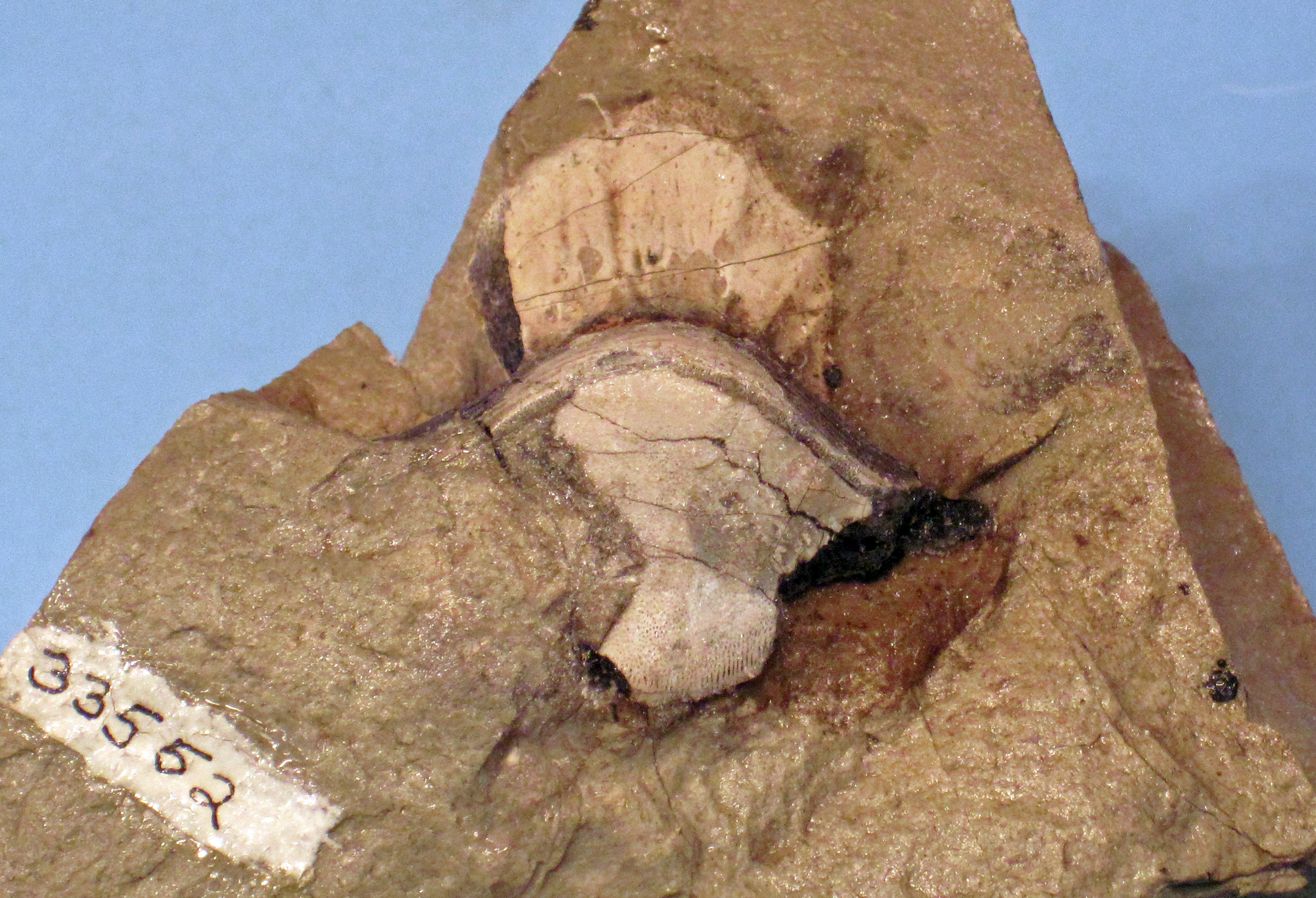
Teeth of Petalodus ohioensis

Petalodontiformes ("thin-plate teeth") is an extinct order of marine cartilaginous fish related to modern day chimaera found in what is now the United States of America and Europe.

Most species are known only from isolated teeth. All fossils range from the Carboniferous to the Permian, where they are presumed to have died out during the Permian/Triassic extinction event.

The two best known species are Belantsea montana, from the Carboniferous Bear Gulch, Montana, and Janassa bituminosa, from the upper Permian of Europe, as whole fossil specimens have been found of these two.
