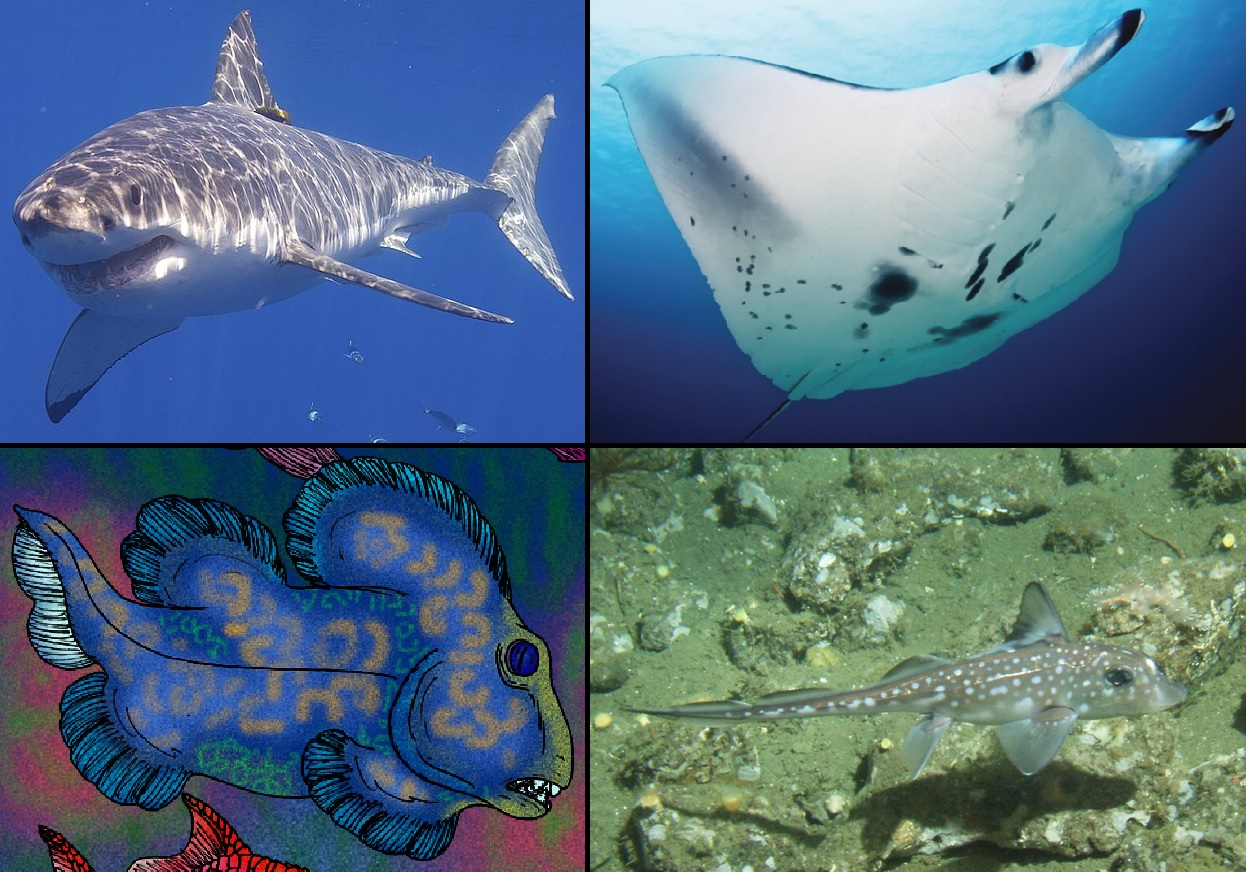
- Example of cartilaginous fishes: Elasmobranchii above, Holocephali below

Scientific classification
- Kingdom: Animalia
- Phylum: Chordata
- Subphylum: Vertebrata
- Infraphylum: Gnathostomata
- Clade: Eugnathostomata
- Class: Chondrichthyes; Huxley, 1880

Living subgroups and incertae sedis
- Subclass Elasmobranchii; Division Selachii; Order Carcharhiniformes; Order Lamniformes; Order Orectolobiformes; Order Heterodontiformes; Order Squaliformes; Order Echinorhiniformes; Order Squatiniformes; Order Pristiophoriformes; Order Hexanchiformes; Division Batomorphi; Order Myliobatiformes; Order Rajiformes; Order Rhinopristiformes; Order Torpediniformes; Subclass Holocephali; Superorder Holocephalimorpha; Order Chimaeriformes; Incertae sedis; †Bandringa; †Delphyodontos; †Listracanthidae; †Mcmurdodontidae; †Nanocetorhinus; †Plesioselachus; †Psammodontiformes; †Omalodontiformes

= Chondrichthyes =

Cartilaginous fishes Temporal range: 439–0 Ma Early Silurian (Aeronian) – Present

Class of jawed cartilaginous fish

Chondrichthyes (/kɒnˈdrɪkθiiːz/; from Ancient Greek χόνδρος (khóndros) 'cartilage' and ἰχθύς (ikhthús) 'fish') is a class of jawed fish that contains the cartilaginous fish or chondrichthyans, which all have skeletons primarily composed of cartilage. They can be contrasted with the Osteichthyes or bony fish, which have skeletons primarily composed of bone tissue. Chondrichthyes are aquatic vertebrates with paired fins, paired nares, placoid scales, and a conus arteriosus in the heart. Within the infraphylum Gnathostomata, cartilaginous fishes are distinct from all other jawed vertebrates.

The class is divided into two subclasses: Elasmobranchii (sharks, rays, skates and sawfish) which lack opercula, and Holocephali (chimaeras, sometimes called ghost sharks, which are sometimes separated into their own class). Extant chondrichthyans range in size from the 10 cm (3.9 in) finless sleeper ray to the over 10 m (33 ft) whale shark.

== Anatomy ==
=== Skeleton ===
The skeleton is cartilaginous. The notochord is gradually replaced by a vertebral column during development, except in Holocephali, where the notochord stays intact. In some deepwater sharks, the column is reduced.

As they do not have bone marrow, red blood cells are produced in the spleen and the epigonal organ (special tissue around the gonads, which is also thought to play a role in the immune system). They are also produced in the Leydig's organ, which is only found in certain cartilaginous fishes. The subclass Holocephali, which is a very specialized group, lacks both the Leydig's and epigonal organs.

=== Appendages ===
Apart from electric rays, which have a thick and flabby body, with soft, loose skin, chondrichthyans have tough skin covered with dermal teeth (again, Holocephali is an exception, as the teeth are lost in adults, only kept on the clasping organ seen on the caudal ventral surface of the male), also called placoid scales (or dermal denticles), making it feel like sandpaper. In most species, all dermal denticles are oriented in one direction, making the skin feel very smooth if rubbed in one direction and very rough if rubbed in the other.

Originally, the pectoral and pelvic girdles, which do not contain any dermal elements, did not connect. In later forms, each pair of fins became ventrally connected in the middle when scapulocoracoid and puboischiadic bars evolved. In rays, the pectoral fins are connected to the head and are very flexible.

One of the primary characteristics present in most sharks is the heterocercal tail, which aids in locomotion.

=== Body covering ===
Chondrichthyans have tooth-like scales called dermal denticles or placoid scales. Denticles usually provide protection, and in most cases, streamlining. Mucous glands exist in some species, as well.

It is assumed that their oral teeth evolved from dermal denticles that migrated into the mouth, but it could be the other way around, as the teleost bony fish Denticeps clupeoides has most of its head covered by dermal teeth (as does, probably, Atherion elymus, another bony fish). This is most likely a secondary evolved characteristic, which means there is not necessarily a connection between the teeth and the original dermal scales.

The old placoderms did not have teeth at all, but had sharp bony plates in their mouth. Thus, it is unknown whether the dermal or oral teeth evolved first. It has even been suggested that the original bony plates of all vertebrates are now gone and that the present scales are just modified teeth, even if both the teeth and body armor had a common origin a long time ago. However, there is currently no evidence of this.

=== Respiratory system ===
All chondrichthyans breathe through five to seven pairs of gills, depending on the species. In general, pelagic species must keep swimming to keep oxygenated water moving through their gills, whilst demersal species can actively pump water in through their spiracles and out through their gills. However, this is only a general rule and many species differ.

A spiracle is a small hole behind each eye. These can be tiny and circular, such as found on the nurse shark (Ginglymostoma cirratum), to extended and slit-like, such as found on the wobbegongs (Orectolobidae). Many larger, pelagic species, such as the mackerel sharks (Lamnidae) and the thresher sharks (Alopiidae), no longer possess them.

=== Nervous system ===
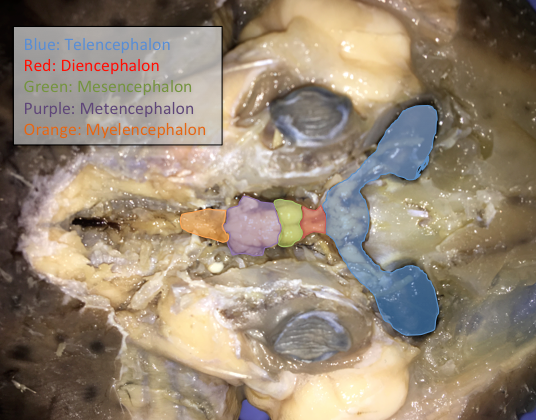
Regions of a Chondrichthyes brain colored and labeled on dissected skate. The rostral end of the skate is to the right.

In chondrichthyans, the nervous system is composed of a small brain, 8–10 pairs of cranial nerves, and a spinal cord with spinal nerves. They have several sensory organs that provide information to be processed. Ampullae of Lorenzini are a network of small jelly-filled pores called electroreceptors which help the fish sense electric fields in water. This aids in finding prey, navigation, and sensing temperature. The lateral line system has modified epithelial cells located externally that sense motion, vibration, and pressure in the water around them. Most species have large, well-developed eyes. Also, they have very powerful nostrils and olfactory organs. Their inner ears consist of 3 large semicircular canals which aid in balance and orientation. Their sound-detecting apparatus has a limited range and is typically more powerful at lower frequencies. Some species have electric organs which can be used for defense and predation. They have relatively simple brains with the forebrain not greatly enlarged. The structure and formation of myelin in their nervous systems are nearly identical to that of tetrapods, which has led evolutionary biologists to believe that Chondrichthyes were a cornerstone group in the evolutionary timeline of myelin development.

=== Immune system ===
Like all other jawed vertebrates, members of Chondrichthyes have an adaptive immune system.

== Reproduction ==
Fertilization is internal. Development is usually live birth (ovoviviparous species) but can be through eggs (oviparous). Some rare species are viviparous. There is no parental care after birth; however, some chondrichthyans do guard their eggs.

Capture-induced premature birth and abortion (collectively called capture-induced parturition) occurs frequently in sharks and rays when fished. Capture-induced parturition is often mistaken for natural birth by recreational fishers and is rarely considered in commercial fisheries management despite being shown to occur in at least 12% of live bearing sharks and rays (88 species to date).

== Classification ==
The class Chondrichthyes has two subclasses: the subclass Elasmobranchii (sharks, rays, skates, and sawfish) and the subclass Holocephali (chimaeras). To see the full list of the species, click here.

Subclasses of cartilaginous fishes
Elasmobranchii	Sharks and rays, skates, and sawfish	Elasmobranchii is a subclass that includes the sharks and the rays and skates. Members of the elasmobranchii have no swim bladders, five to seven pairs of gill clefts opening individually to the exterior, rigid dorsal fins, and small placoid scales. The teeth are in several series; the upper jaw is not fused to the cranium, and the lower jaw is articulated with the upper. The eyes have a tapetum lucidum. The inner margin of each pelvic fin in the male fish is grooved to constitute a clasper for the transmission of sperm. These fish are widely distributed in tropical and temperate waters.
Holocephali	Chimaeras	Holocephali (complete-heads) is a subclass of which the order Chimaeriformes is the only surviving group. This group includes the rat fishes (e.g., Chimaera), rabbit-fishes (e.g., Hydrolagus) and elephant-fishes (Callorhynchus). Today, they preserve some features of elasmobranch life in Paleaozoic times, though in other respects they are aberrant. They live close to the bottom and feed on molluscs and other invertebrates. The tail is long and thin and they move by sweeping movements of the large pectoral fins. There is an erectile spine in front of the dorsal fin, sometimes poisonous. There is no stomach (that is, the gut is simplified and the 'stomach' is merged with the intestine), and the mouth is a small aperture surrounded by lips, giving the head a parrot-like appearance. The fossil record of the Holocephali starts in the Devonian period. The record is extensive, but most fossils are teeth, and the body forms of numerous species are not known, or at best poorly understood.

Extant orders of cartilaginous fishes
Group	Order	Image	Common name	Authority	Families	Genera	Species				Note
Group	Order	Image	Common name	Authority	Families	Genera	Total				Note
Galean sharks	Carcharhiniformes		ground sharks	Compagno, 1977	8	51	>270	7	10	21	
Galean sharks	Heterodontiformes		bullhead sharks	L. S. Berg, 1940	1	1	9				
Galean sharks	Lamniformes		mackerel sharks	L. S. Berg, 1958	7 +2 extinct	10	16			10	
Galean sharks	Orectolobiformes		carpet sharks	Applegate, 1972	7	13	43			7	
Squalomorph sharks	Hexanchiformes		frilled and cow sharks	de Buen, 1926	2 +3 extinct	4 +11 extinct	7 +33 extinct				
Squalomorph sharks	Pristiophoriformes		sawsharks	L. S. Berg, 1958	1	2	6				
Squalomorph sharks	Squaliformes		dogfish sharks	Goodrich, 1909	7	23	126	1		6	
Squalomorph sharks	Squatiniformes		angel sharks	Buen, 1926	1	1	24	3	4	5	
Rays	Myliobatiformes		stingrays and relatives	Compagno, 1973	10	29	223	1	16	33	
Rays	Rhinopristiformes		sawfishes		1	2	5–7	5–7			
Rays	Rajiformes		skates and guitarfishes	L. S. Berg, 1940	5	36	>270	4	12	26	
Rays	Torpediniformes		electric rays	de Buen, 1926	2	12	69	2		9	
Holocephali	Chimaeriformes		chimaera	Obruchev, 1953	3 +2 extinct	6 +3 extinct	39 +17 extinct				

Taxonomy according to Leonard Compagno, 2005 with additions from
- †Order Mongolepidiformes Karatajüte-Talimaa & Novitskaya, 1990
- †Order Omalodontiformes* Turner, 1997
- †Order Coronodontiformes Zangerl, 1981
- †Order Symmoriiformes Zangerl, 1981
- Subclass Holocephali
  - †Superorder Paraselachimorpha
    - †Order Desmiodontiformes Zangerl, 1981
    - †Order Polysentoriformes Cappetta, 1993
    - †Order Orodontiformes Zangerl, 1981
    - †Order Petalodontiformes Zangerl, 1981
    - †Order Helodontiformes Patterson, 1965
    - †Order Iniopterygiformes Zanger, 1973
    - †Order Debeeriiformes Grogan & Lund, 2000
    - †Order Eugeneodontiformes Zangerl, 1981
  - Superorder Holocephalimorpha
    - †Order Psammodontiformes* Obruchev, 1953
    - †Order Copodontiformes Obručhev, 1953
    - †Order Squalorajiformes
    - †Order Chondrenchelyiformes Moy-Thomas, 1939
    - †Order Menaspiformes
    - †Order Cochliodontiformes Obručhev, 1953
    - Order Chimaeriformes Berg, 1940 sensu Obručhev, 1953 (chimaeras)
- Subclass Elasmobranchii
  - †Plesioselachus
  - †Order Antarctilamniformes Ginter, Liao & Valenzuela-Rios, 2008
  - †Order Elegestolepidiformes Andreev et al., 2016
  - †Order Lugalepidida Karatajute-Talimaa, 1997
  - †Order Squatinactiformes Zangerl, 1981
  - †Order Protacrodontiformes Zangerl, 1981
  - †Infraclass Cladoselachimorpha
    - †Order Cladoselachiformes Dean, 1909
  - †Infraclass Xenacanthimorpha Berg, 1940
    - †Order Bransonelliformes Hampe & Ivanov, 2007
    - †Order Xenacanthiformes Berg, 1940
  - Infraclass Euselachii (sharks and rays)
    - †Order Altholepidiformes Andreev et al., 2015
    - †Order Polymerolepidiformes
    - †Order Ptychodontiformes
    - †Order Ctenacanthiformes Zangerl, 1981
    - †Division Hybodonta
      - †Order Hybodontiformes Owen, 1846
    - Division Neoselachii Compagno, 1977
      - Subdivision Selachii (modern sharks)
        - Superorder Galeomorphi Compagno, 1977
          - Order Heterodontiformes (bullhead sharks)
          - Order Orectolobiformes (carpet sharks)
          - Order Lamniformes (mackerel sharks)
          - Order Carcharhiniformes (ground sharks)
        - Superorder Squalomorphi
          - Order Chlamydoselachiformes
          - Order Hexanchiformes (frilled and cow sharks)
          - Order Squaliformes (dogfish sharks)
          - †Order Protospinaciformes
          - †Order Synechodontiformes
          - Order Squatiniformes (angel sharks)
          - Order Pristiophoriformes (sawsharks)
      - Subdivision Batoidea
        - Order Torpediniformes (electric rays)
        - Order Pristiformes (sawfishes)
        - Order Rajiformes (skates and guitarfishes)
        - Order Myliobatiformes (stingrays and relatives)

* position uncertain

== Evolution ==
Cartilaginous fish are considered to have evolved from acanthodians. The discovery of Entelognathus and several examinations of acanthodian characteristics indicate that bony fish evolved directly from placoderm like ancestors, while acanthodians represent a paraphyletic assemblage leading to Chondrichthyes. Some characteristics previously thought to be exclusive to acanthodians are also present in basal cartilaginous fish. In particular, new phylogenetic studies find cartilaginous fish to be well nested among acanthodians, with Doliodus and Tamiobatis being the closest relatives to Chondrichthyes. Recent studies vindicate this, as Doliodus had a mosaic of chondrichthyan and acanthodian traits. Dating back to the Middle and Late Ordovician Period, many isolated scales, made of dentine and bone, have a structure and growth form that is chondrichthyan-like. They may be the remains of stem-chondrichthyans, but their classification remains uncertain.

The earliest unequivocal fossils of acanthodian-grade cartilaginous fishes are Qianodus and Fanjingshania from the early Silurian (Aeronian) of Guizhou, China around 439 million years ago, which are also the oldest unambiguous remains of any jawed vertebrates. Shenacanthus vermiformis, which lived 436 million years ago, had thoracic armour plates resembling those of placoderms.

By the start of the Early Devonian, 419 million years ago, jawed fishes had divided into three distinct groups: the now extinct placoderms (a paraphyletic assemblage of ancient armoured fishes), the bony fishes, and the clade that includes spiny sharks and early cartilaginous fish. The modern bony fishes, class Osteichthyes, appeared in the late Silurian or early Devonian, about 416 million years ago. The first abundant genus of shark, Cladoselache, appeared in the oceans during the Devonian Period. The first cartilaginous fishes evolved from Doliodus-like spiny shark ancestors.

Palaeozoic chondrichthyans were substantially more diverse taxonomically than chondrichthyans in the present day, with six different superorders representing the Palaeozoic chondrichthyan fauna. This high taxonomic diversity translated into greater morphological and ecological diversity compared to the present.

Over the course of their evolutionary history, chondrichthyan jaw morphology has become more diverse, particularly in lineages evolving more specialised life modes such as pursuit predation and durophagy.

Extinct orders of cartilaginous fishes
Group	Order	Image	Common name	Authority	Families	Genera	Species	Note
Holocephali	†Orodontiformes		Orodonts	Zangerl, 1981	2			Early members of Chondrichthyes based mostly on teeth. Includes many species that are unrelated to one another.
Holocephali	†Petalodontiformes		Petalodonts	Patterson, 1965 (equiv. to Petalodontida Zangerl, 1981)	5 or 6			Members of holocephali. Some resembled skates or rays, while others were compressed and had beak-like jaws.
Holocephali	†Helodontiformes		Helodonts	Patterson, 1965	1	1	1?	Members of Holocephali based mostly on teeth. A single species is known from skeletal fossils.
Holocephali	†Iniopterygiformes		Iniopterygians	Zangerl & Case, 1973 (as Iniopterygia)	2			Early chondrichthyans that resembled flying fish. May be members of Holocephali.
Holocephali	†Debeeriiformes			Grogan & Lund, 2000	1	2	2	Members of Holocephali with a primitive form of jaw suspension called autodiastyly.
Holocephali	†Symmoriiformes		Symmoriids	Zangerl, 1981 (sensu Maisey, 2007)	2 or 3			Potential members of Holocephali that were heavily sexually dimorphic. Males had an organ called a "spine-brush complex" instead of a first dorsal fin.
Holocephali	†Eugeneodontiformes		Eugeneodonts	Zangerl, 1981 (as Eugeneodontida)	4 or 5			Members of holocephali, they are characterized by large tooth whorls in their jaws.
Holocephali	†Psammodonti- formes			Obruchev, 1953	1			Members of Holocephali, almost exclusively known from teeth. A single skull is known, which had armor plates.
Holocephali	†Copodontiformes			Obruchev, 1953	1			Members of Holocephali. Relationships and appearance are uncertain as this order is only known from teeth.
Holocephali	†Squalorajiformes				1	2?	2?	Members of Holocephali, sometimes included in Chimaeriformes.
Holocephali	†Chondrenchelyi- formes			Patterson, 1965	2			Members of Holocephali with eel-like bodies and teeth similar to modern chimaeras. Members are sexually dimorphic.
Holocephali	†Menaspiformes			Obruchev, 1953 (equiv. to Menaspoidei Patterson, 1965)	3			Members of Holocephali with heavy armor plating. Historically misinterpreted as placoderms or ostracoderms.
Holocephali	†Cochliodontiformes		Cochliodonts	Obruchev, 1953	2			Members of Holocephali known almost exclusively from teeth; some body fossils are known but have not been described.
Squalomorph sharks	†Protospinaci- formes				1			
Other	†Squatinactiformes			Cappetta et al., 1993	1	1	1	Early chondrichthyans with ray-like bodies.
Other	†Protacrodonti- formes			Zangerl, 1981	1			Early members of Elasmobranchii.
Other	†Cladoselachi- formes			Dean, 1894	1	2		Potentially members of Holocephali and of the Symmoriiformes.
Other	†Xenacanthiformes		Xenacanths	Glikman, 1964	2 or 3			Eel-like chondrichthyans that typically lived in freshwater. May be members of Elasmobranchii.
Other	†Ctenacanthi- formes		Ctenacanths	Glikman, 1964	1 or 2			Shark-like chondrichthyans characterized by their robust heads and large dorsal fin spines. May be members of Elasmobranchii
Other	†Hybodontiformes		Hybodonts	Patterson, 1966	10 or 11			Shark-like elasmobranchs distinguished by their conical tooth shape, and the presence of a spine on each of their two dorsal fins.

== Taxonomy ==
- Vertebrata
  - Gnathostomata
    - Placodermi † (armored gnathostomes)
    - - Eugnathostomata (true jawed vertebrates)
        - Acanthodii † (stem cartilaginous fish)
        - Chondrichthyes (true cartilaginous fish)
          - Holocephali (chimaeras)
          - Elasmobranchii
            - Selachii (true sharks)
            - Batoidea (rays and relatives)

== See also ==
- List of cartilaginous fish
- Cartilaginous versus bony fishes
- Largest cartilaginous fishes
- Important Shark and Ray Areas (ISRA)
- Threatened rays
- Threatened sharks
- Placodermi
- Acanthodii
