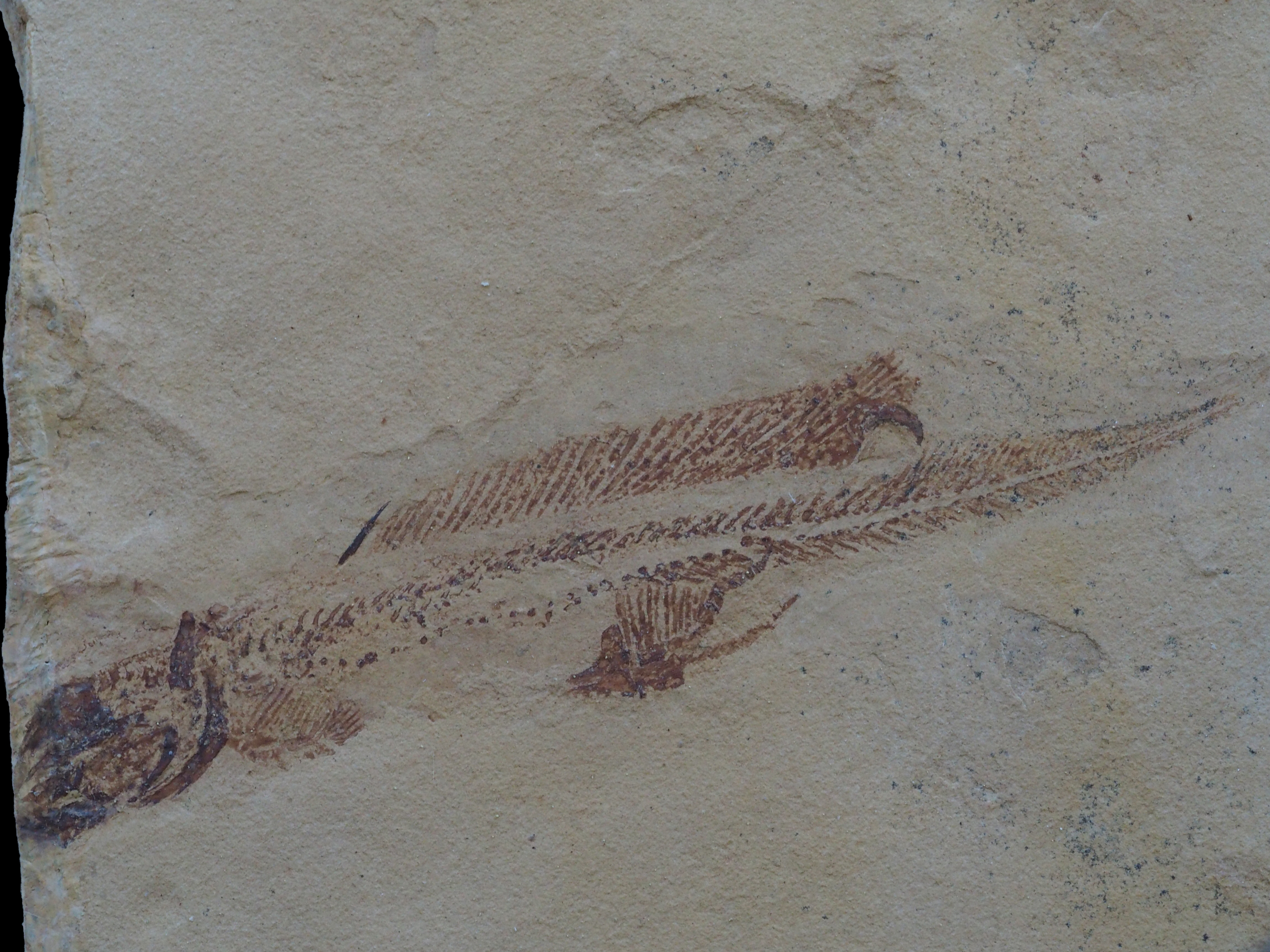
- Well-preserved specimen of H. elegantulus

Scientific classification
- Kingdom: Animalia
- Phylum: Chordata
- Class: Chondrichthyes
- Subclass: Holocephali
- Order: †Debeeriiformes
- Family: †Debeeriidae
- Genus: †Heteropetalus; Lund, 1977
- Species: †H. elegantulus

Binomial name
- †Heteropetalus elegantulus Lund, 1977

= Heteropetalus =

Heteropetalus Temporal range: Serpukhovian

Extinct genus of cartilaginous fish

Heteropetalus is a genus of chondrichthyan from the Mississippian age Bear Gulch Limestone of Montana. One species, H. elegantulus, is known. Known fossils of Heteropetalus are exceptionally well preserved, displaying details of the soft tissue anatomy such as the eyes and an opercular cover over the gills. Heteropetalus is a member of the family Debeeriidae and the order Debeeriiformes.

== Discovery and naming ==
Heteropetalus elegantulus was named in 1977 by paleontologist Richard Lund, based on several fossil specimens collected from the Serpukhovian-stage Bear Gulch Limestone of Fergus County, Montana. The holotype (specimen based on which the species is named) is housed at the University of Montana Museum of Paleontology, and is designated MV 2778.

== Description ==
The mouth was positioned subterminally (opened at the front of the snout) and may have had a form of lips, although these were not supported by labial cartilages (skeletal elements in the lips of sharks). While the palatoquadrates (upper jaws) were initially interpreted as hyostylic and mobile in the genus' description, further research has shown them to have instead been autodiastylic, meaning they were attached tightly to the skull and were immobile. Behind the skull were four gill arches, which were covered by a soft operculum. The animal had a scaleless, fusiform body and a diphycercal tail fin. A fin spine protruded from the front of the single long dorsal fin that ran down the length of the body. Heteropetalus grew to 12 centimeters (4.7 in) in length.

Heteropetalus was sexually dimorphic, and the males had larger, modified dorsal fins which supported hook-like organs.

== Classification ==
When first described, the genus was identified as a member of the order Petalodontiformes. Later research by the paleontologist Rainer Zangerl instead found a tentative relation between Heteropetalus and Desmiodus, and the two were classified together in the order Desmiodontiformes. The genus Desmiodus and the order Desmiodontiformes have subsequently fallen out of use, however. The most recent research by Richard Lund and Eileen Grogan has placed Heteropetalus in the order Debeeriiformes and the family Debeeriidae, due to similarities with the genus Debeerius.

== Paleobiology and paleoecology ==
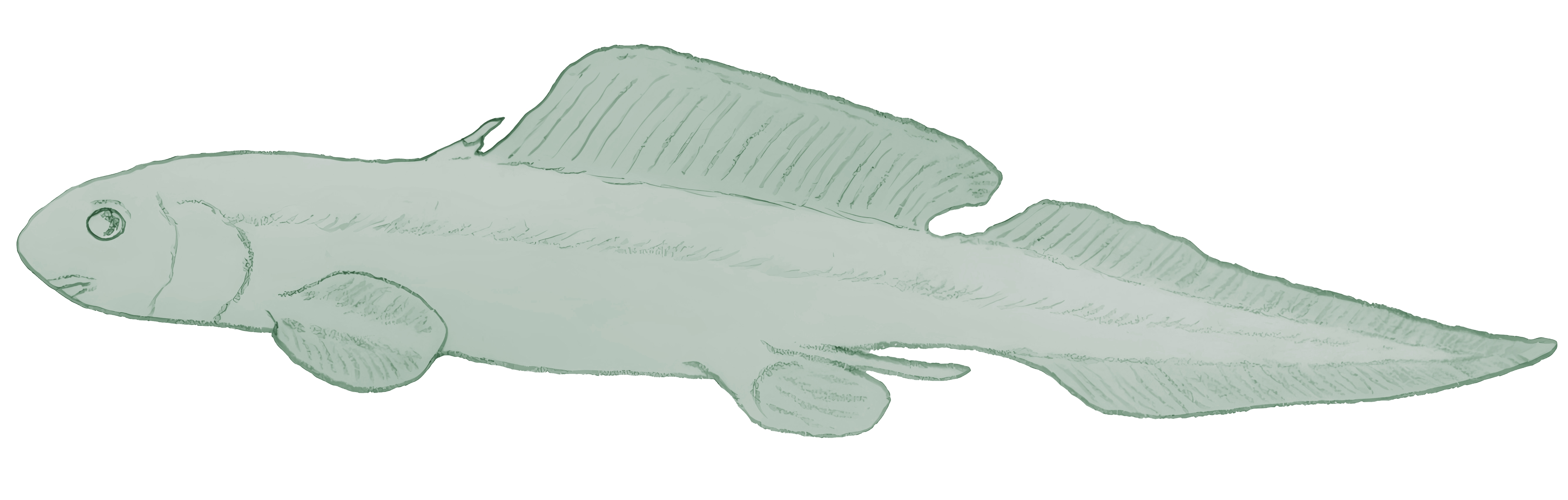
Life reconstruction of Heteropetalus elegantulus

The hook-like structure on the dorsal fin of male Heteropetalus likely functioned as a clasper, and was used to grab females during mating.

Like many other benthic fish known from the Bear Gulch Limestone, specimens of Heteropetalus were preserved by loose, fine sediments rapidly burying them during mudslides. The H. elegantulus buried by the mud then died by asphyxiation, as indicated by the blood vessels in their fossilized gills, and were preserved in exceptional detail.
