= Metapterygoid =

Paired bone of the skull in some fishes

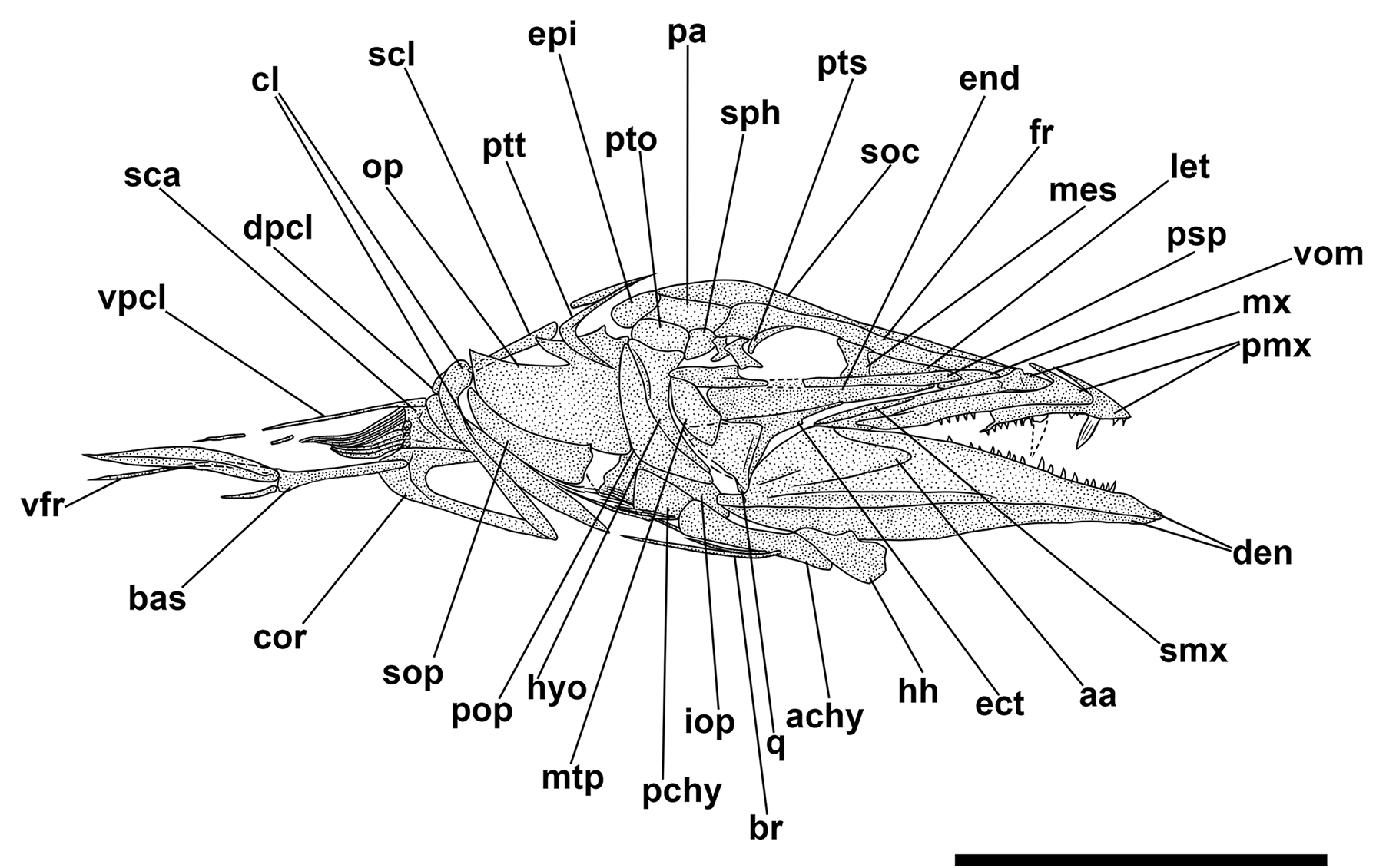
Skull of Exeomastix. Metapterygoid is labeled mtp.

The metapterygoid is a paired bone present in the skull of many fishes. It is homologous to a part of the palatoquadrate, of which it is the pars metapterygoidea; ancestrally, it forms a connection point between the palate and the braincase. In most tetrapods, a small part of it ossifies as the epipterygoid (known in mammals as the alisphenoid).

== Anatomy ==
The metapterygoid ossifies endochondrally, and is a part of the splanchnocranium; more specifically, it develops as the posterior dorsal part of the palatoquadrate. This region is known as the pars metapterygoidea when the entire palatoquadrate is ossified as one bone or, alternatively, when the palatoquadrate is entirely cartilaginous. The term "metapterygoid" is sometimes used to refer to a portion of the palatoquadrate, a practice which has led to confusion.

The metapterygoid ancestrally articulates anteroventrally with the autopalatine and posteroventrally with the quadrate. Dorsally, it may articulate with the chondrocranium, specifically the temporal and otic region; this articulation is generally accomplished by dorsal processes. In teleosts, it articulates with the hyomandibula. It may also articulate with dermal bones of the palate, especially the entopterygoid.

Among some teleosts, dermal tooth plates may fuse to the metapterygoid. Confusion about this process led to the proposal of a bony element called the dermometapterygoid; this element is not believed to exist.

== Evolution ==
As a part of the splanchnocranium, the metapterygoid originally evolved from the branchial arches - specifically, the dorsal element of the first (mandibular) arch. This element, known as the palatoquadrate, is ancestrally cartilaginous; hence, among cartilaginous fishes, a metapterygoid proper is absent (though a pars metapterygoidea may be present as a portion of the palatoquadrate).

The metapterygoid first appears as a unique bone among some of the so-called acanthodians, a paraphyletic group of early gnathostomes.

The earliest members of Actinopterygii had a fully ossified palatoquadrate; a distinct metapterygoid is present among extant basal members of the clade, such as bowfins, gars, and bichirs, as well as among teleosts; among most actinopterygians, the element does not articulate with the braincase.

Ancestral sarcopterygians also have a fully ossified palatoquadrate and thus lack the metapterygoid. An distinct metapterygoid is present among coelacanths, and is thought to have evolved convergently with the element of actinopterygians and acanthodians. A distinct metapterygoid is present among many stem-tetrapods, including Tiktaalik and other elpistostegalians.

Among tetrapods, the epipterygoid (alisphenoid) is homologous to the basal process of the element. Among lissamphibians, the so-called pterygoid process of the palatoquadrate is equivalent to the pars metapterygoidea; it ossifies in some caecilians, where it has been confused with the pterygoid. In some temnospondyls such as Capitosaurus, the expanded epipterygoid is sometimes referred to as the metapterygoid. A bone sometimes referred to as the metapterygoid is present among some hynobiid salamanders; this element has also been referred to as the epipterygoid, and represents perichondral ossification of the ascending process of the palatoquadrate.
