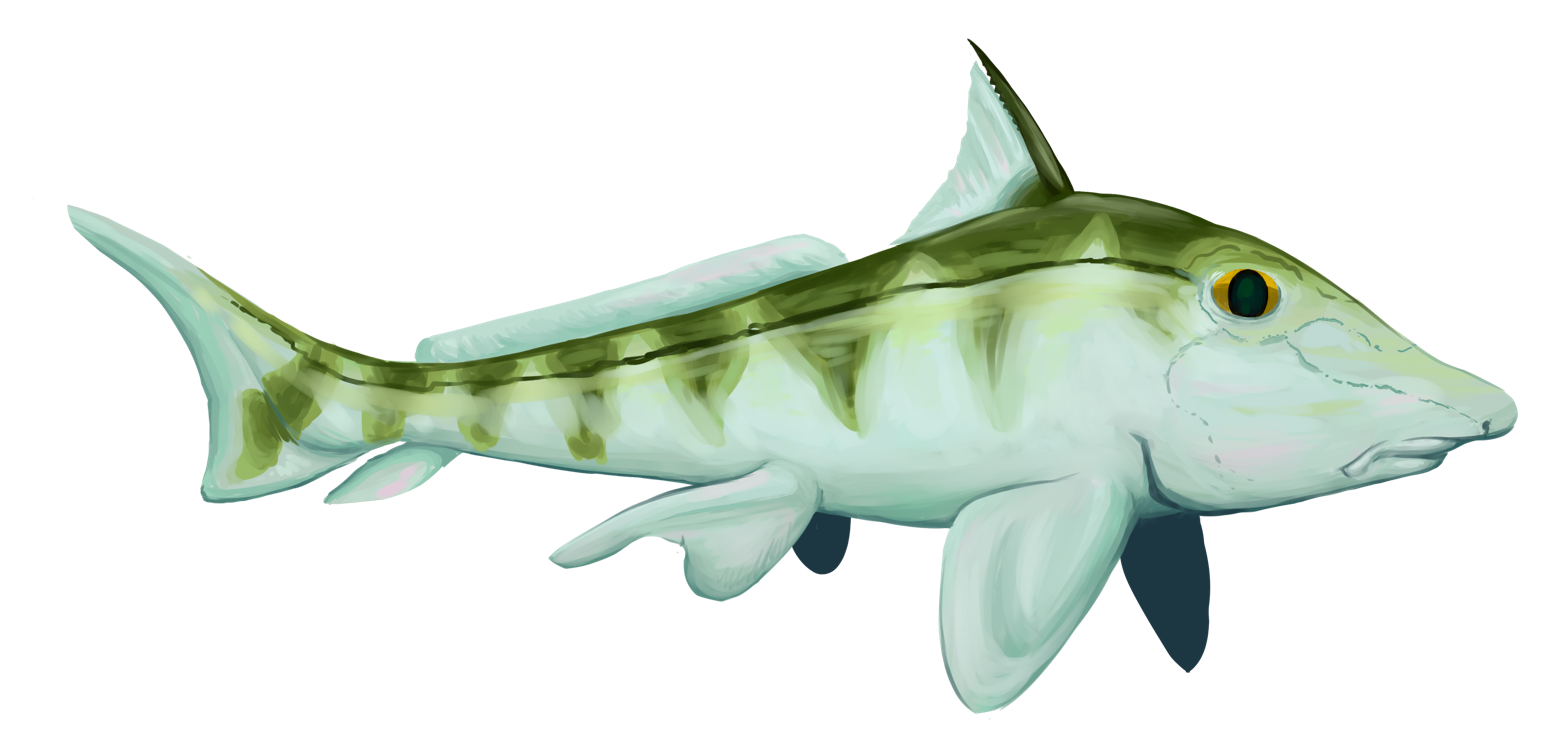
- Life reconstruction of Debeerius, the type genus
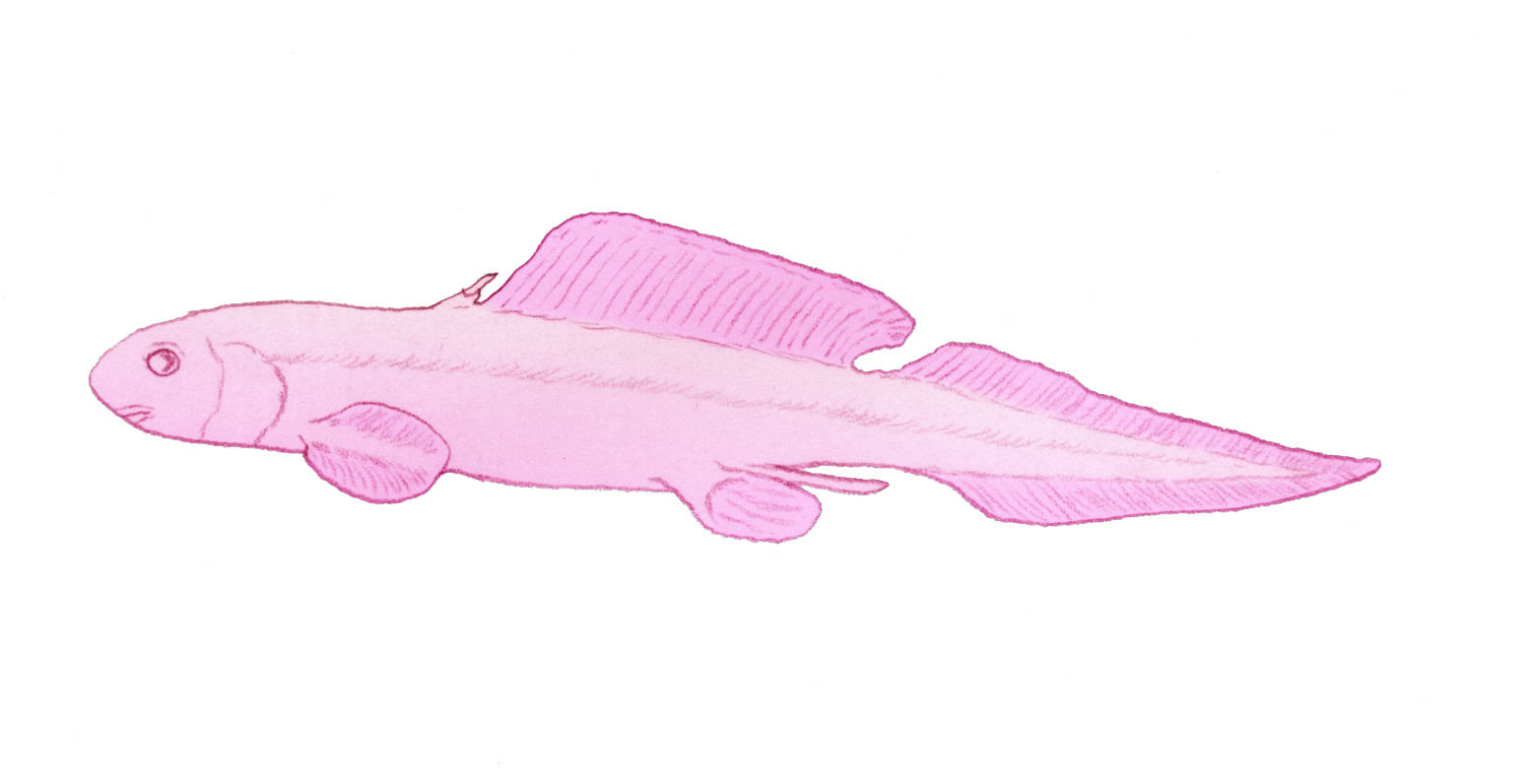
- Life reconstruction of Heteropetalus

Scientific classification
- Kingdom: Animalia
- Phylum: Chordata
- Class: Chondrichthyes
- Subclass: Holocephali
- Order: †Debeeriiformes
- Family: †Debeeriidae; Grogan & Lund, 2000

Type genus
- Debeerius Grogan & Lund, 2000

Genera
- Debeerius; Heteropetalus

Synonyms
- Debeeridae Nelson (2006)

= Debeeriidae =

Debeeriidae Temporal range: Mississippian

Extinct family of cartilaginous fishes

Debeeriidae is an extinct family of cartilaginous fish from the Mississippian subperiod of the Carboniferous period. It is the only family of the order Debeeriiformes. It is named after the type genus, Debeerius, which itself is named in honor of biologist Gavin de Beer. Members of this family and order possess a spine on the first dorsal fin, an opercular cover over the gills, and a form of jaw suspension termed autodiastyly. Two genera are placed in the family, Debeerius and Heteropetalus, and both are known from exceptionally well-preserved specimens found in the Bear Gulch Limestone member of the Heath Formation.

== History of research ==
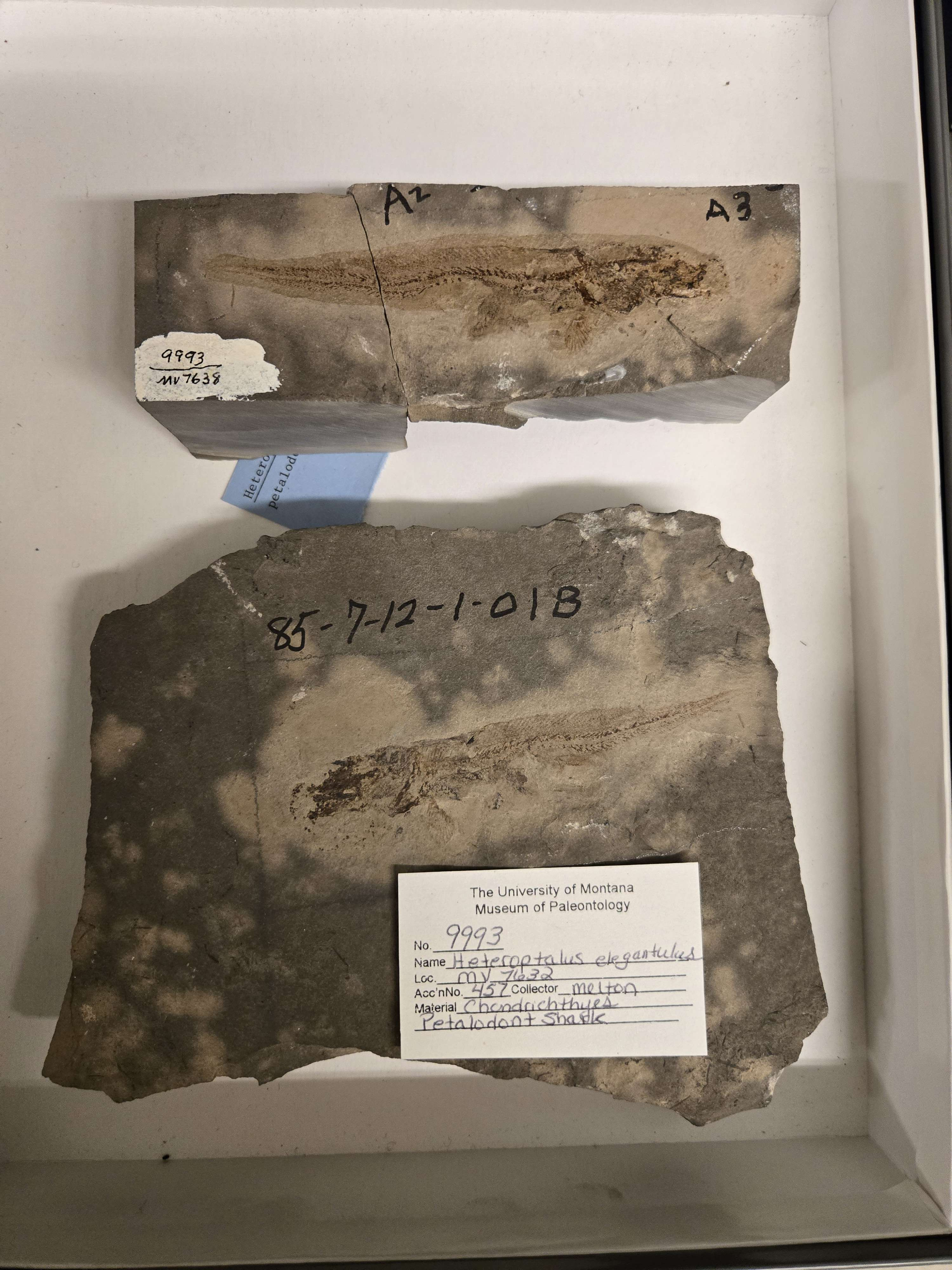
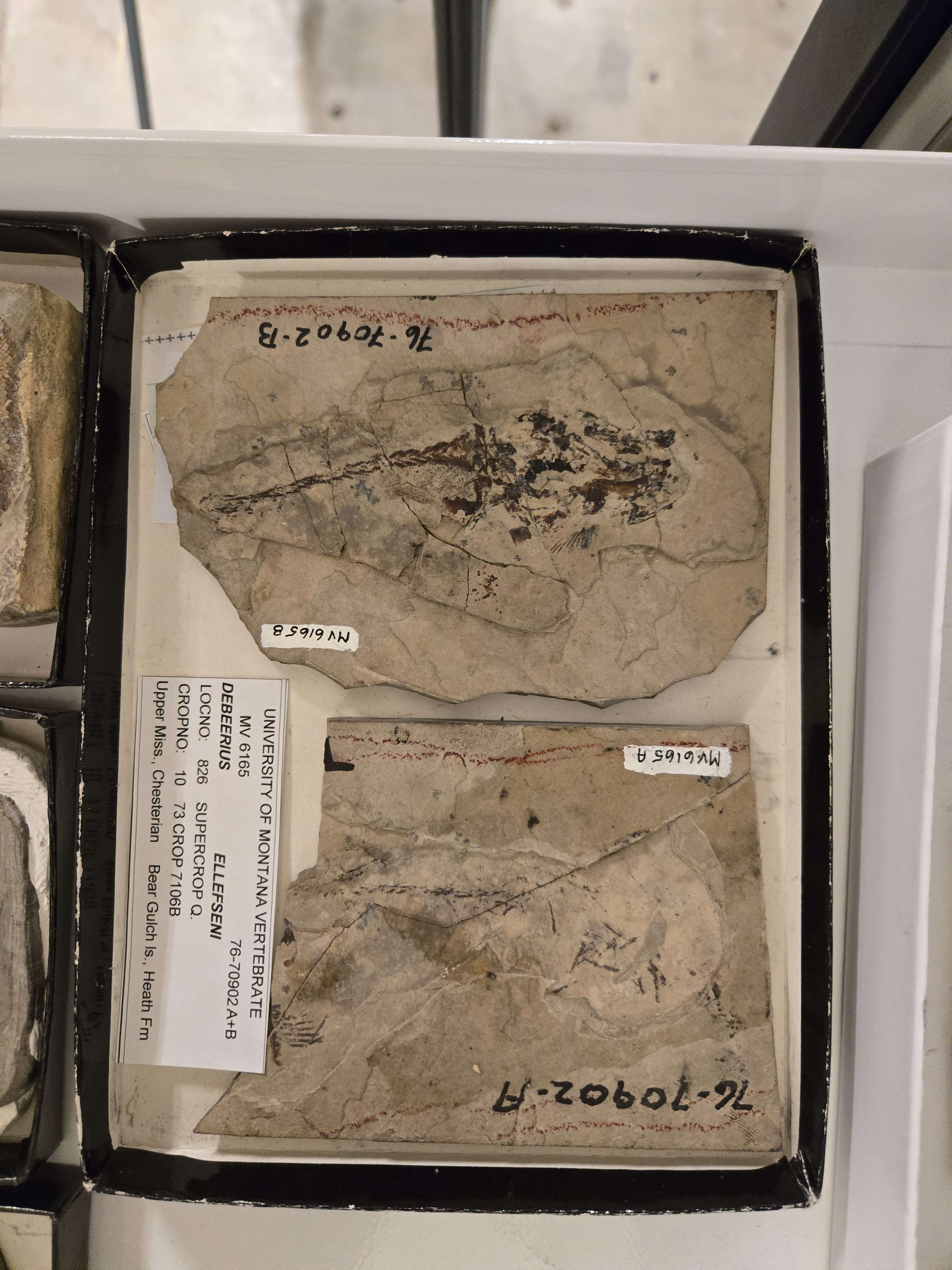
Specimens of Heteropetalus (left) and Debeerius (right) preserved as part and counterpart. Both specimens come from the Bear Gulch Limestone

The first member of the family to be named and described was Heteropetalus from the Bear Gulch Limestone unit of the Heath Formation in Montana, USA, which was named in 1977 by paleontologist Richard Lund. When first described, details of the animal's anatomy such as the structure of the jaws and teeth were misinterpreted, and the genus was variously considered a relative of various different groups of extinct cartilaginous fish. Works by Lund and fellow researcher Eileen Grogan in the 1990s better clarified the anatomy and relations of Heteropetalus.

In 2000 Lund and Grogan described another fish from the Bear Gulch Limestone, which they named Debeerius after embryologist Gavin de Beer. This genus shares key distinguishing features in common with Heteropetalus, and the two were classified together within the newly-coined family Debeeriidae based on cladistic analyses.

Both genera are known from multiple complete skeletons with soft tissues preserved. Skin pigments are known in Debeerius, while blood pigments are known in Heteropetalus.

== Description ==
Members of Debeeriidae had a first dorsal fin with a spine, paired pectoral and pelvic fins, and heterocercal caudal fins. The bodies of debeeriids were completely scaleless, and Debeerius had a striped pattern along the length of its body. The gills of debeeriids were covered by a soft flap termed an operculum, which was supported by the fish's hyomandibular arch. The jaws of debeeriids were supported in a manner termed autodyastyly, where the upper jaw (palatoquadrates) is separated from the skull but is immobile, and the lower jaw (Meckel's cartilages) is not supported by the hyomandibular. The internal skeletons of debeeriids were composed of cartilage.

== Classification ==
The Debeeriidae is a member of the monotypic order Debeeriiformes. They are cartilaginous fish in the Class Chondrichthyes, and the subclass Holocephali.
