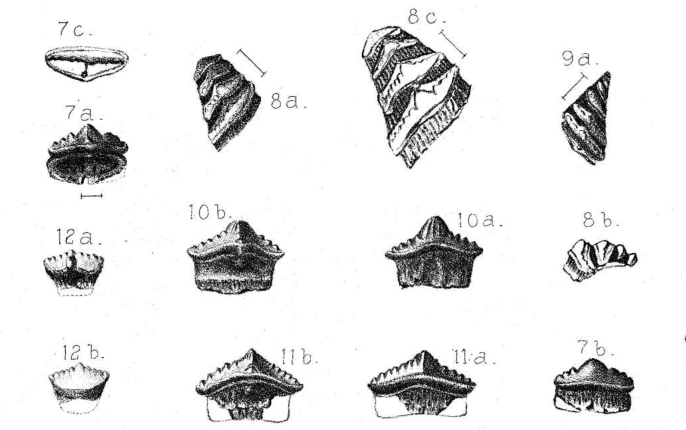
- A collection of teeth from Desmiodus tumidus (7-9), D. costelliferus (10-11), and D.? ligoniformis (12)

Scientific classification
- Kingdom: Animalia
- Phylum: Chordata
- Class: Chondrichthyes
- Subclass: Holocephali
- Order: †Desmiodontiformes
- Genus: †Desmiodus; St. John & Worthen, 1875

Type species
- Desmiodus tumidus St. John & Worthen, 1875

Other species
- D. costelliferus St. John & Worthen, 1875; D.? ligoniformis St. John & Worthen, 1875; D.? flabellum St. John & Worthen, 1875

= Desmiodus =

Extinct genus of cartilaginous fish

Desmiodus is a dubious form genus of extinct cartilaginous fish from the Carboniferous period. It is the type genus of the obsolete order Desmiodontiformes (also spelled Desmiodontida). Desmiodus is known only from isolated teeth, which have been assigned to numerous different species. The teeth of the genus are indistinguishable from those of genera in the family Gregoriidae.

== Discovery and naming ==
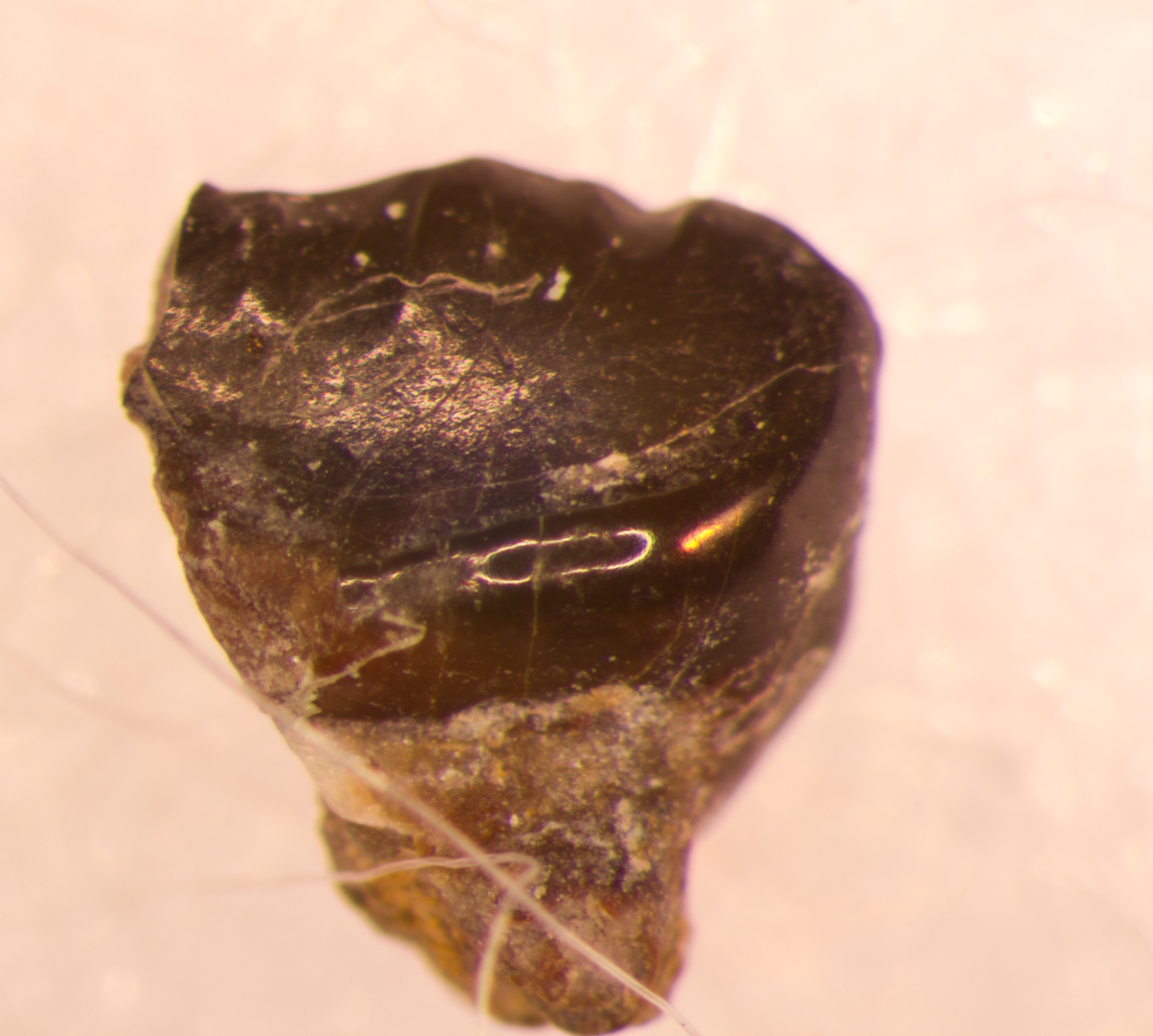
Tooth of Desmiodus? ligoniformis from the Keokuk Limestone

The genus was named and described by researchers Amos Henry Worthen and Orestes St. John in 1875, based on both isolated and articulated tooth fossils discovered by a man identified as Mr. Van Horne. The type species, Desmiodus tumidus, and the assigned species D. costelliferus were described from large numbers of well-preserved teeth from the Early Carboniferous St. Louis Limestone of Illinois and Missouri. St. John and Worthen also considered two additional, more poorly-known species from the Keokuk Limestone of Missouri to be potential members of the genus: Desmiodus? ligoniformis and Desmiodus? flabellum. The placement of these species was questioned by St. John and Worthen themselves at the time of description, and the 2010 edition of the Handbook of Paleoichthyology by Michal Ginter and coauthors includes only D. tumidus and D. costelliferus in the genus. Additional tooth remains assigned to Desmiodus sp. are known from the Salem Formation of Missouri.

== Description ==
The teeth are characterized as small in the genus' description. The taxon's teeth were organized tooth-whorls consisting of up to seven tooth crowns, which were sometimes fused at the tooth bases (equivalent to roots) and sometimes separate from one another. The largest teeth in the whorl were the youngest, while the smaller teeth were older. Each individual tooth crown may possess several short, blunt cusps, although the shape of the tooth crowns varies wildly between specimens. Desmiodus teeth are grouped into "short" and "elongated" varieties and the genus was heterodont, meaning different teeth take on different shapes in different regions of the mouth. The bases of the teeth were thinner and flatter than the crowns, which are broad and triangular in top-down view. The tooth histology of Desmiodus consists of two layers of orthodentin with an outer coating of enameloid. The dentin was arranged into tubules, which formed a complex branching pattern in the outer layer.

== History of classification ==
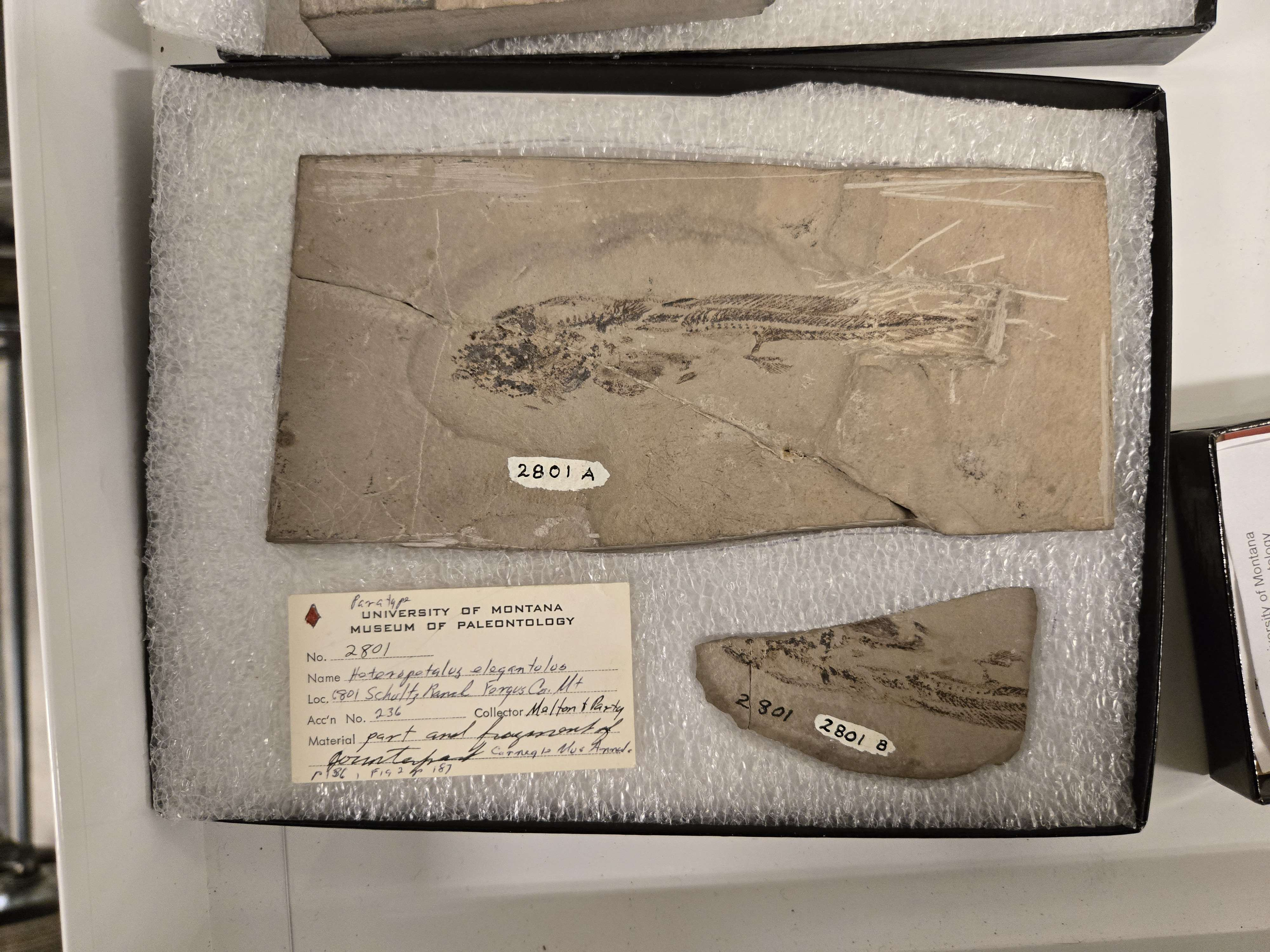
Heteropetalus elegantulus (pictured) was formerly assigned to the now-obsolete order Desmiodontida. This species is known from well-preserved body fossils

When described by St. John and Worthen, Desmiodus was compared to Orodus and Chomatodus, although the arrangement of the teeth was noted to be very similar to cochliodonts as well. Researcher Rainer Zangerl proposed the order Desmiodontida (amended to Desmiodontiformes by later authors) in the 1981 edition of the Handbook of Paleoichthyology, which grouped Desmiodus with Heteropetalus based on apparent similarities between their teeth. Desmiodontida was itself grouped into the subclass Elasmobranchii, which includes modern sharks and rays. Heteropetalus has subsequently been allied with the genus Debeerius in the order Debeeriiformes and subclass Holocephali (or the equivalent Euchondrocephali), and the supposed similarities between the teeth of Desmiodus and Heteropetalus are now thought to have been misinterpreted.

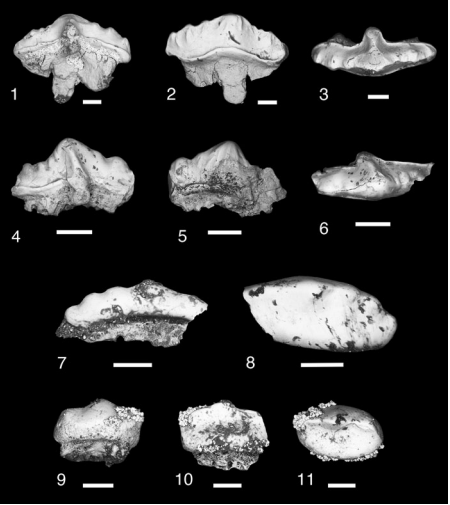
Teeth of the gregoriid Srianta, which are indistinguishable from those of Desmiodus

A 2004 paper by Richard Lund and Eileen Grogan described a new family of cartilaginous fish which they named Gregoriidae, which all had teeth which could not be distinguished from those assigned to Desmiodus. These authors concluded that the genus Desmiodus and its included species is thus undiagnostic and nomen dubia, referred to the genus as an organ taxon or form taxon, and regarded it as equivalent to Gregoriidae. Subsequent authors no longer recognize the order Desmiodontiformes, and place Desmiodus in an incertae sedis position within Holocephali or Euchondrocephali.

== See also ==
- List of prehistoric cartilaginous fish genera
