= Mentomeckelian =

Bone in the lower jaw of some vertebrates

Skull and skeleton of the frog Rhombophryne. Mentomeckelians are present at the front of the lower jaw, labeled mmk.

The mentomeckelian or mentomandibular is a paired bone present in the lower jaw of some vertebrates. It is an endochondral bone that consists of the ossified anterior tip of Meckel's cartilage, the ancestral cartilaginous lower jaw. It joins the dentaries together at the mandibular symphysis.

== Evolution ==
Meckel's cartilage originated as the lower of two cartilages of the mandibular branchial arch of the splanchnocranium. Articulating with the palatoquadrate at its rear, it formed the ancestral lower jaw among ancient gnathostomes, and continues to serve this role in modern chondrichthyans (sharks and rays). Among the earliest placoderms, Meckel's cartilage underwent perichondral ossification and partly turned to bone. Among later placoderms, however, only the posteriormost and anteriormost portions of the cartilage ossified. The posterior element became the articular; the anterior element became the mentomandibular. Among arthrodires, the mentomandibular does not ossify.

The mentomeckelian is present among primitive actinopterygians; in teleosts, the mentomeckelian becomes fused with the anterior third of the dentary. This is often incorrectly assumed to reflect an absence of the mentomeckelian, but developmental evidence shows its presence and subsequent fusion.

It is ancestrally present as a distinct element among sarcopterygians, including coelacanths. Among early tetrapodomorphs, Meckel's cartilage often fully ossifies, but does not generally contribute to the symphysis.

In all lissamphibians save for pipoid frogs, the mentomeckelian is present; in some frogs, it fuses with the dentary; in caecilians, it fuses with the dentary, splenial, coronoid, and surangular to form the pseudodentary.

Rarely, mentomeckelian bones are present among lizards and birds. It has been speculated that the predentary bone of ornithischian dinosaurs is homologous to the mentomeckelian; the predentary bone of some toothed birds, however, is not.

The mentomeckelian is generally considered to be absent in mammals, though in humans, bilateral ossification centers that may correspond to the tip of Meckel's cartilage are incorporated into the dentary.
