= Autopalatine =

Bone of the upper jaw in some fish

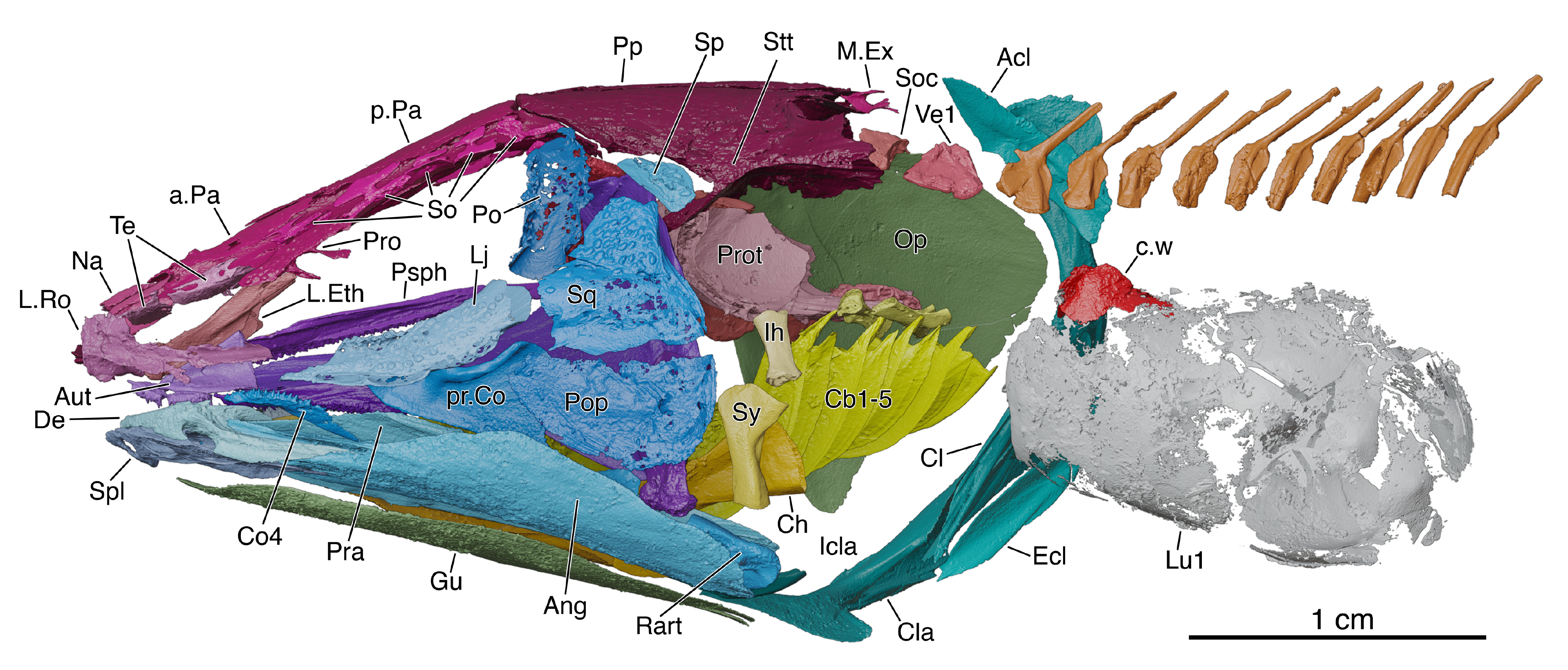
Skull of Graulia. Autopalatine is shown in lavender and labeled aut.

The autopalatine is a paired endochondral bone of the skull in many fish. It develops from the palatoquadrate, of which it is equivalent to the pars autopalatina. When present, it forms an internal portion of the upper jaw, helping to secure the jaw to the ethmoid region.

== Anatomy ==
The autopalatine ossifies endochondrally from the anterior portion of the palatoquadrate (the pars autopalatina), and as such is a part of the splanchnocranium. More rarely, the term is used to refer to the pars autopalatina when the autopalatine does not ossify as a distinct element.

The autopalatine is typically a small element and does not typically articulate with other bones of the palatoquadrate (the metapterygoid and quadrate), being separated from them by unossified cartilage of the palatoquadrate. On its palatal surface it typically contacts the palatine, to which it fuses in teleosts; to avoid confusion, the term dermopalatine is often used for the latter element. Its palatal surface also contacts the predermopalatine and, rarely, the vomer. Posteriorly it typically contacts the entopterygoid; laterally, it contacts the maxilla; dorsally, it may contact the ethmoid region (specifically the mesethmoid and/or preeethmoid).

== Evolution ==
The autopalatine has its evolutionary origins in the gill arches of primitive fishes. Specifically, the dorsal portion of the mandibular arch (the palatoquadrate) became specialised in early jawed fishes, becoming the primary cartilaginous element of the upper jaw. Among ancestral osteichthyans, the palatoquadrate ossifies as a single bony element; however, among some actinopterygians and some coelacanths, the palatoquadrate became divided into three distinct bones. The most anterior of these is the autopalatine.

Among modern actinopterygians, a distinct autopalatine is present in bichirs, bowfins, and teleosts, but is absent among most basal actinopterygian groups (in which the palatoquadrate is typically either completely ossified or completely cartilaginous). In early members of Acipenseriformes, a distinct autopalatine is present, though it has historically been confused with the metapterygoid. The autopalatine of catfishes is enlarged and ossifies early in development, which allows it to play a role in support and movement of the barbels.

A distinct ossified autopalatine is also present in coelacanths. The earliest fossil members of the clade have a fully ossified palatoquadrate, suggesting that the element evolved convergently with that of actinopterygians.

In tetrapods, the pars autopalatina is homologous to the anterior part of the pterygoid process of the cartilaginous palatoquadrate. Early in ontogeny it fuses to the cartilage of the ethmoid region to become the commissura quadratocranialis.
