= Splanchnocranium =

Portion of the cranium that is derived from pharyngeal arches

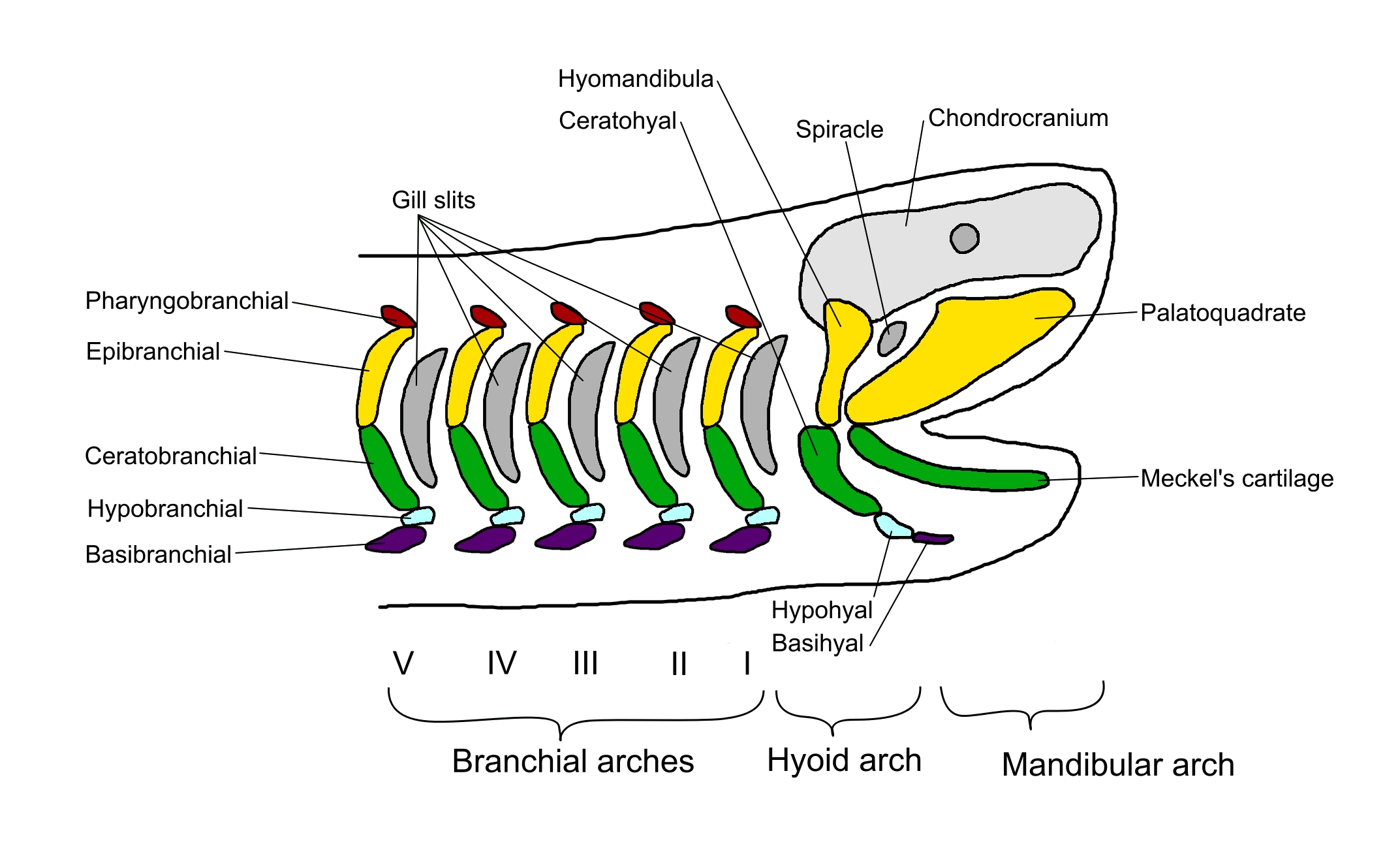
The branchial arches of primitive chordates are believed to have given rise to the jaws and hyoid of jawed vertebrates.

The splanchnocranium (or visceral skeleton) is the portion of the cranium that is derived from pharyngeal arches. Splanchno indicates to the gut because the face forms around the mouth, which is an end of the gut. The splanchnocranium consists of cartilage and endochondral bone. In mammals, the splanchnocranium comprises the three ear ossicles (i.e., incus, malleus, and stapes), as well as the alisphenoid, the styloid process, the hyoid apparatus, and the thyroid cartilage.

In other tetrapods, such as amphibians and reptiles, homologous bones to those of mammals, such as the quadrate, articular, columella, and entoglossus are part of the splanchnocranium.

== Evolution ==
Gill slits are thought to have been present in the most recent common ancestor of living deuterostomes; they are present in modern hemichordates and lancelets. In lancelets, numerous gill slits are present; they are used for filter feeding as well as respiration. Haikouichthys, among the earliest known vertebrates, is thought to have been similar. However, Haikouichthys is believed to have had nine cartilaginous pharyngeal arches. The visceral skeleton evolved from structures like these.

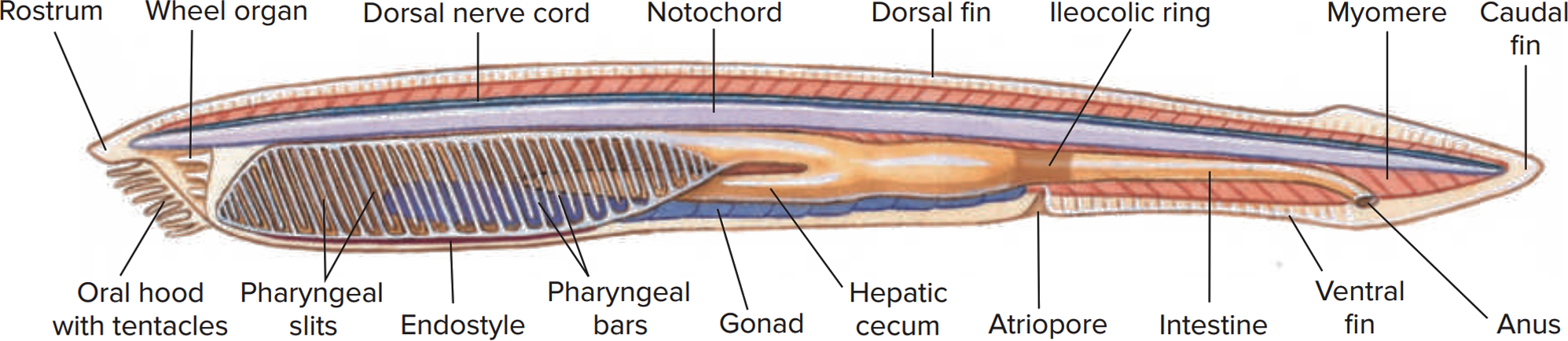
The pharyngeal slits of the lancelet are believed to be homologous to the splanchnocranium.

Among early gnathostomes, the first or first two pharyngeal arches came to make up the jaws and the second (and to a lesser degree, the third) came to make up the hyoid apparatus. Among fishes, the remaining arches remained as the gills, while among tetrapods they were lost or highly reduced.

== Divisions ==
=== Mandibular arch ===
The mandibular arch comprises the ancestral portions of the upper and lower jaws. Ancestrally, these elements are the palatoquadrate and Meckel's cartilage, which are only rarely fully ossified among vertebrates. Developmental evidence suggests that the palatoquadrate and Meckel's cartilage represent serial homologues of the epibranchial and the ceratobranchial, respectively. The joint between the two cartilages ancestrally represents the jaw joint; in mammals, it has been modified and serves as a portion of the middle ear.

- Meckel's cartilage/Meckelian
  - Articular/Malleus
  - Retroarticular
  - Mentomeckelian/Mentomandibular
- Palatoquadrate
  - Quadrate/Incus
  - Epipterygoid/Alisphenoid
  - Metapterygoid
  - Autopalatine

=== Hyoid arch ===
Ancestrally, the hyoid arch helps to support the floor of the mouth. It has undergone significant modification in different clades. In teleosts, the arch allows for cranial kinesis; in basal tetrapods, the arch helped to support the tongue (as part of the hyoid apparatus) as well as bracing the skull, later forming part of the middle ear. In mammals, the hyoid arch contains Reichert's cartilage.

- Epihyal/Hyomandibula
  - Columella/Stapes
  - Extracolumella/Tympanohyal
- Interhyal
- Symplectic
- Ceratohyal
  - Stylohyal
- Hypohyal
- Basihyal

=== Branchial arch I-V ===
In chondrichthyans and teleosts, elements of these arches form distinct elements, divided into the pharyngobranchials, epibranchials, ceratobranchials, hypobranchials, and basibranchials.

In tetrapods, elements of the first and second branchial arch form part of the hyoid apparatus. Elements of the second and third branchial arches may make up the laryngeal and thyroid cartilages; the fourth and fifth arches are absent in tetrapods.

=== Branchial arch VI ===
Paleontological evidence suggests that branchial arch VI may have been incorporated into the shoulder girdle in early placoderms, and by extension in later gnathostomes. No individual bones of the gnathostome shoulder girdle are thought to have a branchial arch origin, as embryological evidence indicates that the endochondral bones of the shoulder develop from the trunk mesoderm. Rather, patterns of musculature and vascularisation in the pectoral girdle are thought to be inherited from the branchial arch.

== See also ==
- Chondrocranium
- Dermatocranium
- Endocranium
- Neurocranium
