= Quadrate bone =

Skull bone

A schematic of an anapsid skull showing the location of major dermal bones of the upper skull, including the quadrate bone (q).

The quadrate bone is a skull bone in most tetrapods, including amphibians, sauropsids (reptiles, birds), and early synapsids, as well as in many actinopterygian and actinistian fish. The quadrate bone forms the lower jaw articulation in all vertebrates except mammals. In mammals it is known as the incus and is located in the middle ear.

== Evolution ==
The quadrate has its evolutionary origin as a part of the palatoquadrate, the dorsal cartilaginous portion of the mandibular arch; as such, it is a part of the splanchnocranium. The rear part of the palatoquadrate (the pars quadrata) articulates with Meckel's cartilage, forming the primary jaw joint; this condition is retained among cartilaginous fishes.

Python skull with quadrate colored red. The quadrate is particularly elongated in snakes to facilitate cranial kinesis.

Among primitive gnathostomes, the palatoquadrate ossifies as a single bone, and the quadrate is therefore not present. The quadrate separates from the palatoquadrate to become a distinct bone in acanthodians, actinopterygians, coelacanths, and tetrapods. This occurs via convergent evolution, with the quadrate having multiple evolutionary origins. Ancestrally, the quadrate fulfills the same function as the pars quadrata—namely, forming the primary jaw joint via articulating with Meckel's cartilage (ossified as the articular).

Among fishes, the quadrate typically articulates with the metapterygoid, and sometimes with the hyomandibula. In teleosts, it becomes sutured to the ectopterygoid.

In most tetrapods, the quadrate bone connects to the quadratojugal, squamosal, and pterygoid bones in the skull, and forms the upper part of the jaw joint. The lower jaw articulates at the articular bone, located at the rear end of the lower jaw.

In certain extinct reptiles, the variation and stability of the morphology of the quadrate bone has helped paleontologists in the species-level taxonomy and identification of mosasaur squamates and spinosaurine dinosaurs. In squamates and some dinosaurs, the quadrate is articulated at both ends and mobile. In snakes, the quadrate bone has become elongated and very mobile, and contributes greatly to their ability to swallow very large prey items.

=== In mammals ===
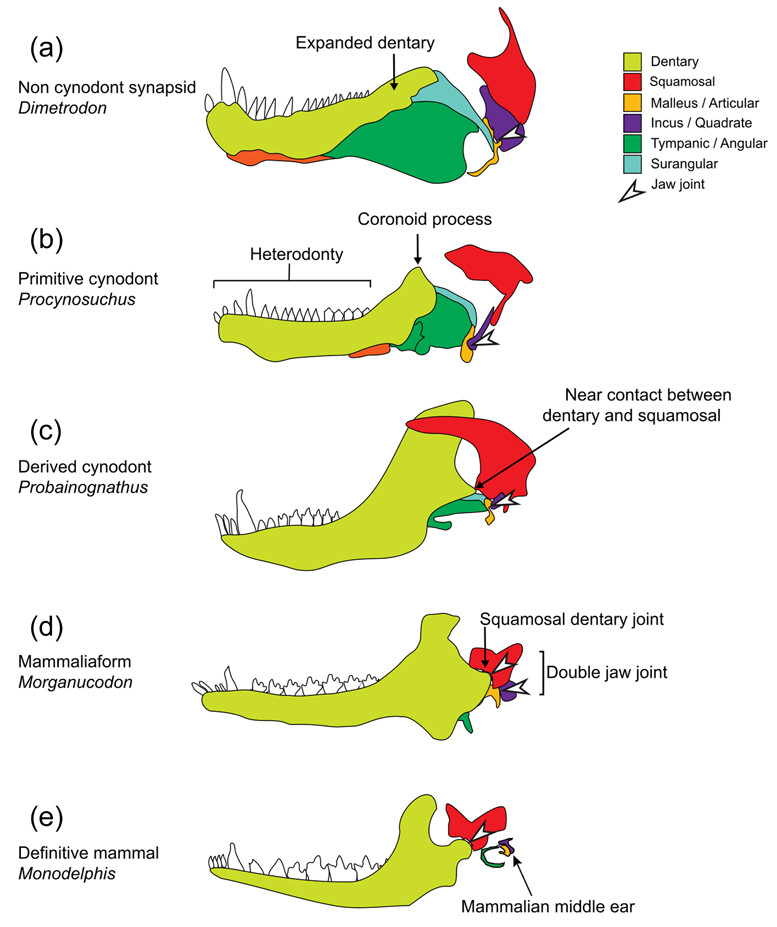
Diagram showing synapsid jaw evolution from early "pelycosaur" synapsids to modern mammals, showing the transformation of the quadrate into the incus

In mammals, the quadrate bone has migrated to the middle ear to become an ossicle, and is known as the incus. It retains its articulation with the articular, which has transformed into the malleus. The incus also articulates with the stapes, which is homologous to the reptilian and amphibian columella. This arrangement is known as the definitive mammalian middle ear, and is a defining characteristic of mammals. Transitional fossils record this transformation, including a stage where the middle ear ossicles remain attached to the lower jaw via an ossified Meckel's cartilage.

In pig embryos, the mandible ossifies on the side of Meckel's cartilage, while the posterior part of that cartilage is ossified into the incus. In later development, this portion detaches from the rest of the cartilage and migrates into the middle ear.
