= Viscerocranium =

Viscerocranium may refer to one of two related concepts:

- In human anatomy and development, viscerocranium usually refers to elements of the skull that are not part of the braincase (as opposed to the neurocranium), and which can be subdivided into:
  - The membranous viscerocranium, comprising the facial skeleton
  - The cartilaginous viscerocranium, comprising the splanchnocranium
- In comparative anatomy of vertebrates, viscerocranium usually refers specifically to the splanchnocranium (as opposed to the chondrocranium and dermatocranium)
