= Epipterygoid =

Bone of the head or neck

Skull of Eunotosaurus. Epipterygoid is shown in medium blue and labeled ep.

The epipterygoid is a paired cranial bone present in many osteichthyans including tetrapods. It acts as a vertical strut connecting the pterygoid bone of the palate to the outer surface of the braincase or the underside of the skull roof. The epipterygoid is an endochondral bone, derived from the cartilage of the branchial arches.

== Evolution ==
The epipterygoid is part of the splanchnocranium, and as such it originated as a portion of the first gill arch in basal chordates. The epibranchial element of the first gill arch evolved into the palatoquadrate; in osteichthyes, this element typically remains mostly cartilaginous. However, the anteriormost portion of the palatoquadrate does ossify, and becomes the epipterygoid.

In squamates, the epipterygoid generally has a slender rod-like shape, and is also known as the columella cranii. Though present in many extinct archosaurs, it has been independently lost in modern crocodilians and birds.

The epipterygoid is considered to be homologous to the alisphenoid bone of mammals.
