= Meckel's cartilage =

Cartilaginous precursor of the jaw

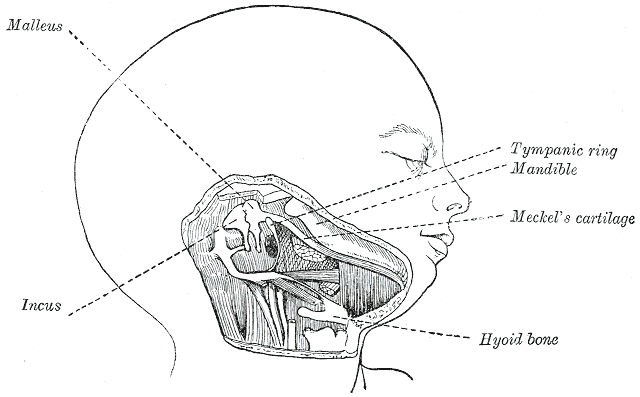
- Head and neck of a human fetus at eighteen weeks, with Meckel's cartilage and hyoid bar exposed.

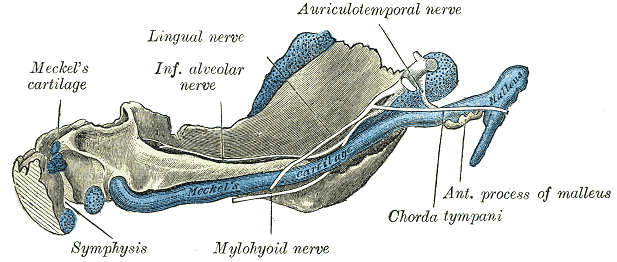
- Mandible of human fetus 95 mm (3.7 in) long. Inner aspect. Nuclei of cartilage stippled.

Details
- Precursor: First pharyngeal arch
- Gives rise to: malleus

Identifiers
- Latin: cartilago arcus pharyngei primi
- TE: cartilage_by_E4.0.3.3.3.1.3 E4.0.3.3.3.1.3

In humans, the cartilaginous bar of the mandibular arch is formed by what are known as Meckel's cartilages (right and left; also known as Meckelian cartilages), above which the incus and malleus are located. Meckel's cartilage arises from the first pharyngeal arch and is a part of the splanchnocranium.

The dorsal end of each cartilage is connected with the ear-capsule and is ossified to form the malleus; the ventral ends meet each other in the region of the mandibular symphysis, but remain cartilaginous in most animals. The mandible itself is formed from dermal bone that sheaths Meckel's cartilage.

The intervening part of the cartilage disappears; the portion immediately adjacent to the malleus is replaced by fibrous membrane, which constitutes the sphenomandibular ligament, while from the connective tissue covering the remainder of the cartilage the greater part of the mandible is ossified.

Johann Friedrich Meckel, the Younger discovered this cartilage in 1820.

== Evolution ==
Meckel's cartilage is a piece of cartilage from which the mandibles (lower jaws) of vertebrates evolved. Originally it was the lower of two cartilages which supported the first branchial arch in early fish (the other being the palatoquadrate). Then it grew longer and stronger, and acquired muscles capable of closing the developing jaw. Embryonic evidence suggests it represents the serial homologue of the ceratobranchials.

In early jawed fish and in chondrichthyans (cartilaginous fish such as sharks), Meckel's cartilage continued to be the main component of the lower jaw. Among acanthodians and early placoderms, Meckel's cartilage ossifies. In later placoderms, only the posteriormost and sometimes anteriormost portions of the cartilage ossified (the articular and the mentomandibular, respectively).

However, in the adult forms of osteichthyans (bony fish) and their descendants (amphibians, reptiles, birds, and mammals), the cartilage is covered in bone – although in their embryos the jaw initially develops as Meckel's cartilage. In all tetrapods the cartilage partially ossifies (changes to bone) at the rear end of the jaw and becomes the articular bone, which forms part of the jaw joint in all tetrapods except mammals.

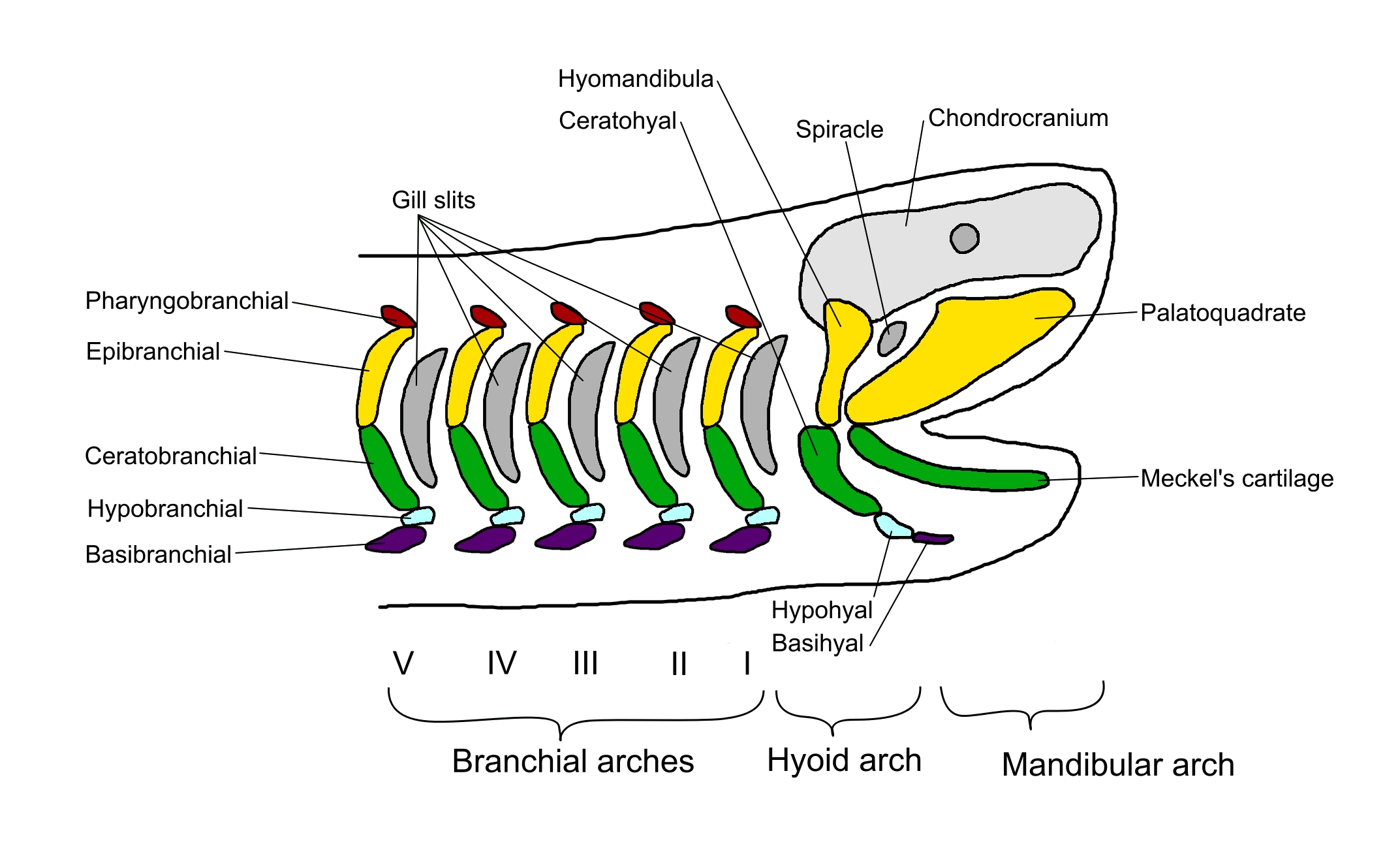
Diagram of the branchial arches in an ancestral gnathostome. Meckel's cartilage forms the ventral part of the mandibular arch.

In some fish, amphibians, and lizards, a paired bony element known as the mentomeckelian is present near the mandibular symphysis. This is considered to represent an ossification of the anterior part of Meckel's cartilage, though the element in amphibians may have a different origin.

In non-mammaian synapsids, the unossified portion of Meckel's cartilage remained sheathed inside of the mandible. During the evolution of the mammalian middle ear, however, the articular and prearticular separated from the jaw, moving inward. In some extinct mammal groups like eutriconodonts, Meckel's cartilage still connected otherwise entirely modern ear bones to the jaw. In those taxa, Meckel's cartilage also formed the interior of the dentary; its posterior end exited the dentary through a hole on the medial side known as the meckelian groove.

Less commonly, in some gobiconodonts, Meckel's cartilage ossifies along its length.

Meckel's cartilage is believed to have connected the middle ear to the jaw in the common ancestor of all living mammals. In modern mammals, however, the cartilage generally separates, detaching the middle ear from the jaw, although the connection is still present in some fully-grown juveniles.

== Additional images ==
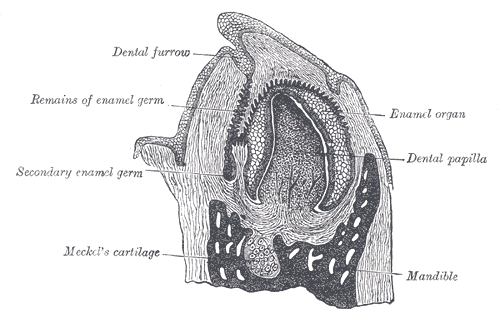
Vertical section of the mandible of an early human fetus. X 25.
