= Hyoid apparatus =

Bones that suspend the tongue and larynx

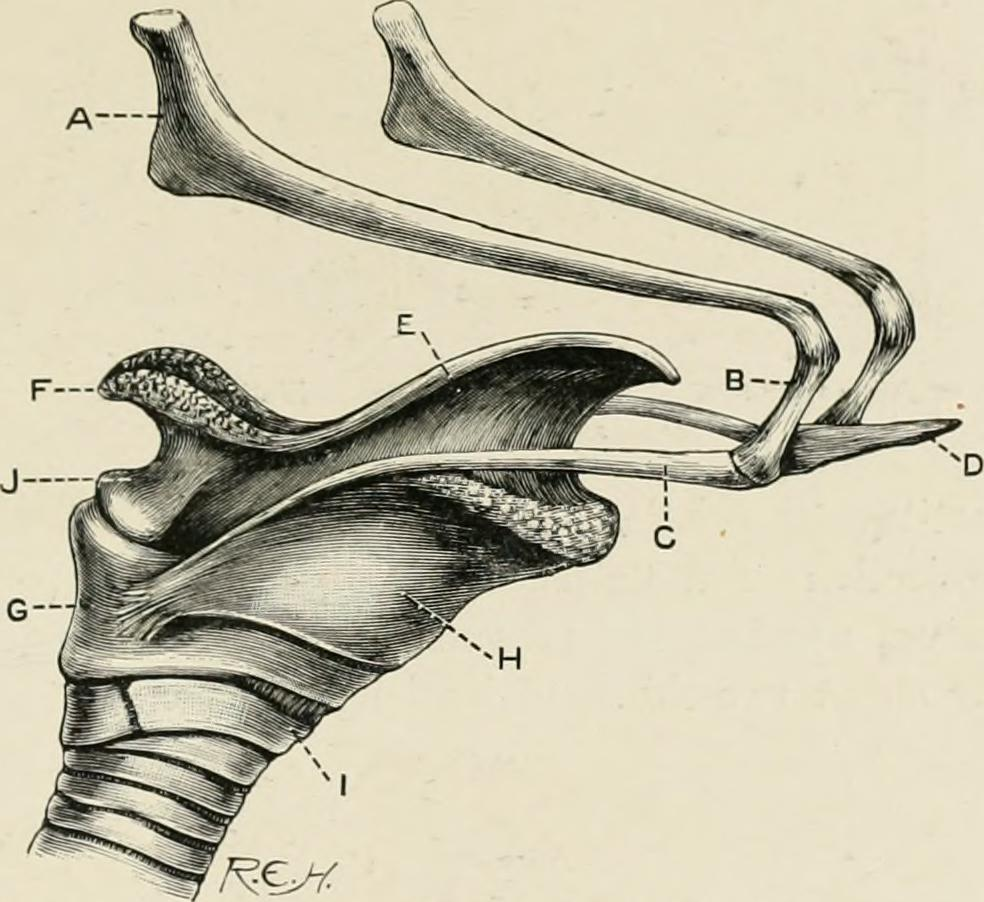
The hyoid apparatus of a horse. A–D: hyoid apparatus (D: basihyoid), E: epiglottis, F: glottis, G–J: cartilages of the trachea.

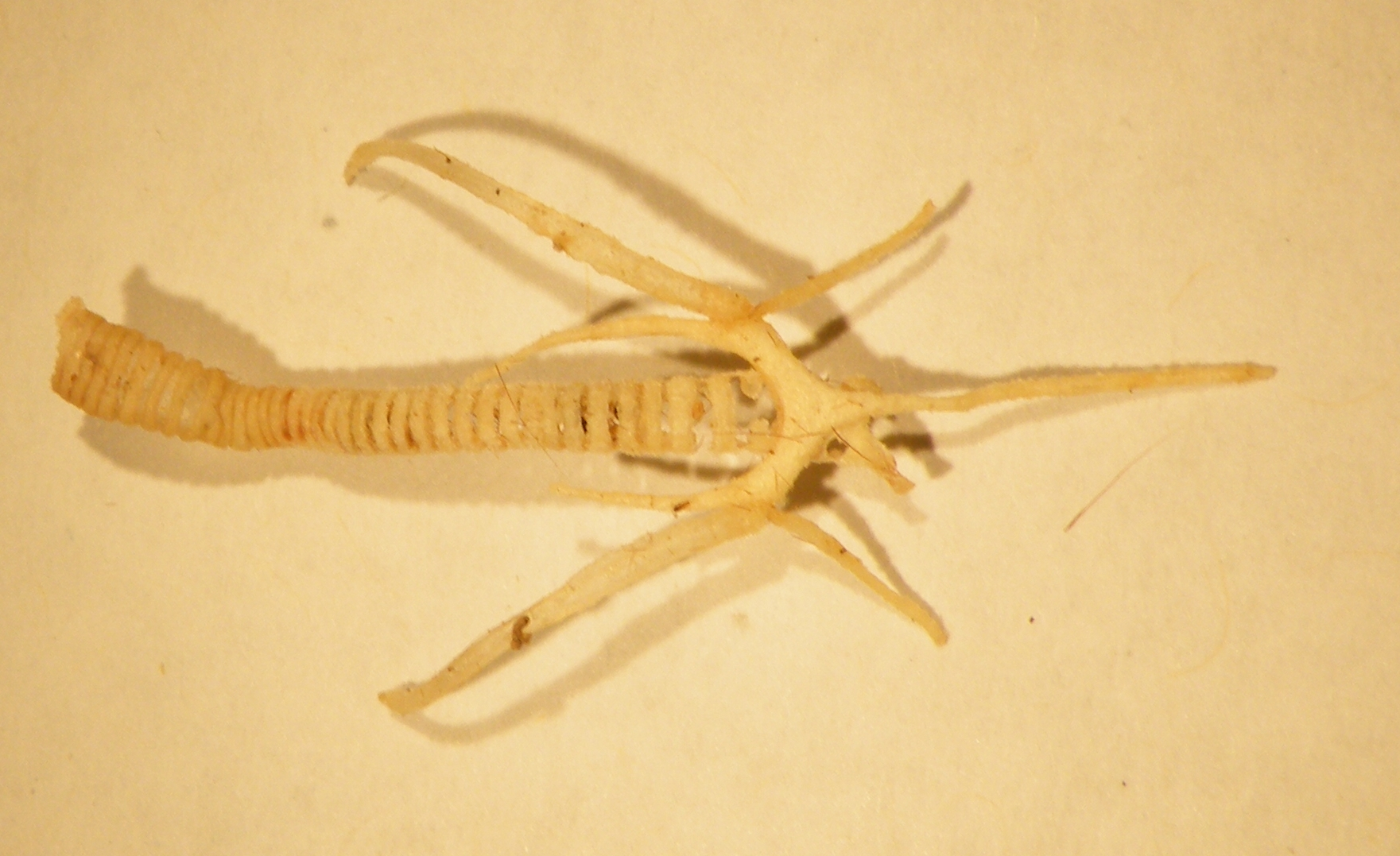
Hyoid apparatus of a leopard gecko, Euplepharis maculatus, with attached tracheal rings (ventral view, anterior towards the right)

The hyoid apparatus is the collective term used in veterinary anatomy for the bones which suspend the tongue and larynx. In mammals, it typically consists of a single midline element, the basihyal, with a pair of elements, the thyrohyals, posteriorly, and a pair of chains of elements, the anterior cornua, linking the hyoid to the skull: the ceratohyal, epihyal, and stylohyal, as well as the tympanohyal, which is anchored to the petrosal bone. The hyoid apparatus resembles the shape of a trapeze, or a bent letter "H". The basihyoid bone lies within the muscle at the base of the tongue. The typical arrangement of the mammalian hyoid apparatus arose in Mammaliaformes; non-mammaliaform synapsids show only a simple pair of rod-like bones that were presumably connected to a cartilaginous basihyal at their anterior ends.

In anthropoid primates, including humans, the anterior cornu (which comprises the ceratohyal, stylohyal, and stylohyal in other mammals) is reduced and consists only of the ceratohyal. In humans, the hyoid apparatus is treated as a single bone, the hyoid, and the elements are often fused together, though the thyrohyals, which form the greater cornua of the human hyoid, often remain separate even in elderly individuals.

In birds, the hyoid apparatus comprises the basihyal, urohyal, paraglossalia, ceratobranchials, and epibranchials. The ceratobranchials are the only consistently ossified elements; the other elements may be cartilaginous or ossified.
