= Palatoquadrate =

Fish anatomical structure

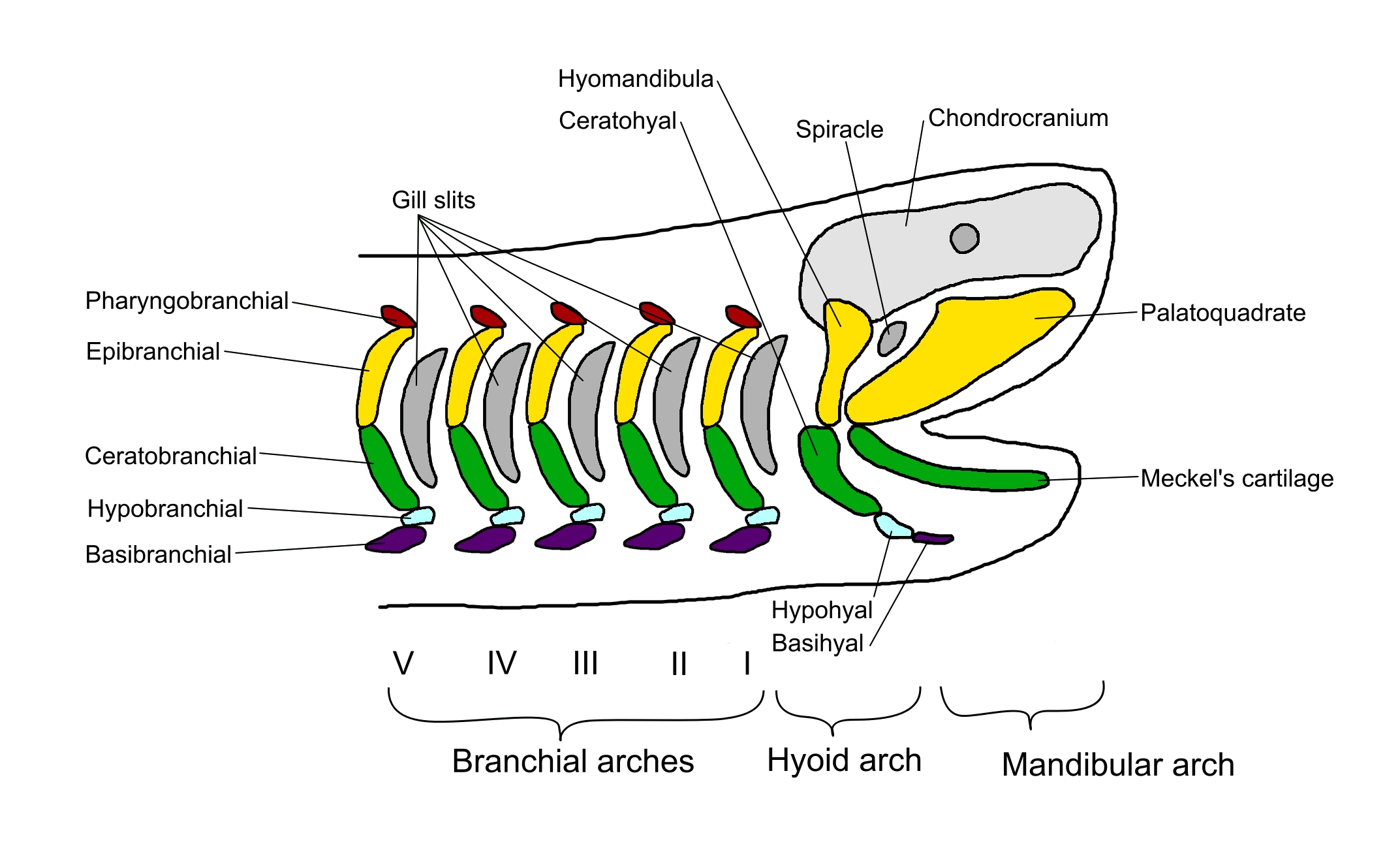
Diagram of the branchial arches in an ancestral gnathostome. The palatoquadrate is the dorsal part of the mandibular arch.

In some fishes, the palatoquadrate is the dorsal component of the mandibular arch, the ventral one being Meckel's cartilage. The palatoquadrate forms from splanchnocranium.

== Anatomy ==
The palatoquadrate is a paired element that forms the upper part of the mandibular arch, and may be cartilaginous (sometimes as calcified cartilage) or partially or completely ossified. It is roughly triangular in shape; the anterior point is referred to as the pars autopalatina, the posterior as the pars quadrata, and the ascending process as the pars metapterygoidea. These parts may ossify as the autopalatine, the quadrate, and the metapterygoid, respectively.

The palatoquadrate articulates dorsally with the ethmoid and sphenoid regions, as well as the otic region, of the chondrocranium and, at the pars quadrata, with Meckel's cartilage; it may also articulate with the hyomandibula and other elements of the hyoid arch.

In osteichthyes, the palatoquadrate is covered by dermal bone. The medial and ventral surface is covered by the ectopterygoid, pterygoid (=entopterygoid in fishes), palatine (=dermopalatine in fishes), and (when present) the predermopalatine. Laterally, it is covered by the maxilla, lacrimal, jugal, postorbital, squamosal, preopercle, and quadratojugal.

Swedish palaeontologist Erik Jarvik proposed in the 1950s that the palatoquadrate evolved as a fusion of the mandibular arch (which would make up the pars quadrata and pars metapterygoidea) and a hypothetical premandibular arch (which would make up the pars autopalatina). This hypothesis is not supported by current evidence.

== Evolution ==
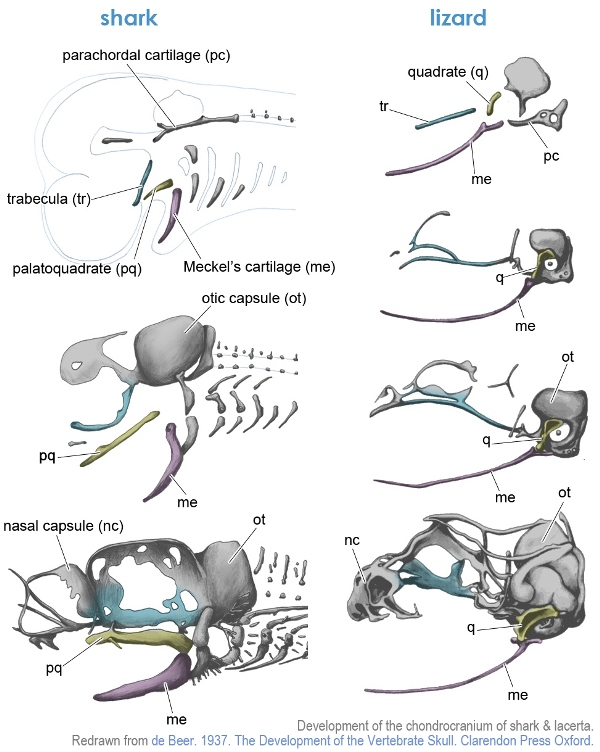
Development of the skulls of the shark (left) and lizard (right). Palatoquadrate shown in yellow and labeled pq.

The palatoquadrate is believed to have evolved from the branchial arches; it is a serial homologue of the epibranchial. Ancestrally, the element is cartilaginous; it persists as a distinct cartilaginous element in chondrichthyans, placoderms, and chondrosteans.

In early acanthodians, the element ossifies as a single bone, divided into the pars autopalatina, the pars quadrata, and the pars metapterygoidea. Later acanthodians ossify the palatoquadrate as two elements (lacking the autopalatine), and in later still acanthodians, the palatoquadrate ossifies into three elements: the quadrate, the metapterygoid, and the autopalatine.

=== Actinopterygii ===
Among primitive actinopterygians, the element is often ossified as a single element, or as three distinct elements (sometimes joined by a cartilaginous bridge). In modern actinopterygians, the following distinct patterns are found:

1. Quadrate exclusively ossified, remainder of palatoquadrate cartilaginous;
2. Palatoquadrate completely ossified;
3. Quadrate and metapterygoid ossified, with metapterygoid incorporating the pars autopalatina;
4. Quadrate and autopalatine ossified, with metapterygoid absent;
5. Quadrate, autopalatine, and metapterygoid each individually ossified

=== Sarcopterygii ===
Fossilised palatoquadrates of the tetrapodomorph Rhizodopsis

In lungfish, the palatoquadrate fuses to the cartilage of the neurocranium but does not ossify. In coelacanths the palatoquadrate ossifies as the quadrate, metapterygoid, and autopalatine except for in the earliest members of the group, wherein the entire patoquadrate is co-ossified.

Among basal tetrapodomorphs such as Eusthenopteron, the palatoquadrate ossifies as a single unit.

In tetrapods, the palatoquadrate typically remains largely unossified, though it is observable in embryology. Ancestrally, five processes were present: pterygoid (anterolateral), ascending (dorsomedial), otic (dorsoposterior), quadrate (posterolateral), and basipterygoid (ventral). The pars autopalatina fuses to the cartilage of the ethmoid region and becomes less connected to the pars metapterygoidea. The pars metapterygoidea fuses instead to the otic region save for the basal (=ascending) process, which ossifies into the epipterygoid (known in mammals as the alisphenoid). The pars quadrata part ossifies into the quadrate (known in mammals as the incus).

A cartilaginous palatoquadrate is present among lissamphibians, where it generally forms a columnar structure contacting the otic region lateral via an otic process. Its ascending process articulates with the pila antotica in salamanders; this process is lost during development among frogs, and does not develop among caecilians. Among caecilians the palatoquadrate ossifies, sometimes fusing with a dermal bone (possibly the quadratojugal). The so-called pterygoid process of the palatoquadrate (=pars metapterygoidea) is often separate from the palatoquadrate; when the elements co-ossify, they are known as the pterygoquadrate. In the Surinam horned frog, the palatoquadrate is entirely ossified.

== See also ==
- Hyomandibula
- Fish anatomy
