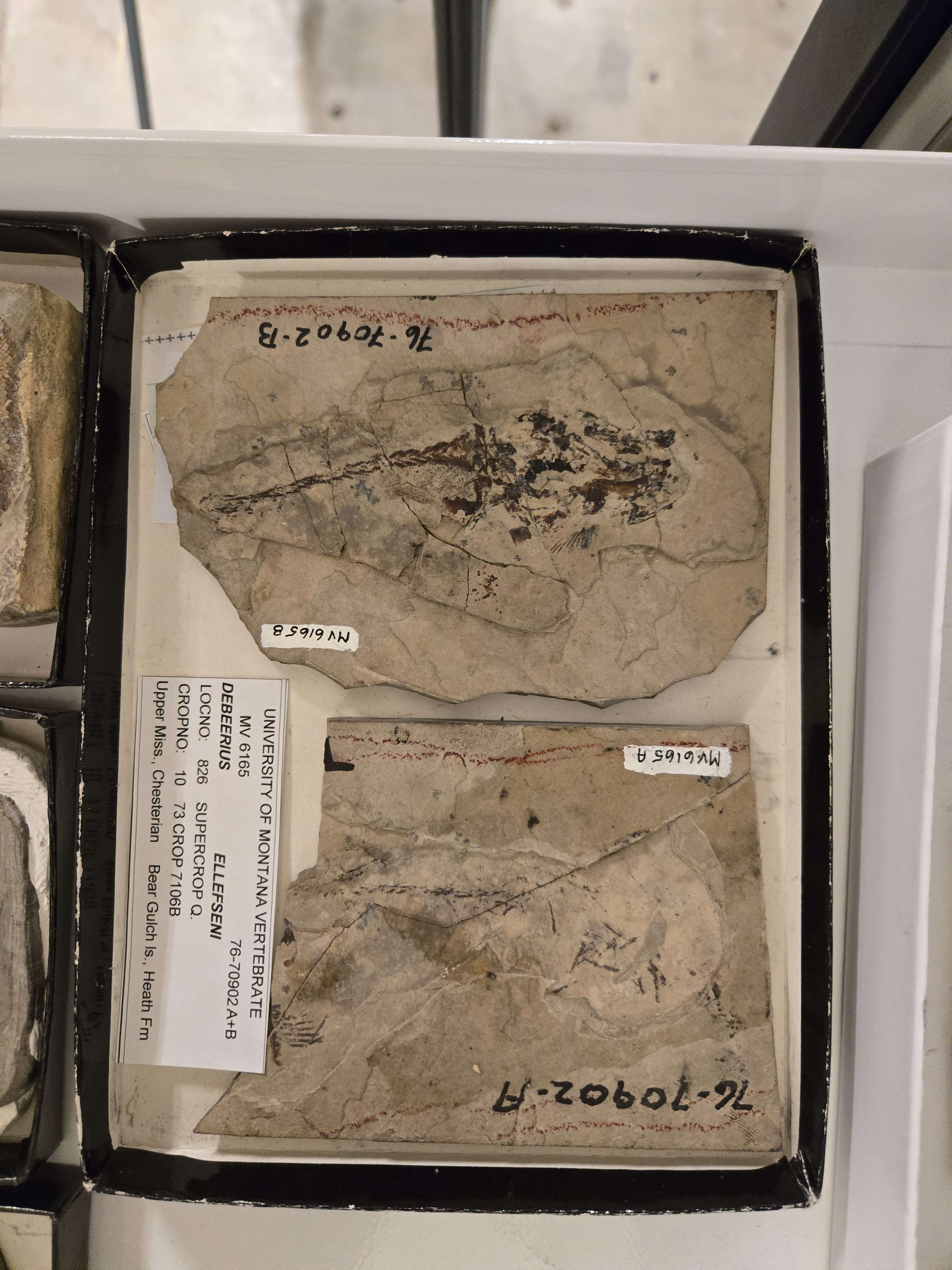
- Part and counterpart of a complete D. ellefseni specimen
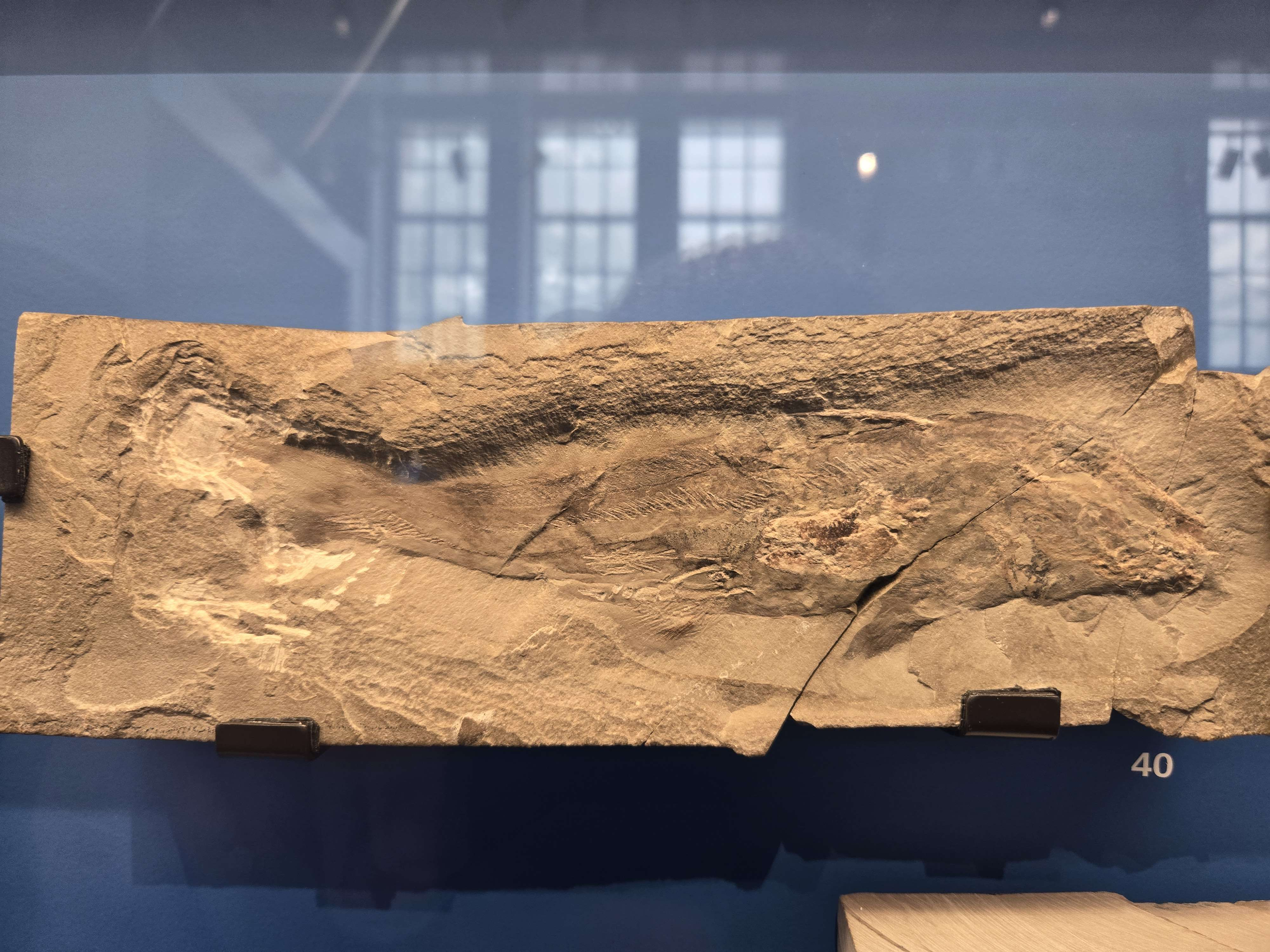
- D. ellefseni fossil with preserved color patterns, exhibited at the ROM

Scientific classification
- Kingdom: Animalia
- Phylum: Chordata
- Class: Chondrichthyes
- Subclass: Holocephali
- Order: †Debeeriiformes
- Family: †Debeeriidae
- Genus: †Debeerius; Grogan & Lund, 2000
- Species: †D. ellefseni

Binomial name
- †Debeerius ellefseni Grogan & Lund, 2000

= Debeerius =

Debeerius Temporal range: Mississippian

Extinct genus of cartilaginous fish

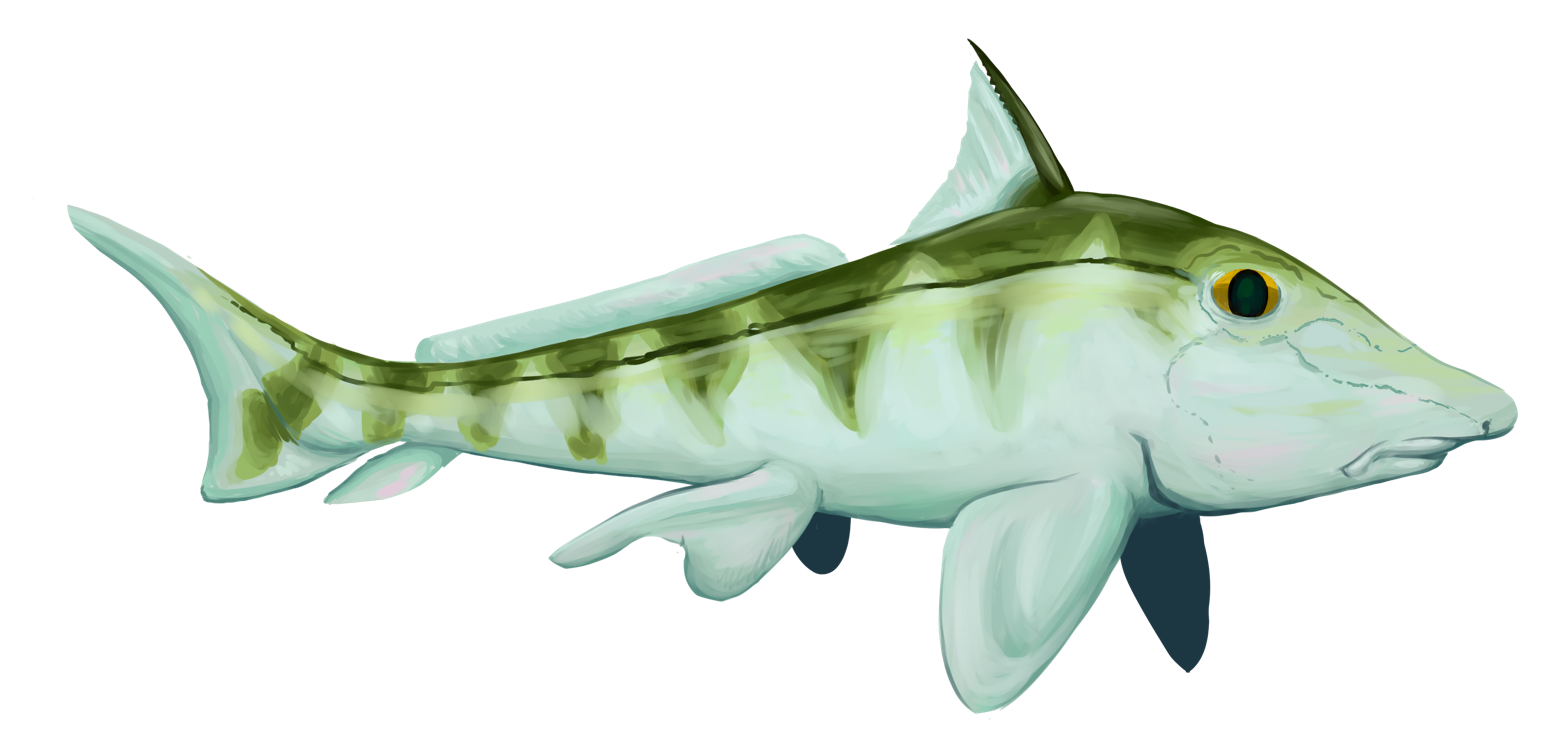
Life restoration of D. ellefseni

Debeerius is a genus of chondrichthyan from the Mississippian age Bear Gulch Limestone of Montana, United States. It is named after Gavin de Beer. One species, D. ellefseni, is known, which is preserved in very fine detail. Melanin preserved in fossils of D. ellefseni indicates it possessed dark stripes down the length of its body. The jaw suspension of Debeerius was autodiastylic (two jointed), and it is considered a member of the subclass Holocephali.
