= Hyomandibula =

Set of bones in most fishes that plays a role in suspending the jaws

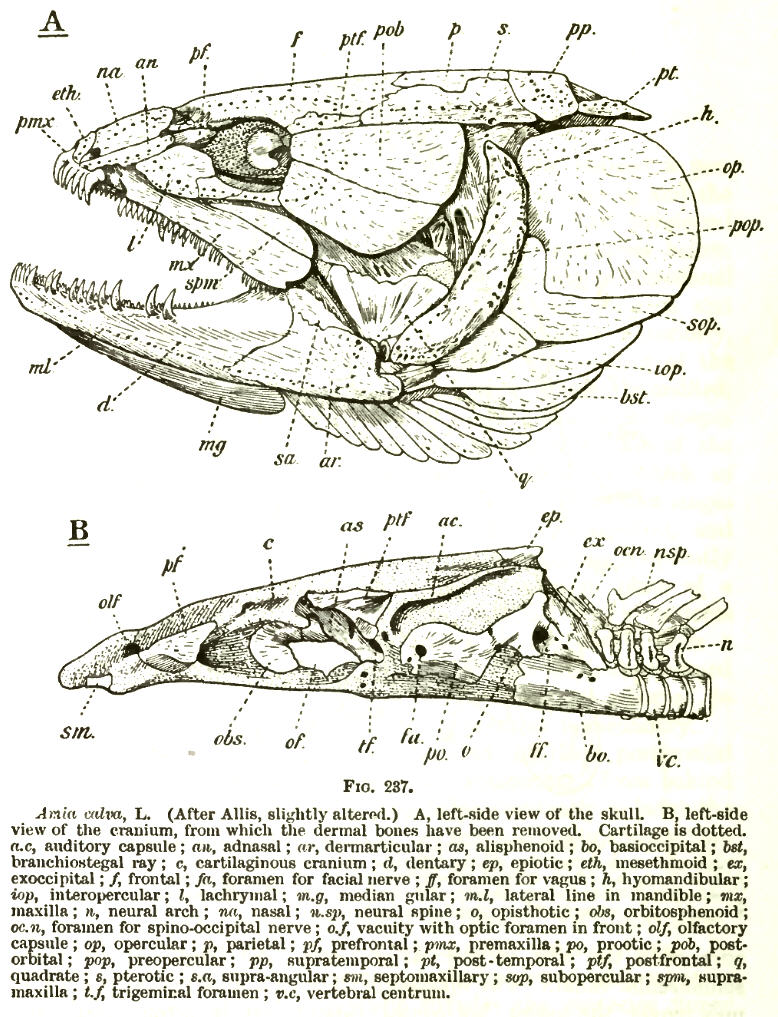
Skeletal head of an Amia calva. Hyamandibular marked h, top image, upper right corner

The hyomandibula, commonly referred to as hyomandibular [bone] (Latin: os hyomandibulare, from Greek: hyoeides, "upsilon-shaped" (υ), and Latin: mandibula, "jawbone"), is a set of bones that is found in the hyoid region in most fishes. It usually plays a role in suspending the jaws and/or operculum (teleostomi only). It is commonly suggested that in tetrapods (land animals), the hyomandibula evolved into the columella (stapes).

== Evolutionary context ==
In jawless fishes, a series of gills opened behind the mouth, and these gills became supported by cartilaginous elements. The first set of these elements surrounded the mouth to form the jaw. There is ample evidence that vertebrate jaws are homologous to the gill arches of jawless fishes. The upper portion of the second embryonic arch supporting the gill became the hyomandibular bone of jawed fishes, which supports the skull and therefore links the jaw to the cranium.

When vertebrates found their way onto land, the hyomandibula, with its location near the ear, began to function as a sound amplifier beside its function to support the skull. As evolution later attached the cranium of terrestrial vertebrates to the rest of the skull, the hyomandibula lost its supportive function and became an interior organ, the stapes, and thus its secondary function had become its primary function.

== See also ==
- Fish anatomy
- Palatoquadrate
