= Branchial arch =

Bony "loops" present in fish, which support the gills

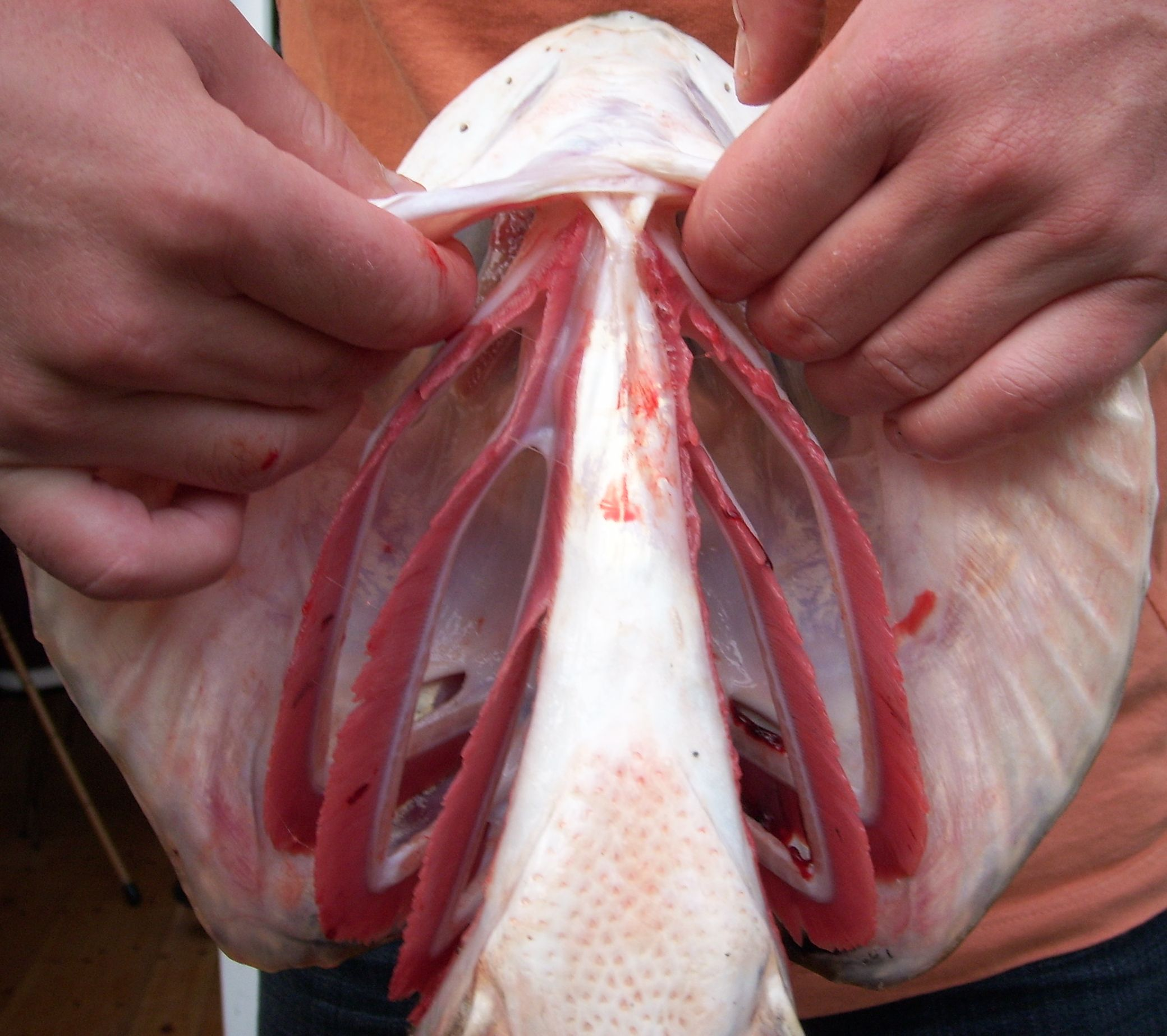
Gill arches supporting the gills in a pike

Branchial arches or gill arches are a series of paired bony/cartilaginous "loops" behind the throat (pharyngeal cavity) of fish, which support the fish gills. As chordates, all vertebrate embryos develop pharyngeal arches, though the eventual fate of these arches varies between taxa. In all jawed fish (gnathostomes), the first arch pair (mandibular arches) develops into the jaw, the second gill arches (the hyoid arches) develop into the hyomandibular complex (which supports the back of the jaw and the front of the gill series), and the remaining posterior arches (simply called branchial arches) support the gills. In tetrapods, a mostly terrestrial clade evolved from lobe-finned fish, many pharyngeal arch elements are lost, including the gill arches. In amphibians and reptiles, only the oral jaws and a hyoid apparatus remains, and in mammals and birds the hyoid is simplified further to support the tongue and floor of the mouth. In mammals, the first and second pharyngeal arches also give rise to the auditory ossicles.

Most vertebrates are aquatic and breathe with gills, where water comes in contact for exchanging dissolved oxygen before flowing out through a series of openings (gill slits) to the outside. Each gill is supported by a cartilaginous or bony gill arch, which helps to maintain the gill's surface area. Bony fish (osteichthyans, mostly teleost ray-finned fish) have four pairs of arches, cartilaginous fish (chondrichthyans) have five to seven pairs, and the more basal jawless fish ("agnathans") have up to seven. The Cambrian ancestors of vertebrates no doubt had more gill arches, as some of their chordate relatives have more than 50 pairs of gills.

In amphibians and some primitive bony fish, the larvae bear external gills branching out from the gill arches. These regress upon adulthood, their function taken over by the gills proper in fish, or by lungs (which are homologous to swim bladders) and cutaneous respiration in most amphibians. Some neotenic amphibians (such as the axolotl) retain the external larval gills in adulthood, the complex internal gill system as seen in fish apparently being irrevocably lost very early in the evolution of tetrapods.

== Function ==
The branchial system is typically used for respiration and/or feeding. Many fish have modified posterior gill arches into pharyngeal jaws, often equipped with specialized pharyngeal teeth for handling particular prey items (long, sharp teeth in carnivorous moray eels compared to broad, crushing teeth in durophagous black carp). In amphibians and reptiles, the hyoid arch is modified for similar reasons. It is often used in buccal pumping and often plays a role in tongue protrusion for prey capture. In species with highly specialized ballistic tongue movements such as chameleons or some plethodontid salamanders, the hyoid system is highly modified for this purpose, while it is often hypertrophied in species which use suction feeding. Species such as snakes and monitor lizards, whose tongue has evolved into a purely sensory organ, often have very reduced hyoid systems.

== Components ==
The primitive arrangement is 7 (possibly 8) arches, each consisting of the same series of paired (left and right) elements. order from dorsal-most (highest) to ventral-most (lowest), these elements are the pharyngobranchial, epibranchial, ceratobranchial, hypobranchial, and basibranchial. The pharyngobranchials may articulate with the neurocranium, while the left and right basibranchials connect to each other (often fusing into a single bone). When part of the hyoid arch, the names of the bones are altered by replacing "-branchial" with "-hyal", thus "ceratobranchial" becomes "ceratohyal".

- The Basihyals and Basibranchials lie at the midline of the lower edge of the throat. Almost all modern chondrichthyans have a single midline basihyal, as do many teleosts, lungfish, and tetrapodomorphs. In tetrapods, the basihyal is modified into a structure known as the hyoid bone, which provides muscle attachment for the tongue, pharynx, and larynx. Basibranchials, which are most common in osteichthyans, have the form of one or more rod-like bones projecting backwards along the midline of the throat.
- The Ceratohyals and Ceratobranchials lie above their respective basi- components, slanting backwards and upwards. They are often the largest bony components of the gill system, as well as the most essential and abundant components. Small connecting bones known as Hypophyals or Hypobranchials may link the basi- and cerato- components, and hypobranchials in particular are common among all types of fish. Paired hypophyals are characteristic of living osteichthyans. Living chondrichthyans lack hypohyals, though several extinct forms are known to have had them.
- The Epihyals and Epibranchials lie above their respective cerato- components, slanting forwards, upwards, and often inwards. Along with the ceratohyals and ceratobranchials, they are also essential components of the gill system, found in every fish. In filter-feeding fish, the epibranchials often host gill rakers, specialized spines projecting backwards to trap plankton. The epihyal is more commonly known as the hyomandibula, which is homologous to the sound-sensitive stapes (sometimes known as the columnella) of tetrapods.
- The Pharhyngobranchials are the most dorsal bony elements of the gill system, connecting to the upper extent of the epibranchials. Living chondrichthyans have large pharyngobranchials which lean backwards and upwards. Osteichthyans, on the other hand, have two different types of pharyngobranchials: Suprapharyngobranchials are toothless structures similar to those of chondrichthyans, while Infrapharyngobranchials often possess teeth and lean inwards and forwards, forming the roof of the throat. A hyoid equivalent of the pharyngobranchial, the Pharyngohyal, is only found in living holocephalans, also known as chimaeras.

== Amniotes ==
Amniotes do not have gills. The gill arches form as pharyngeal arches during embryogenesis, and lay the basis of essential structures such as jaws, the thyroid gland, the larynx, the columella (corresponding to the stapes in mammals) and in mammals, the malleus and incus. Studies on placoderms also show that the shoulder girdle also originated from gill arches.
