= Alligator (disambiguation) =

An alligator is a large crocodilian reptile in the Alligatoridae family.

Alligator may also refer to:

== Alligator products ==
- Alligator leather
- Alligator meat

== Animals ==
- Alligator Blood (horse), racehorse
- Alligator gar, North American freshwater fish
- Alligator lizard (disambiguation)
- Alligator snapping turtle, North American freshwater turtle
- Sewer alligator

== Media ==
=== Film ===
- Alligator (film), 1980 horror film
- Alligator II: The Mutation, 1991 American monster horror film
- The Alligator People, 1959 American science-fiction horror film

=== Music ===
- Alligator (Abandon Kansas album), 2015
- Alligator (Leslie West album), 1989
- "Alligator" (Of Monsters and Men song), 2019
- "Alligator" (Tegan and Sara song), 2009
- Alligator (The National album), 2005
- Alligator, by Brad Gillis, 2000
- "Alligator", by the Grateful Dead from Anthem of the Sun, 1968
- "Alligator", by Monsta X from Take.2 We Are Here, 2019
- "Alligator", by Paul McCartney from New, 2013
- "Alligator Bogaloo", 1967 album by jazz saxophonist Lou Donaldson
- Alligator Records, record label
- "Alligator Woman", 1982 album by American funk band Cameo
- The Alligator, a fad dance mentioned in the 1962 song "Land of a Thousand Dances"

=== Print ===
- Alligator (book), a parody of Ian Fleming's James Bond novels
- Alligator Juniper (magazine), literary magazine published by Prescott College, Arizona
- The Independent Florida Alligator, a student newspaper of the University of Florida

== People ==
- "Alligator" or Halpatter Tustenuggee, Seminole leader who witnessed the Dade Massacre in the Second Seminole War
- DJ Aligator (Ali Movasat), Iranian-Danish trance producer and DJ

== Places ==
- Alligator, Mississippi, USA
- Alligator Bay, swamp in Georgia, USA
- Alligator Creek (disambiguation)
- Alligator Lake (Osceola County, Florida), USA
- Alligator Point, Florida, USA
- Alligator Pond, fishing village in Jamaica
- Alligator Reef, Florida Keys National Marine Sanctuary, USA
- Alligator River (disambiguation)
- Lake City, Florida, formerly Alligator, Florida, USA

== Transport ==
- Alligator (1793 ship), a British East Indiaman and general trader
- Aligator 4x4, a military armored car developed by the Slovak Republic in the 1990s
- Alligator (motorcycle), a motorcycle built by Dan Gurney's All American Racers
- Alligator (steamboat), operated in Florida 1888–1909
- Alligator boat, an amphibious tugboat, used in North American forest industry
- Alligator class landing ship, a Type 1171 landing ship used by Russian and Ukrainian Navies
- HMS Alligator, various Royal Navy vessels
- Kamov Ka-52, nicknamed the Alligator, a Russian helicopter
- Landing Vehicle Tracked or "alligator", an amphibious warfare vehicle
- USS Alligator, various US Navy vessels

== Other ==
Snipex Alligator, anti-materiel rifle

== See also ==
- Alligator Alley (disambiguation)
- Crocodile, another large reptile in the order Crocodilia that is often confused with the Alligator
