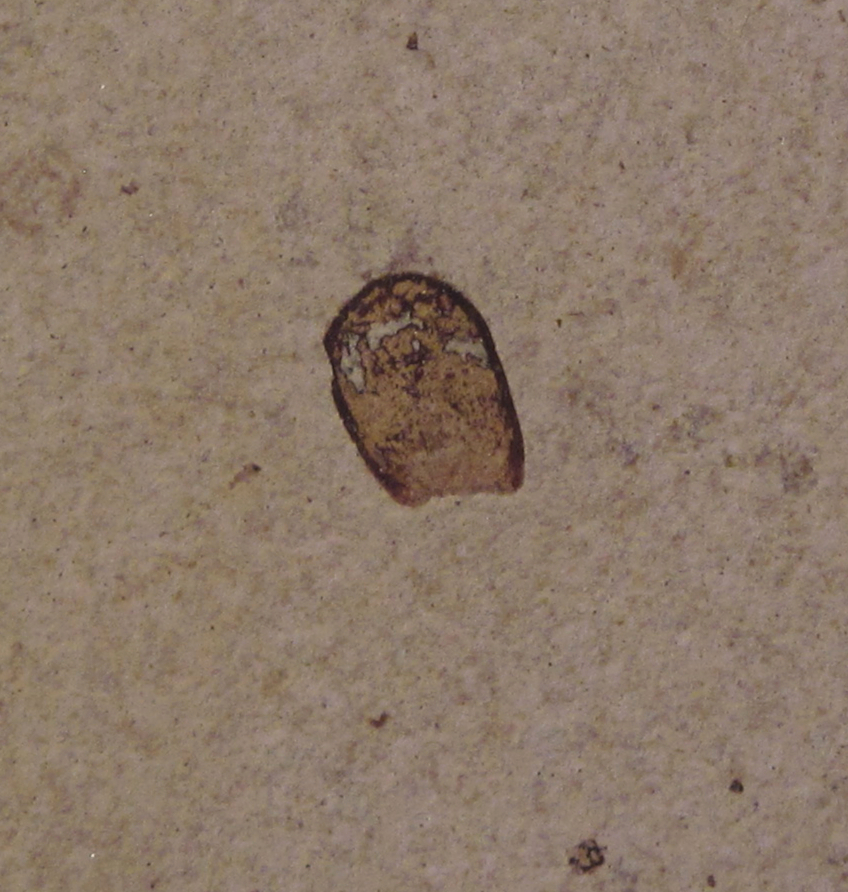
- Amia? hesperia scale, SRIC SR 07-43-13 A

Scientific classification
- Kingdom: Animalia
- Phylum: Chordata
- Class: Actinopterygii
- Clade: Halecomorphi
- Order: Amiiformes
- Family: Amiidae
- Genus: Amia (?)
- Species: †A.? hesperia

Binomial name
- †Amia? hesperia Wilson, 1982

= Amia? hesperia =

Amia? hesperia Temporal range: Ypresian–Ypresian

Extinct species of ray-finned fish

Amia? hesperia is an extinct species of ray-finned fish in the bowfin family, Amiidae. The species is known from fossils found in the early Eocene deposits of northern Washington in the United States and southeastern British Columbia. The species is one of eight fish species identified in the Eocene Okanagan Highlands paleofauna.

The species has been suggested to possibly belong to either Amia or the extinct genus Cyclurus. More recent studies have affirmed it as a basal member of Amia.

== Distribution and paleoenvironment ==
Amia? hesperia fossils have been recovered from two locations in the Eocene Okanagan Highlands, the Allenby Formation of the Princeton, British Columbia region and as isolated scales from the Klondike Mountain Formation in northern Ferry County, Washington. Both sites represent upland lake systems that were surrounded by a warm temperate ecosystem with nearby volcanism. The highlands likely had a mesic upper microthermal to lower mesothermal climate, in which winter temperatures rarely dropped low enough for snow, and which were seasonably equitable. The Okanagan highlands paleoforest surrounding the lakes have been described as precursors to the modern temperate broadleaf and mixed forests of Eastern North America and Eastern Asia. Based on the fossil biotas the lakes were higher and cooler than the coeval coastal forests preserved in the Puget Group and Chuckanut Formation of Western Washington, which are described as lowland tropical forest ecosystems. Estimates of the paleoelevation range between 0.7–1.2 km (0.43–0.75 mi) higher than the coastal forests. This is consistent with the paleoelevation estimates for the lake systems, which range between 1.1–2.9 km (1,100–2,900 m), which is similar to the modern elevation 0.8 km (0.50 mi), but higher.

Estimates of the mean annual temperature have been derived from climate leaf analysis multivariate program (CLAMP) analysis and leaf margin analysis (LMA) of both the Princeton and Republic paleofloras. The CLAMP results after multiple linear regressions for Republic gave a mean annual temperature of approximately 8.0 °C (46.4 °F), while the LMA gave 9.2 ± 2.0 °C (48.6 ± 3.6 °F). Princeton's multiple linear regression CLAMP results gave a slightly lower 5.1 °C (41.2 °F), and the LMA returned a mean annual temperature of 5.1 ± 2.2 °C (41.2 ± 4.0 °F). This is lower than the mean annual temperature estimates given for the coastal Puget Group, which is estimated to have been between 15–18.6 °C (59.0–65.5 °F). The bioclimatic analysis for Republic and Princeton suggest mean annual precipitation amounts of 115 ± 39 cm (45 ± 15 in) and 114 ± 42 cm (45 ± 17 in) respectively.

In addition to the skeleton from above the Princeton chert layers, and the scales from Republic, Wilson (1977) documented isolated "Amiid" scales from the Horsefly Shales near Horsefly and "Pleasant Valley" near Princeton which were collected in 1906 by Lawrence Lambe. Later collections at Driftwood Canyon and the Quilchena site have also reported Amia scales.

== Paleoecology ==
Amia? hesperia was likely a piscivorous hunter, based on the large curved teeth of the jaws and vomers. Wilson (1982) noted the diet to be supported by close association of shed Amia scales and coprolites at multiple Okanagan highlands locations in British Columbia and Washington. Wilson (1996) proposed a near-shore weedy habitat at Republic, noting that such conditions are typically sought out by Amiid species.

Cohabitating with A.? hesperia in the Princeton area were the mooneye species Hiodon rosei, the sucker Amyzon brevipinne, the sandroller Libotonius blakeburnensis and the ancestral salmon Eosalmo driftwoodensis. At Republic, A.? hesperia lived with many of the same genera as at the other Okanagan highlands lakes, with species from four of the five other known genera present; Amyzon aggregatum, E. driftwoodensis, Hiodon woodruffi, and Libotonius pearsoni, in the respective basins. Lastly the ancestral salmon Eosalmo driftwoodensis is found in both lake basins and likely would have been a competing predator for A.? hesperia. The Horsefly shales preserve one additional fish species which coexisted with A.? hesperia, Priscacara aquilonia, the northern-most species in that extinct temperate bass genus.

== Age ==
The age estimates for the Allenby Formation have varied a number of times since the first explorations happened in the 1870s. Shaw (1952) dated the formation as Oligocene, an age followed by Arnold 1955. Half a decade later, the older age of 48 ± 2 million years old was first suggested, with a younger age being suggested at 46.2 ± 1.9 million years old in 2000 and an older date of 52.08 ± 0.12 million years ago obtained from Uranium–lead dating of zircons from Vermilion Bluffs shale in 2005.

== History and classification ==
The holotype specimen is a nearly complete, slightly disarticulated skeleton that is part of the University of Alberta paleoichthyology collections as specimen UAVP 14758. In addition to the part and counterpart type specimen, a group of additional fossils collected from within a "few centimeters" of the type are known, including scales, three branchial tooth plates, a right dentary and maxilla, two infraorbital bones, a right extrascapular, and a right opercle. All of the fossils described in the type paper were collected during field work in 1977. Wilson (1982) derived the specific epithet "hesperia" from the Latin hesperius meaning "western".

In a brief 1996 article Wilson noted the amiid scales found in the Klondike Mountain Formation around Republic, Washington, were likely from Amia? hesperia as the only amiid fish known from the Okanagan Highlands.

The phylogeny, fossil record, and species belonging to Amiidae were reviewed and redescribed by Grande & Bemis (1998) who placed Amia? hesperia within the subfamily Amiinae firmly as a distinct valid species. However, they noted that due to the preservation aspects of the holotype and the incomplete nature of the hind sections of the fish, placement within Amia was not certain when the extinct genus Cyclurus was recognized as a distinct taxon. Three character states were identified as distinguishing the two genera: tooth shape on the coronoids and vomers, shape of the parasphenoid tooth patch, and total number of preural centra. In Amia the coronoids and vomers sport pointed teeth for predation of fish, while in Cyclurus the teeth are styliform, with rounded flattened heads for crushing shellfish and arthropods. On the mouth roof in both genera, the parasphenoid hosts a tooth patch, which for Amia is long and narrow in outline, while for Cyclurus is short and trends towards heart shaped. Lastly, the number of preural centra, the bones connected to the last vertebrae in the spine and before the caudal fin differs between the two genera. In Cyclurus species there are between 57 and 73 preural centra, while in Amia species there are 75–82. In Amia? hesperia the disarticulated nature of the head obscures the majority of the parasphenoid tooth patch, with only a small portion of the posterior area visible. Additionally the total number of preural centra is unknown, and as such, the species was left as genus incertae sedis within the subfamily, awaiting recovery and description of more fossil material.

Of the species recognized by Grande and Bemis, Amia? hesperia was noted to be the most western and northern occurrence for subfamily Amiinae, though undescribed or poorly defined fossils have been identified from as far north as Ellesmere Island and Spitzbergen.

- Amiinae
  - Amia? hesperia
  - - Amia
      - Amia pattersoni
      - - Amia scutata
        - Amia clava
  - Cyclurus
    - Cyclurus oligocenicus
    - Cyclurus macrocephalus
    - Cyclurus ignotus

In contrast, Brownstein & Near (2024) found moderate support for A. hesperia as the basal most stem-member of Amia:

- Amiinae
  - - Amia
      - †Amia hesperia
      - - †Amia basiloides
        - - †Amia pattersoni
          - - †Amia scutata
            - - †Amia godai
              - - Amia calva
                - Amia ocellicauda
  - †Cyclurus

== Description ==
The head of Amia? hesperia is 160 mm (6.3 in), of which 90 mm (3.5 in) is occupied by the jaws, while the total estimated adult length for the holotype is 560 mm (22 in). In Amia? hesperia the hyomandibular bone has an opercular process that is placed further towards the bottom of bone than seen in other Amia species. The frontal bone is a similar in length to width ratio to that of A. pattersoni, but is notably smaller than in either A. calva or A. scutata. The dermosphenotic bone, which forms part of the orbital socket for the eyes, is larger than in any Amia species. The jaws have sharp conical teeth with a recurved profile.

The postcranial vertebra are narrow and broad, being approximately four times as tall as they are wide, with neural facets on the upper faces, and aortal facets on the lower faces, typical of other Amia species. The neural spines, haemal spines, ribs, hypurals, and pterygiophores all have slender rod-like appearances. The dorsal fin is shorter than seen in other species with only approximately 40 rays and starts approximately over the seventeenth trunk vertebra. In A. clava there are usually between 48 and 51, while species of Cyclurus range between 36 and 46. The anal fin is composed of approximately nine rays.

The scales preserved with the holotype are similar to scales from the other Okanagan highlands sites. They have a generally straight rear edge, a rounded apical margin, and an overall profile that is 2/3 as wide as long.
