= Alligator Creek =

Alligator Creek may refer to:

== United States ==
- Alligator Creek (East Bay River tributary), Florida
- Alligator Creek (Horse Creek tributary), Georgia
- Alligator Creek (Milligan Creek tributary), Georgia
- Alligator Creek (Suwannee River tributary), Georgia
- Alligator Creek (Little Ocmulgee River tributary), Georgia
- Alligator Creek (Montana), in the Missouri River watershed, Montana

== Australia ==
- Alligator Creek (Northern Territory), in the Wildman River watershed, Northern Territory
- Alligator Creek, Queensland (Cairns), a creek around which Malay Town was built in the early 20th century
- Alligator Creek, Queensland (Mackay), a coastal rural locality
- Alligator Creek, Queensland (Rockhampton), a tributary of the Fitzroy River (Queensland)
- Alligator Creek, Queensland (Townsville), a rural locality
- Alligator Creek (Western Australia), a watercourse in Western Australia

== See also ==
- Alligator River (disambiguation)
- Battle of the Tenaru, aka Battle of Alligator Creek, Guadalcanal, WWII
