= Alligator Juniper =

Alligator Juniper may refer to:

- Juniperus deppeana, a tree
- Alligator Juniper (magazine), undergraduate literature and arts magazine published annually by Prescott College
