= USS Alligator =

USS Alligator may refer to the following ships operated by the United States Navy:

- USS Alligator (1809) was a schooner built in 1809 as Gunboat No. 166 and named Alligator in 1812
- USS Alligator (1813) was a sloop purchased in 1813. The British captured her on 14 December 1814 during the Battle of Lake Borgne.
- USS Alligator (1820) was a schooner, launched in 1820, and scuttled in 1822
- USS Alligator (1862) was a non-commissioned submarine launched in 1862 and sank in April 1863.
