= Amia basiloides =

Amia basiloides Temporal range: Middle or Late Paleocene

Scientific classification
- Kingdom: Animalia
- Phylum: Chordata
- Class: Actinopterygii
- Clade: Halecomorphi
- Order: Amiiformes
- Family: Amiidae
- Genus: Amia
- Species: †A. basiloides

Binomial name
- †Amia basiloides Brownstein & Near, 2024

Extinct species of ray-finned fish

Amia basiloides is an extinct species of giant bowfin that inhabited western North America during the Middle or Late Paleocene, about 5-10 million years after the Cretaceous-Paleogene extinction event. The species name originates from the Ancient Greek βασιλεύς (basileus), meaning "king", referencing its immense size.

== Discovery ==
It is known from a holotype comprising nearly complete skull with a partial skeleton found in the Fort Union Formation in Montana, USA. This specimen was previously assigned to the species Amia uintaensis, a taxon now considered a nomen vanum. An isolated vertebra is also known from another Fort Union Formation locality, which appears to represent an individual 20 to 30 percent larger than the holotype individual.

== Description ==
At more than 2 metres (6.6 ft) in size, it is one of the largest known member of the Amiidae, and one of the largest holosteans known to have existed. The only bowfin relative known to rival it in size was the slightly smaller Late Cretaceous amiid Melvius. Its large size was likely related to the extinction of Melvius and other vidalamiines during the K-Pg extinction, opening up new ecological niches. It appears to have been an early-diverging member of the genus Amia, being more derived than A. hesperia, but more basal than all other members of the group, including extant bowfin species.

== Paleoecology ==
A. basiloides inhabited a subtropical freshwater swamp habitat in the interior of the North American continent. It shared this habitat with a very large Acipenser sturgeon, as well as the large choristoderes Champsosaurus and Kosmodraco. Numerous terrestrial fauna, including large mammals, also inhabited this habitat.
