= Alligator Lake (Osceola County, Florida) =

Lake in the state of Florida, United States

- Location within Florida Location within the United States
- Location: Osceola County, Florida
- Coordinates: 28°12′48″N 081°12′33″W
- Type: Natural Freshwater Lake
- Basin countries: United States
- Max. length: 4.04 miles (6.50 km)
- Max. width: 1.89 miles (3.04 km)
- Surface area: 3,551.57 acres (14.3727 km^{2})
- Max. depth: 28 feet (8.5 m)
- Surface elevation: 19 m (62 ft)
- Islands: Numerous Marshy Islets

Alligator Lake is a freshwater lake in Osceola County, Florida. In addition to alligators, it is home to largemouth bass, bluegill, bowfin, gar and redear sunfish. The lake is also known as the "Headwaters of the Everglades", despite its original name John Cordall Lake.
