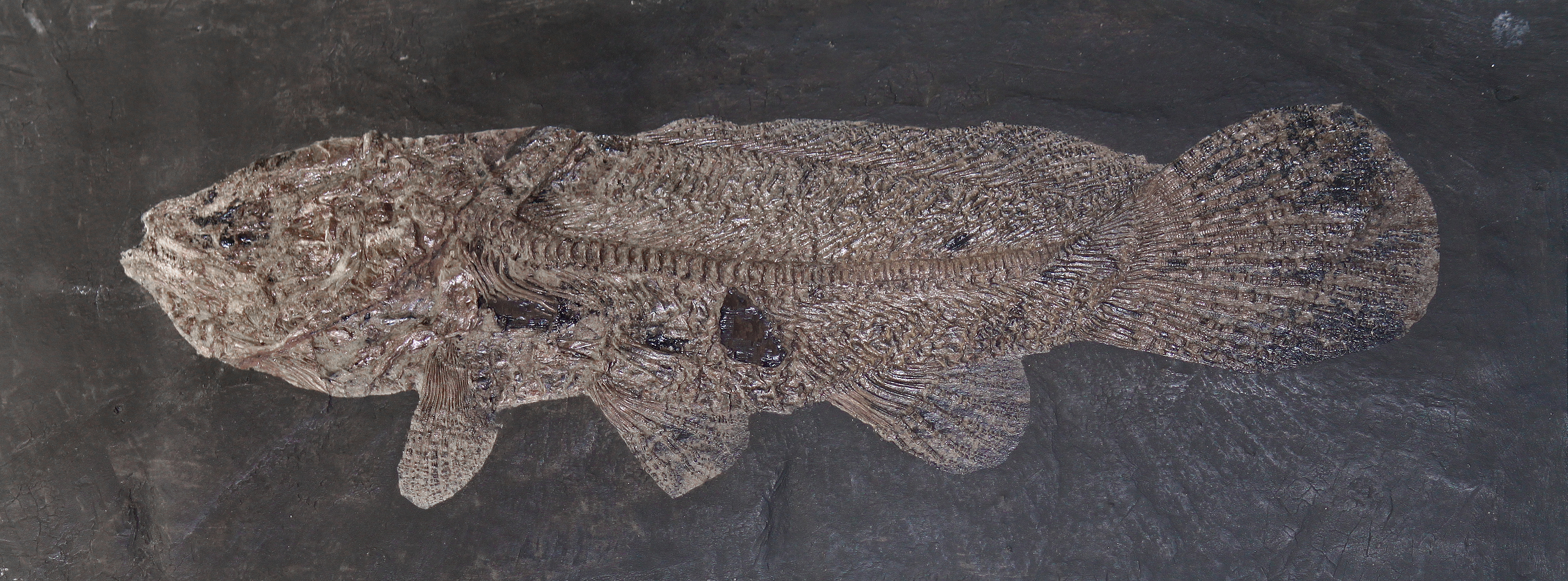
- Fossil of C. kehreri

Scientific classification
- Kingdom: Animalia
- Phylum: Chordata
- Class: Actinopterygii
- Clade: Halecomorphi
- Order: Amiiformes
- Family: Amiidae
- Subfamily: Amiinae
- Genus: †Cyclurus; Agassiz, 1844

Type species
- †Cyclurus valenciennesi Agassiz, 1844

Species
- See text

Synonyms
- †Kindleia Jordan, 1927; †Paramiatus Romer & Fryxell, 1928; †Stylomyleodon Russell, 1928

= Cyclurus =

Cyclurus Temporal range: Maastrichtian to Rupelian Possible Campanian occurrence

Extinct genus of ray-finned fishes

Cyclurus (Ancient Greek for "rounded tail") is an extinct genus of freshwater amiid ray-finned fish known from the Late Cretaceous to the Early Oligocene across much of the Northern Hemisphere. It is thought to be the closest relative of the extant bowfins in the genus Amia, although species of Cyclurus were significantly smaller in size compared to Amia.

== Evolution ==
Remains of Cyclurus are first known from western North America during the Maastrichtian stage of the Cretaceous with the species C. fragosus, with the genus having presumably diverged from Amia shortly before. Potential earlier remains are known from the Campanian. Alongside Amia, Cyclurus survived the Cretaceous-Paleogene extinction event in a refugium in western North America. Shortly afterwards, it saw a dramatic range expansion over the Paleogene, colonizing Europe and Asia by the Late Paleocene and becoming particularly successful and speciose in Europe. By the Late Eocene, it was one of the last two surviving halecomorph genera, alongside Amia. However, alongside most Amia species aside from those in eastern North America, it became extinct during the Oligocene.

== Taxonomy ==
The following species are known:

- †C. efremovi (Sytchevskaya, 1981) - late Paleocene of Mongolia (Naran Bulak Formation) (=Amia efremovi Sytchevskaya, 1981). Named for Ivan Yefremov.
- †C. fragosus (Jordan, 1927) - Late Cretaceous (Maastrichtian) of Alberta, Canada (Scollard Formation) and Montana, North Dakota, South Dakota and Wyoming, USA (Hell Creek Formation, Fox Hills Formation) (=Kindleia fragosa Jordan, 1927)
- †C. gurleyi (Romer & Fryxell, 1928) - early Eocene (Ypresian) of Wyoming, USA (Fossil Butte of Green River Formation) (=†Paramiatus gurleyi Romer & Fryxell, 1928)
- †C. ignotus (Blainville, 1818) - late Eocene (Priabonian) of France (Montmartre) (=†"Amia" ignota Blainville, 1818)
- †C. macrocephalus Reuss, 1844 - middle-late Eocene of the Czech Republic (Kutschlin)
- †C. oligocenicus Winkler, 1880 - early Oligocene (Rupelian) of Germany (Sieblos)
- †C. orientalis Chang, Wang & Wu, 2010 - early-mid Eocene of Hunan, China (Xiawanpu Formation)
- †C. kehreri (Andreae, 1893) - middle Eocene (Lutetian) of Germany (Messel Formation & Geiseltal Formation) (=Amia kehreri Andreae, 1893)
- †C. valenciennesi Agassiz, 1844 - late Paleocene of France (Puy de Dôme of Menat Formation). Named for Achille Valenciennes.

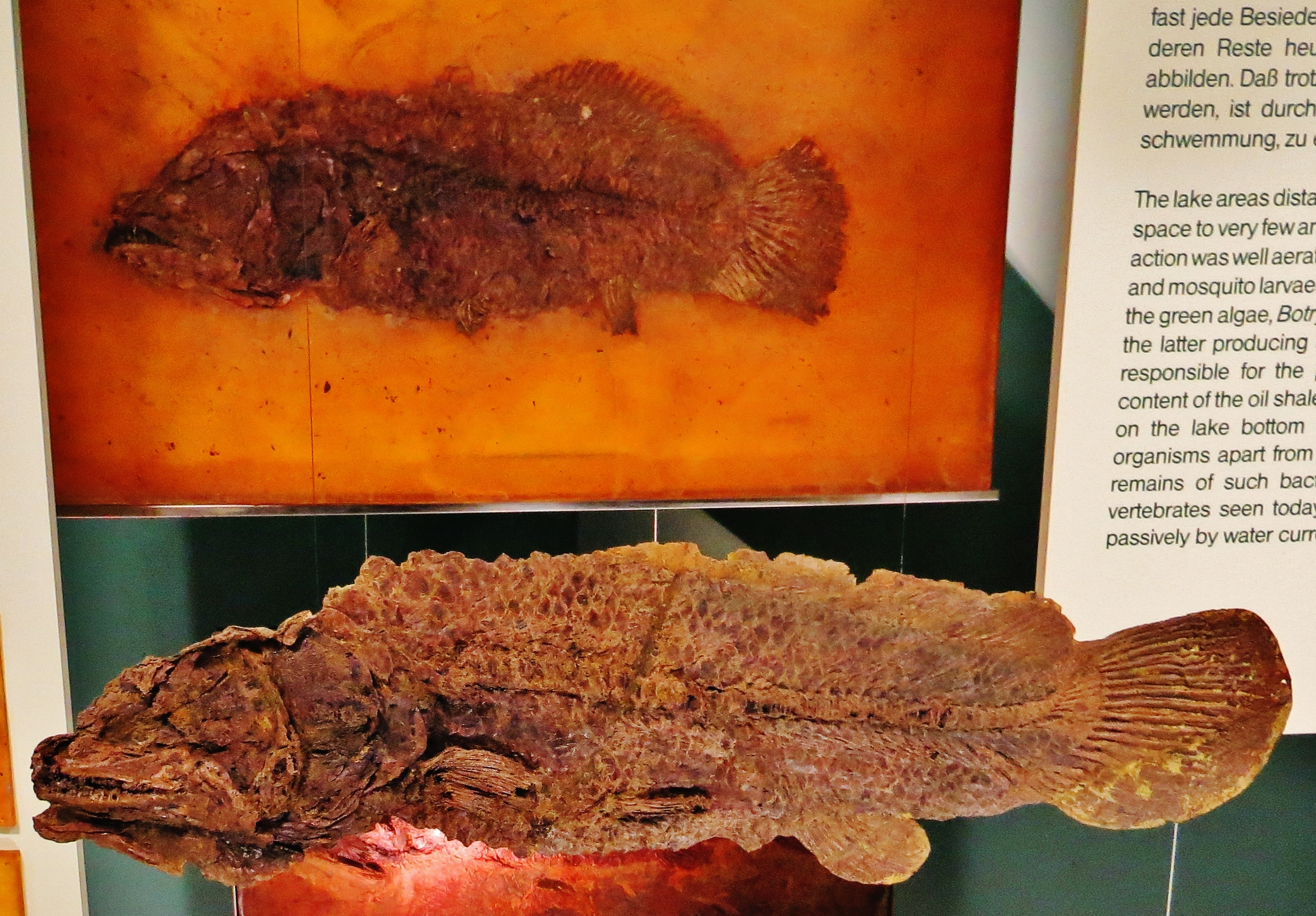
Fossils of C. kehreri are abundant in the Messel Formation

The species †C. "lacus" (Russell, 1928) (=†Stylomyleodon lacus Russell, 1928) from the middle Paleocene of Alberta, †C. "chinzhalensis" (Sytchevskaya, 1986) (=†Amia chinzhalensis Sytchevskaya, 1986) from the mid-late Eocene of Kazakhstan, and †C. "russelli" (Janot, 1966) (=†"Amia" russelli Janot, 1966) from the late Paleocene of France are considered nomina dubia due to insufficiently diagnostic remains. The Geiseltal specimens of C. kehreri differ morphologically from the Messel ones, and may represent a distinct species. Indeterminate Cyclurus remains are known from the middle Eocene of Jilin, China, the late Paleocene Ravenscrag Formation of Saskatchewan & the Maastrichtian Horseshoe Canyon Formation of Alberta, Canada, and possibly the Campanian-aged Aguja Formation of Texas, USA.

== Paleoecology ==
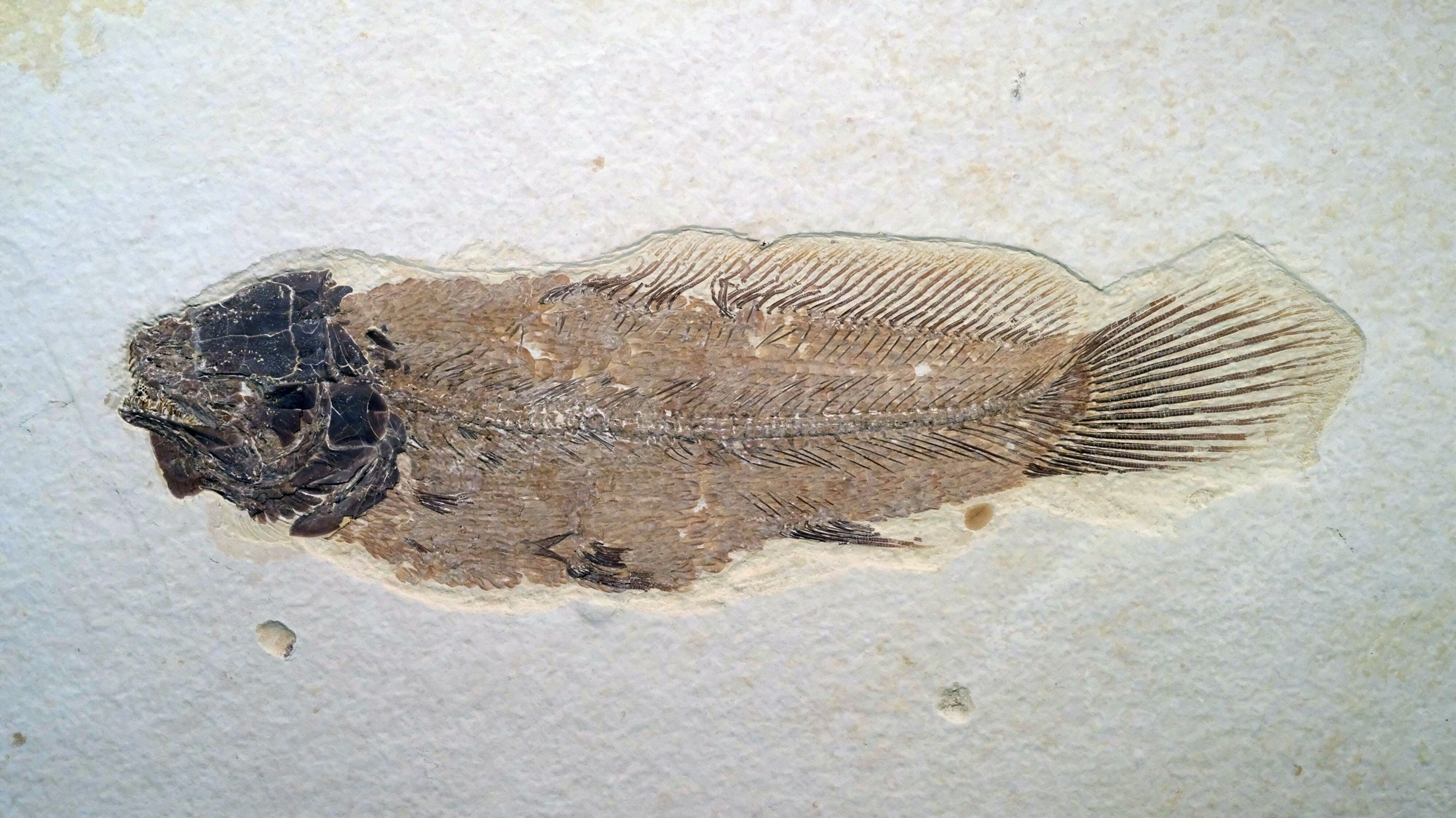
C. gurleyi is one of the rarest fish of the Green River Formation

C. kehreri is the most common fossil fish known from the Messel pit, and in fact the most abundant fossil amiid in the world, with thousands of specimens recovered. Fossils of C. kehreri are known representing different growth stages. Almost no specimens of C. kehreri are known with fish bones in their stomach (a specimen with percoid bones in its stomach is thought to have likely scavenged on them), suggesting that unlike other amiids, Cyclurus likely fed on small invertebrates instead of other fish. However, more recently, two C. kehreri specimens have been discovered with specimens of the bat Palaeochiropteryx caught in their mouths, suggesting that they either opportunistically attacked the dying bats or attempted scavenging on them, although these attempts were unsuccessful.

Contrasting with C. kehreri's abundance, C. gurleyi is one of the rarest fishes from the Green River Formation, with only 8 specimens known from the hundreds of thousands of fossil fishes excavated.
