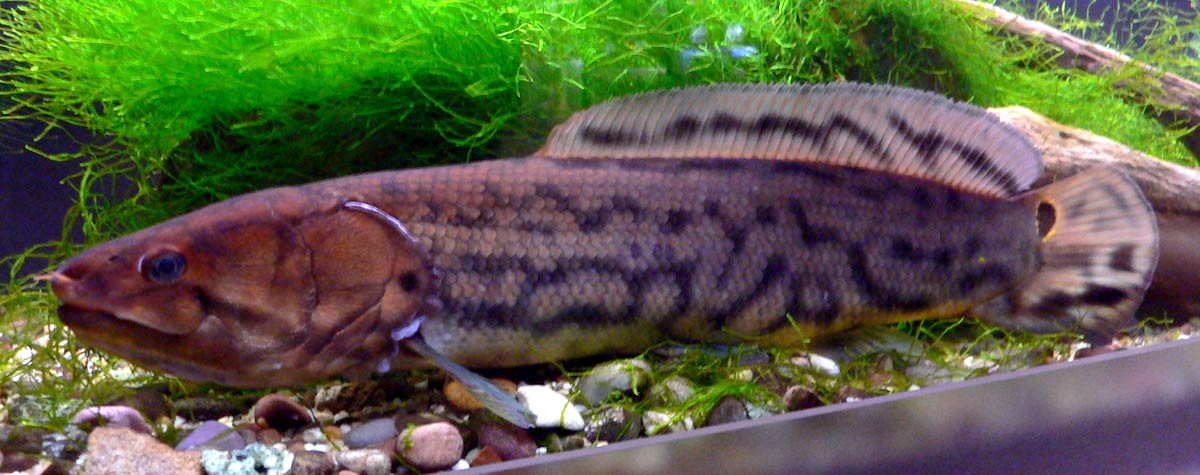
- Bowfin at the Steinhart Aquarium

Scientific classification
- Kingdom: Animalia
- Phylum: Chordata
- Class: Actinopterygii
- Clade: Halecomorphi
- Order: Amiiformes
- Family: Amiidae
- Genus: Amia; Linnaeus, 1766

Type species
- Amia calva Linnaeus, 1766

Species
- See text

Synonyms
- Amiatus Rafinesque 1815; Hypamia (Leidy 1873); Amia (Hypamia) Leidy 1873; Kindleia Jordan 1927; Protamia (Leidy 1873); Amia (Protamia) Leidy 1873; Stylomyleodon Russell 1928

= Amia (fish) =

Amia Temporal range: Middle Paleocene to present Possible Late Cretaceous record

Genus of ray-finned fishes

Amia, commonly called bowfin, is a genus of ray-finned fish related to gars in the infraclass Holostei. They are regarded as taxonomic relicts, being the sole surviving species of the order Amiiformes and clade Halecomorphi, which dates from the Triassic to the Eocene, persisting to the present. There are two living species in Amia, Amia calva and Amia ocellicauda, and a number of extinct species which have been described from the fossil record.

== Etymology ==
The genus name Amia derives from the Ancient Greek and Latin name for an unknown fish (most likely the Atlantic bonito) referred to by ancient and medieval authors including Pliny the Elder, Isidore of Seville, and Thomas of Cantimpré.

== Evolution and phylogeny ==
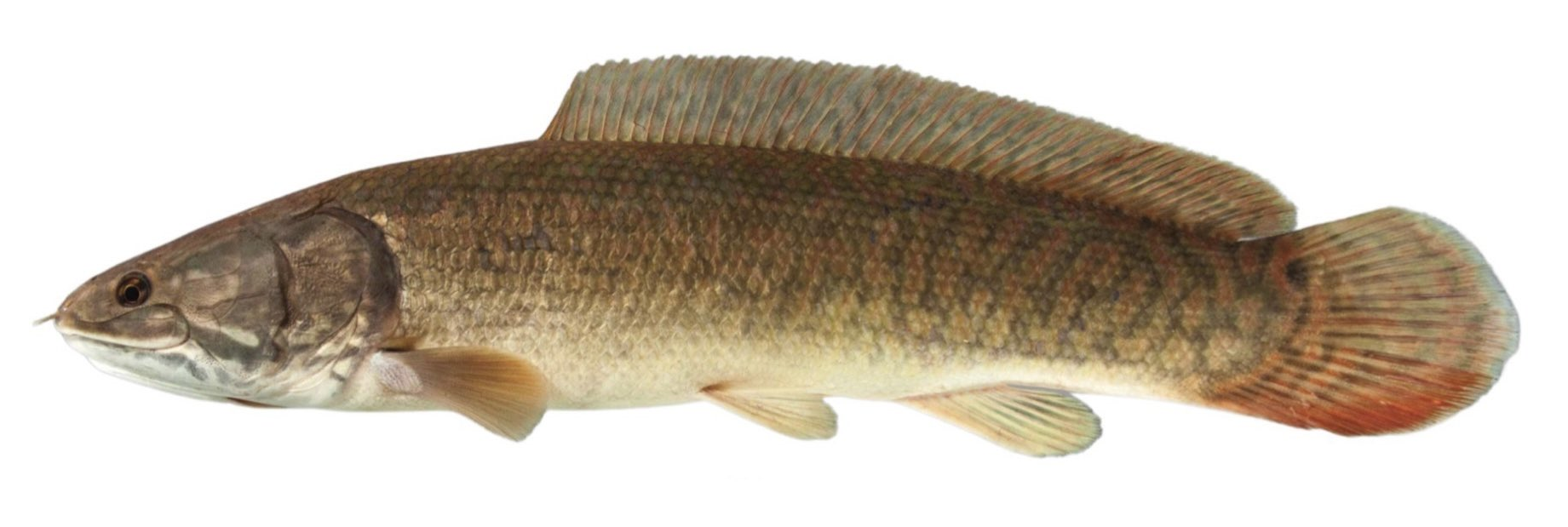
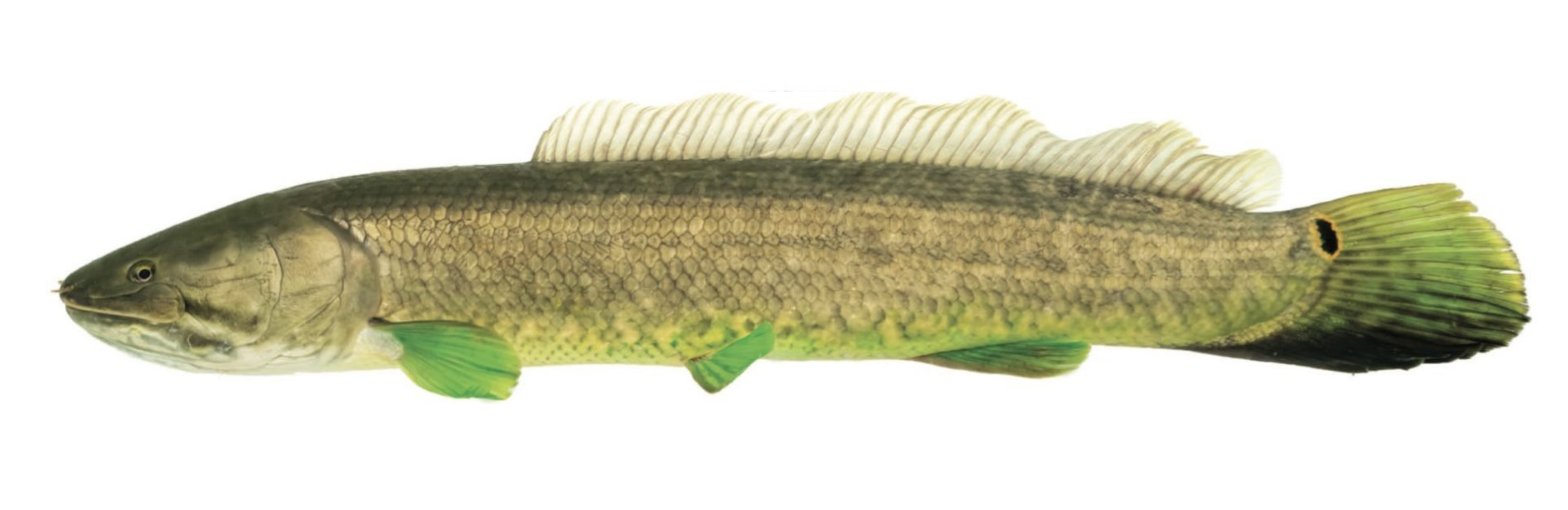
A. calva (left) and A. ocellicauda (right)

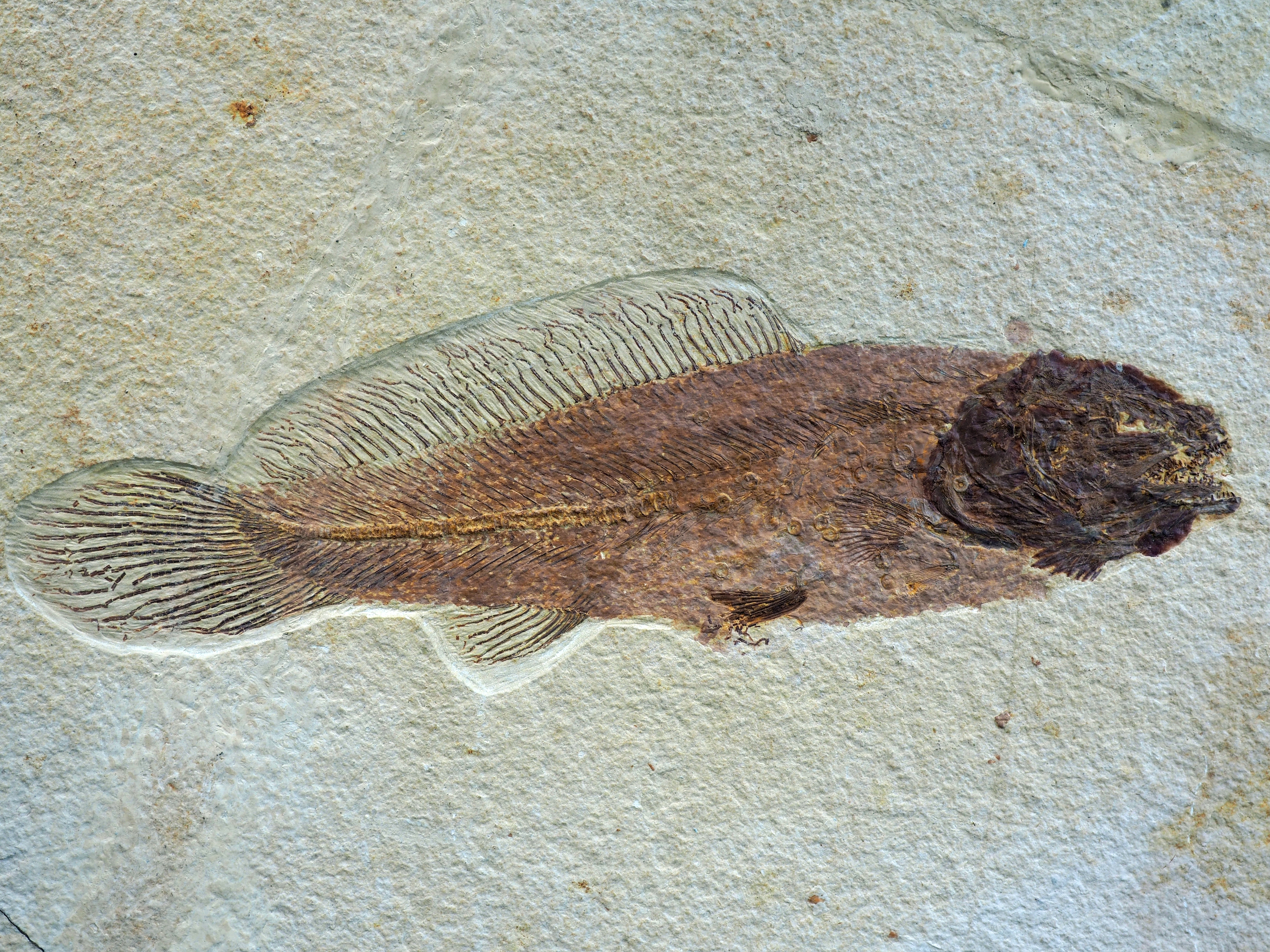
A. pattersoni, a fossil bowfin from the Eocene-aged Green River Formation

Amia is thought to have diverged from its sister genus, Cyclurus, during the Late Cretaceous. These two genera, their sister amiine Pseudoamiatus, and the marine vidalamiine Maliamia were the only amiids, and halecomorphs as a whole, to survive the Cretaceous-Paleogene extinction event.

Following the extinction event, Amia and Cyclurus survived in a refugium in western North America and experienced a rapid evolutionary radiation. The earliest fossil remains of Amia date to the Middle Paleocene, several million years after the K-Pg extinction. During this time period, some species of Amia evolved very large body sizes, most notably A. basiloides, which is one of the largest holosteans known to have existed. In contrast to the modern distribution of Amia, most of these fossils are from western North America.

Although Cyclurus dispersed to Europe and Asia shortly after the K-Pg extinction event, Amia largely remained in western North America until the very end of the Paleogene, when it dispersed west to Asia and east to eastern North America. Cyclurus went extinct during the Oligocene, leaving Amia as the only surviving amiid. At some point afterwards, Amia went extinct in western North America, and also went extinct in Asia during the Neogene, leaving only the eastern American populations, which have since undergone a small level of diversification.

=== Species ===
List of species.

- Amia calva Linnaeus 1766 (bowfin)
- Amia ocellicauda (eyespot bowfin)
- †Amia basiloides Brownstein & Near, 2024 (middle Paleocene of Montana, USA)
- †Amia godai Yabumoto & Grande, 2013 (Miocene of Japan)
- †Amia hesperia Wilson, 1982 (Eocene Okanagan Highlands)
- ?†Amia limosa Nessov, 1985 (Turonian of Uzbekistan)
- †Amia pattersoni Grande & Bemis, 1998 (late Paleocene of Alberta, Canada)
- †Amia scutata Cope 1875 (late Eocene of Colorado, USA)

The species 'Amia uintaensis' Leidy, 1873, which formerly contained several Amia specimens from western North America dating from the Late Cretaceous to the Eocene (including the holotype of A. basiloides), is considered a nomen vanum. Another large Paleocene amiid, Amia 'robusta' Smith & Radcliffe, 1911 from France, is known from non-diagnostic remains, and is thus considered a nomen dubium.

Possibly the oldest known species in the genus is Amia limosa from the Late Cretaceous-aged Bissekty Formation of Uzbekistan, for which it is the most abundant fossil fish. This species was considered a nomen dubium in a 1998 study, but a 2025 study retained it as a valid taxon, noting its distinguishing features from the related, concurrent Cyclurus fragosus of North America. It was also tentatively retained in Amia pending further research.

==== Phylogeny ====
Based on Brownstein & Near (2024):

- Amiinae
  - - Amia
      - †Amia hesperia
      - - †Amia basiloides
        - - †Amia pattersoni
          - - †Amia scutata
            - - †Amia godai
              - - Amia calva
                - Amia ocellicauda
  - †Cyclurus

=== Genome evolution ===
The bowfin genome contains an intact ParaHox gene cluster, similar to the bichir and to most other vertebrates. This is in contrast, however, with teleost fish, which have a fragmented ParaHox cluster, probably because of a whole genome duplication event in their lineage. The presence of an intact ParaHox gene cluster suggests that bowfin ancestors separated from other fish before the last common ancestor of all teleosts appeared. Bowfin are thus possibly a better model to study vertebrate genome organization than common teleost model organisms such as zebrafish.
