= Alligator Creek (Horse Creek tributary) =

Stream in Georgia, U.S.

Coordinates: 31°52′16″N 82°55′31″W

Alligator Creek is a stream in the U.S. state of Georgia. It is a tributary to Horse Creek.

Alligator Creek was named after the American alligator.
