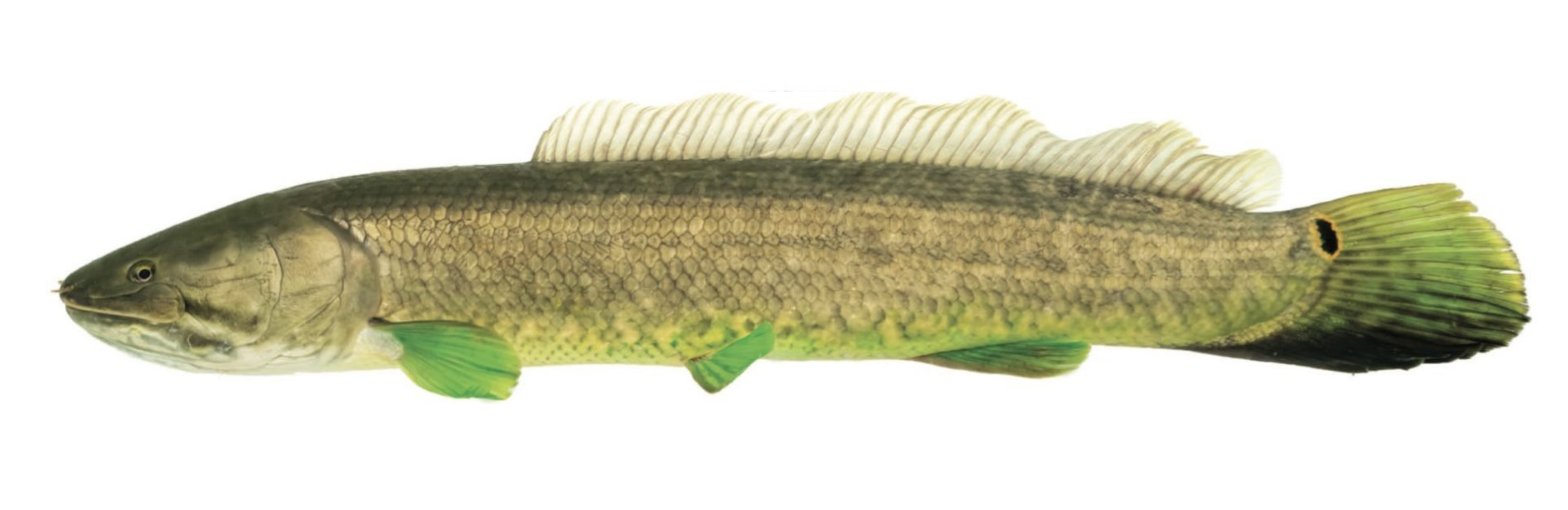
- From the Tennessee River, Alabama

Scientific classification
- Kingdom: Animalia
- Phylum: Chordata
- Class: Actinopterygii
- Clade: Halecomorphi
- Order: Amiiformes
- Family: Amiidae
- Genus: Amia
- Species: A. ocellicauda

Binomial name
- Amia ocellicauda (Richardson, 1836)

= Amia ocellicauda =

Species of ray-finned fish

Amia ocellicauda, the eyespot bowfin or emerald bowfin, is a species of bowfin native to North America. Originally described by John Richardson from Lake Huron in 1836, it was synonymized with Amia calva until genetic work in 2022 revealed them to be separate species.

It differs from Amia calva by having fewer dentary teeth (only 15 compared to 16 or 17 of A. calva) and its interopercle membrane bone being smaller. It also has a more pronounced eyespot, has a longer body, has a less red hue, and males have green coloration during the breeding season. The two species split approximately 1 to 2.5 million years ago during the mid-Pliocene. It is hypothesized that there are still several more undescribed species of Amia to be described. The vernacular name eyetail bowfin, was proposed by Brownstein et al.

== Distribution and habitat ==
This species ranges from around the Great Lakes and Ontario to the Gulf Coast wetlands of Louisiana and Texas. It is absent from the southeast, where its sister species Amia calva is found instead. Since the emerald bowfin was only officially recognized recently, it is currently hard to completely differentiate the range of the two species.

They can be found in freshwater lakes and rivers, and prefer warm, weedy lakes or slow flowing rivers with soft bottoms. They can tolerate water temperatures up to 35 °C (95 °F).

== Description ==
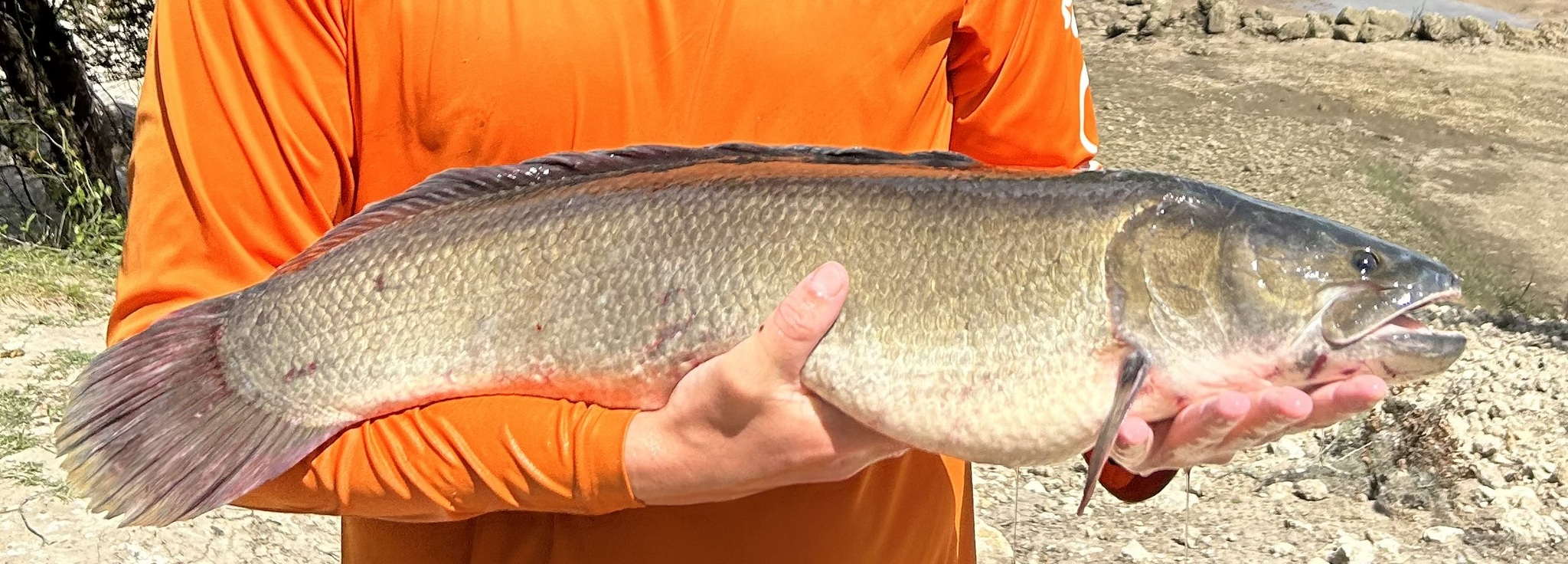
Large specimen, in Texas

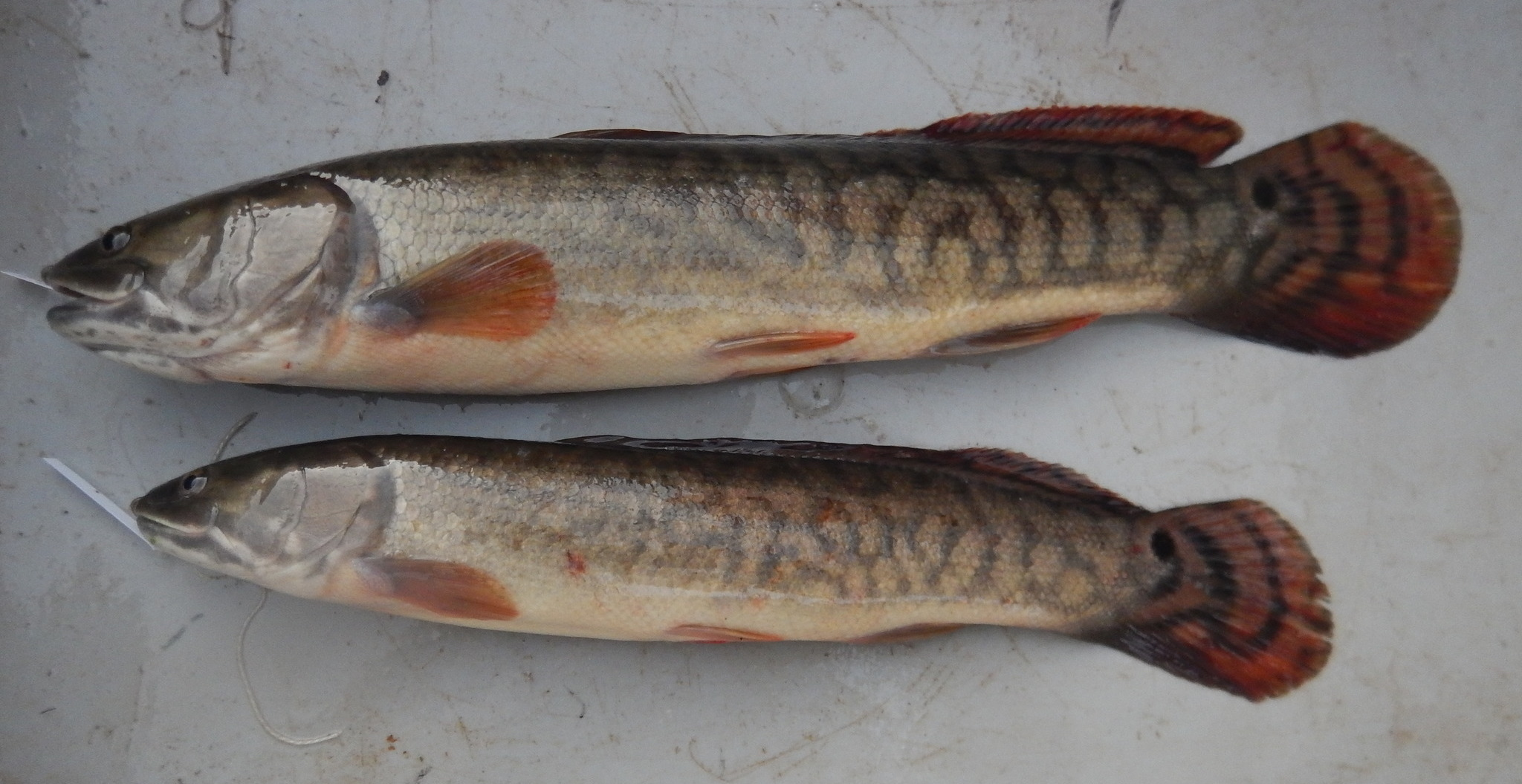
In Texas

Like the ruddy bowfin (Amia calva), the emerald bowfin has an elongated, cylindrical body. It has a long, single soft dorsal fin often containing more than 45 rays. The head is flattened, with a strong jaw and sharp teeth. The top of the body is an olive green and can have darker bars going down the body, and the belly is a more cream-white.

Like the name suggests, it has a distinct "eyespot," a black dot surrounded by yellow, near the start of its rounded caudal fin. Females may lack the yellow around the spot. While A. calva also has an eyespot, it is often more distinct on A. ocellicauda.

They can grow to 92.7 cm (36.5 in) and 9.3 kg (21 lb), slightly smaller than the ruddy bowfin. Males live on average 6 years, while females live 10–12 years. Wild specimens from Minnesota have been recorded living as long as 33 years in the wild.

== Reproduction ==
The emerald bowfin is notable for developing a vivid green pattern on its pectoral, pelvic, and anal fins during their May–June spawning season. The belly area will also develop a more greenish hue.

Emerald bowfins mature between two and three years of age. Males will create a spawning bed in a patch of vegetation, and will wait to court a female. After mating, the male will guard the nest. Females can lay up to 64,000 eggs, and may mate with multiple males.

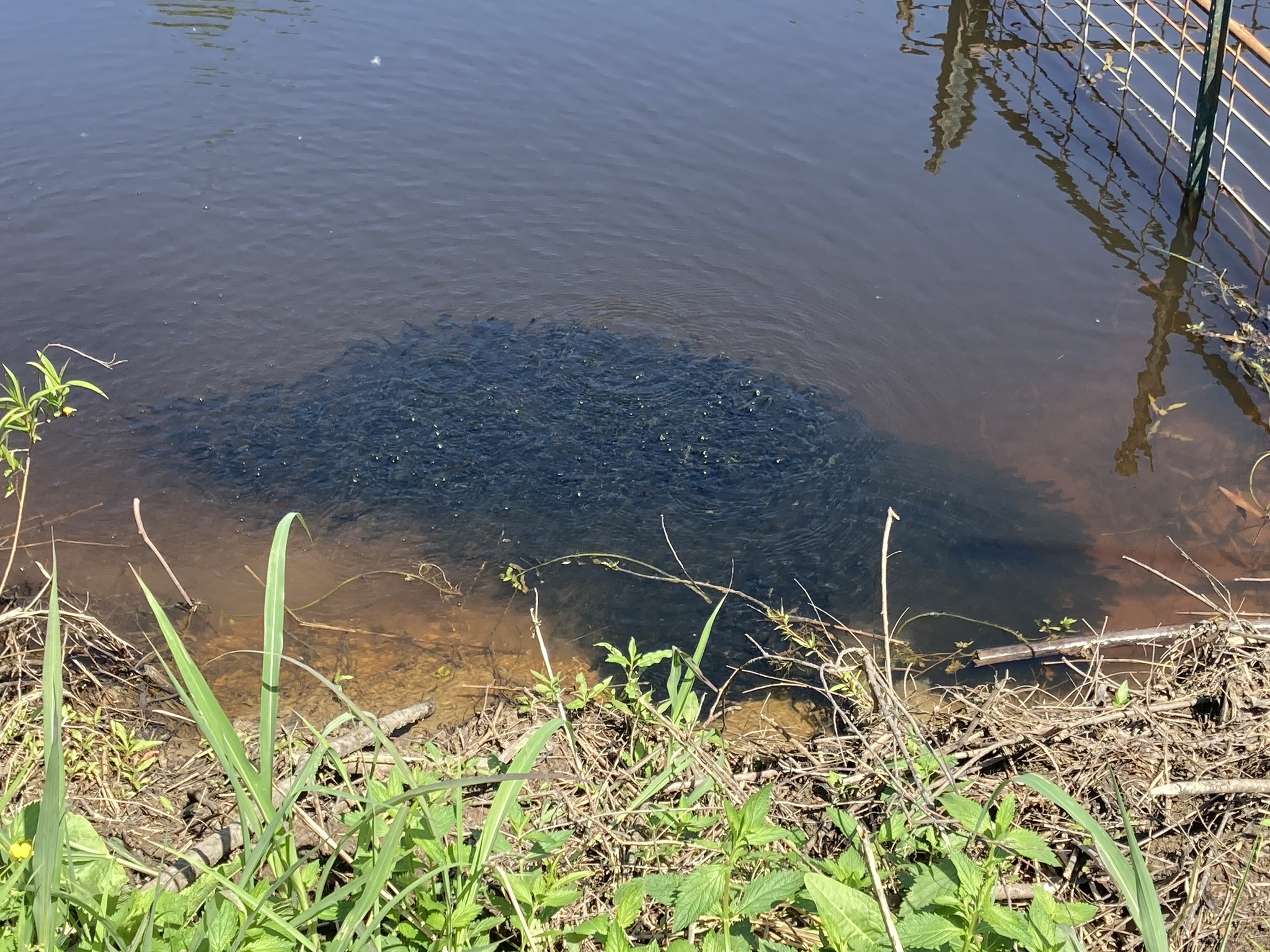
Juvenile school, in Louisiana

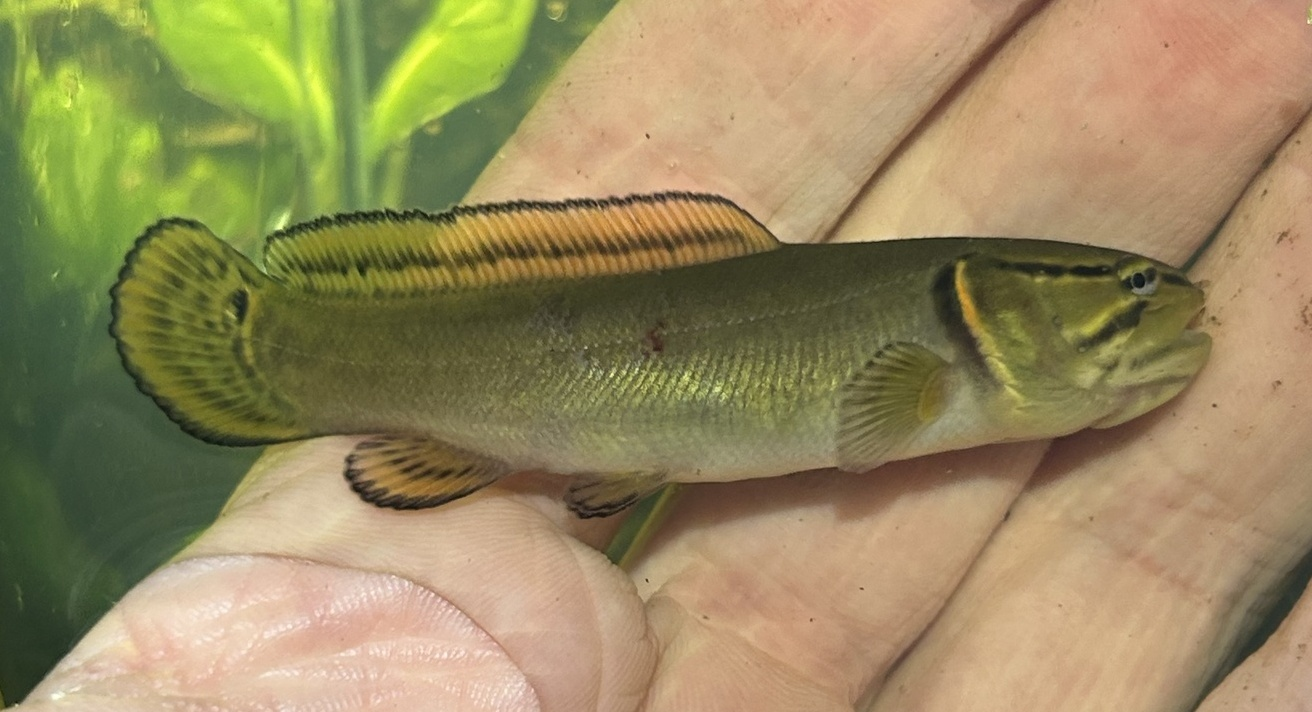
Young juvenile, in Tennessee

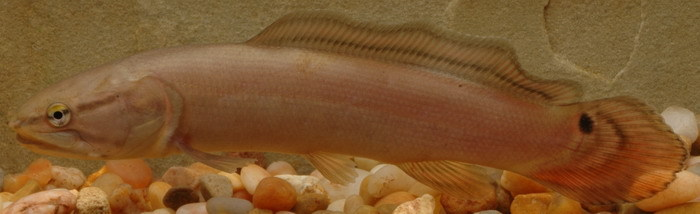
Older juvenile, in Texas

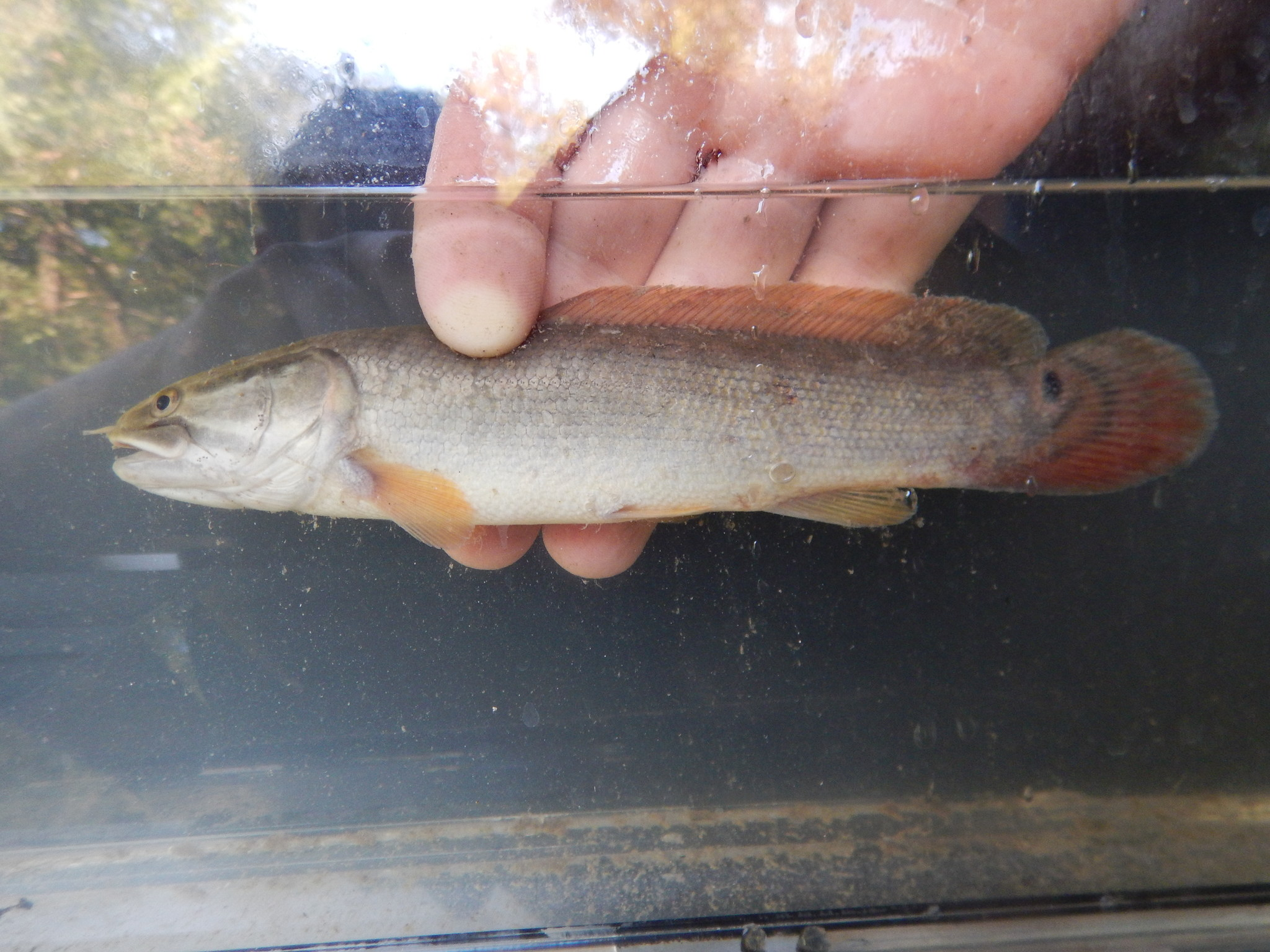
Older juvenile, in Texas

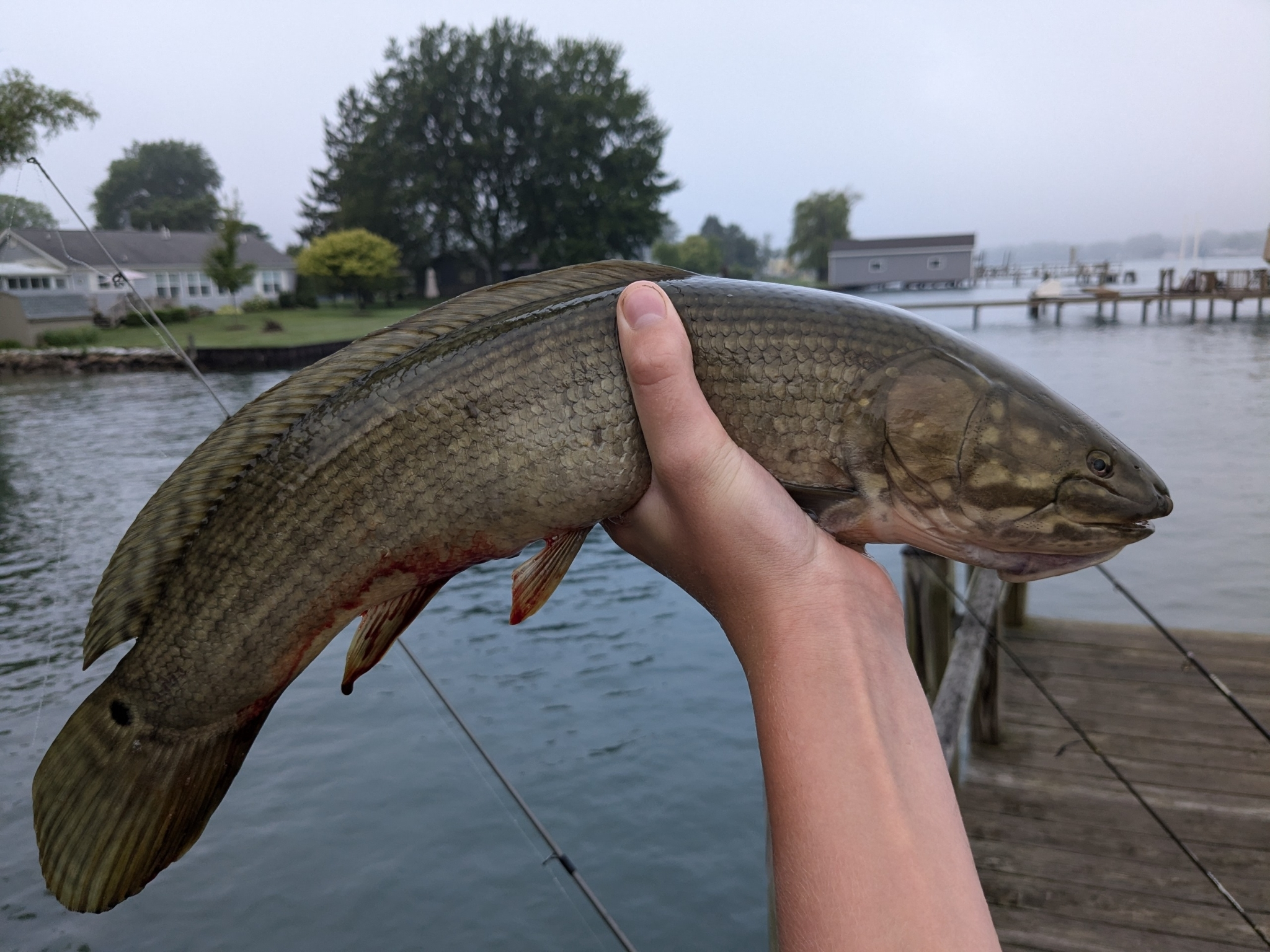
Adult, in Michigan

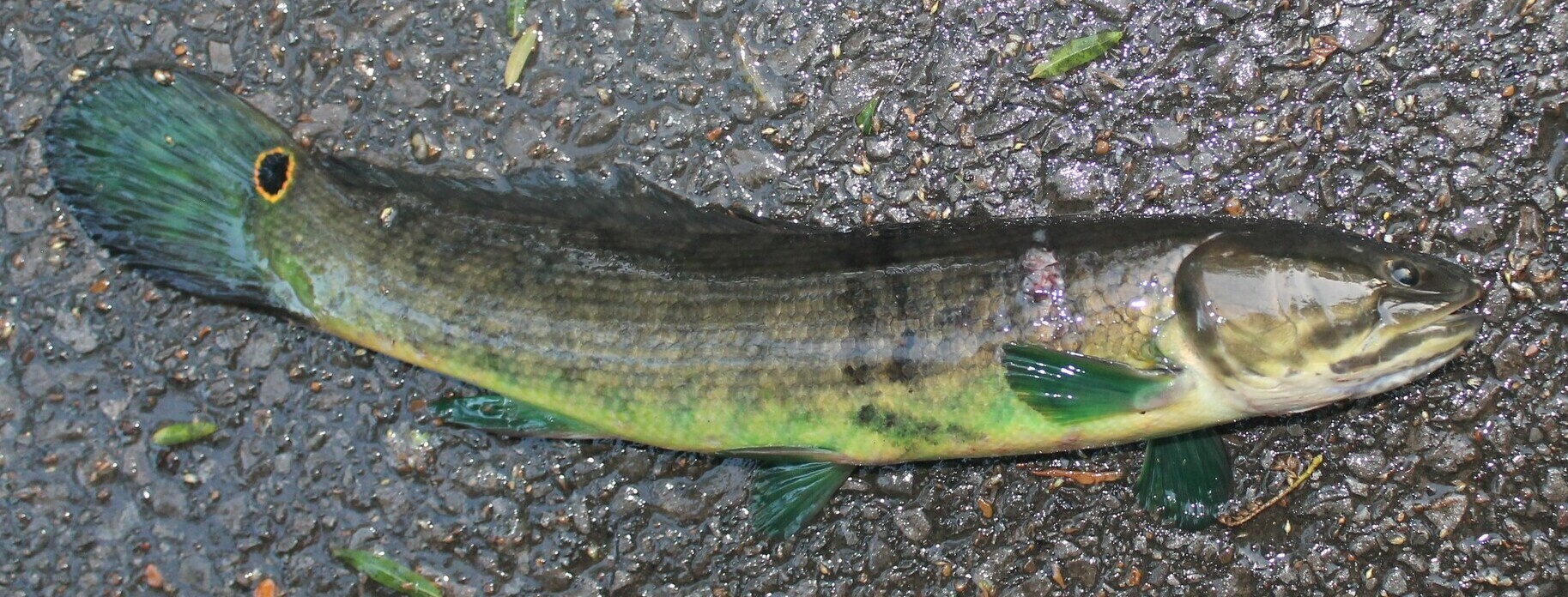
Male in spawning colours, in Tennessee

== Diet and feeding ==
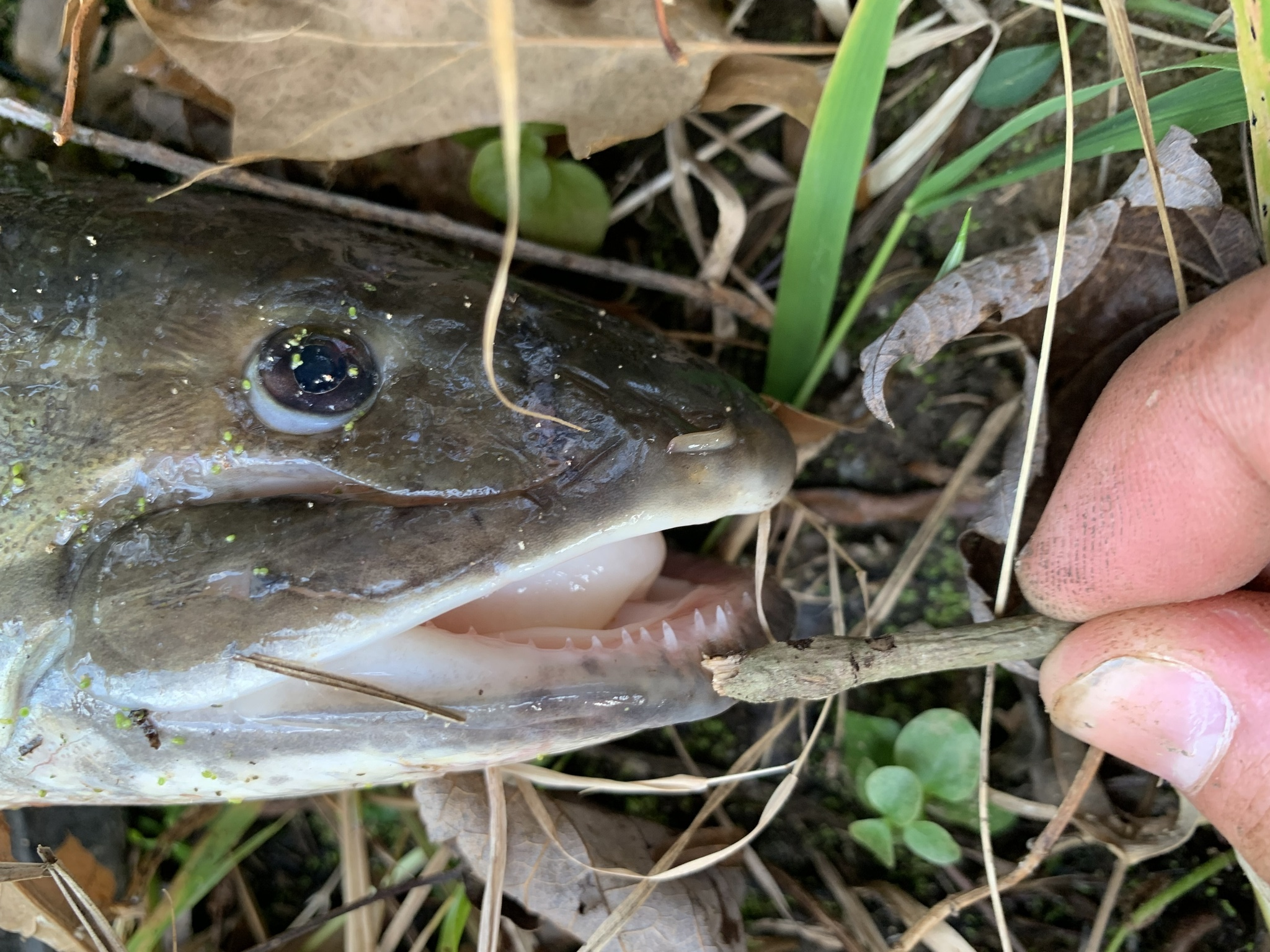
Showing teeth, in Indiana

Young bowfin eat smaller prey such as microcrustaceans and aquatic insects. Adults eat larger prey, such as gizzard shad, sunfishes, bullheads, golden shiners, as well as non-fish like crayfish, larger insects and worms, and frogs.

During the day, emerald bowfin will hide in deeper waters, and will come into more shallow waters to feed during the night.
