= Alligator Creek (Suwannee River tributary) =

Stream in Georgia, U.S.

Coordinates: 30°45′26″N 82°29′25″W

Alligator Creek is a stream in the U.S. state of Georgia. It is a tributary to the Suwannee River.

Alligator Creek was named after the American alligator.
