= Alligator Alley (disambiguation) =

Alligator Alley may refer to:

- Alligator Alley, a designation for Interstate 75 in Florida between Naples and Fort Lauderdale
- Alligator Alley, a grade 2/3 band piece by Michael Daugherty
- Alligator Alley, a novel by K. W. Jeter (as "Dr. Adder") and Tim MacNamara (as "Mink Mole")
- "Alligator Alley" a song by the musician Keller Williams
- "Alligator Alley" or "Gator Alley", nickname of Florida Gymnasium on the University of Florida campus
