= Alligator Creek (Milligan Creek tributary) =

Stream in Georgia, U.S.

Coordinates: 32°00′12″N 82°27′03″W

Alligator Creek is a stream in the U.S. state of Georgia. It is a tributary to Milligan Creek.

Alligator Creek was named after the American alligator.
