= HMS Alligator =

Three ships of the Royal Navy have borne the name HMS Alligator, after the marine reptile, the alligator. A fourth ship was planned but later cancelled:

- HMS Alligator (1780) was a 14-gun sloop launched in 1780. In April 1782 she was at Accra, in company with Leander when they destroyed a French storeship and captured several forts. On her way back to Britain on 26 June she encountered a French frigate off the Scilly Isles and a chase ensued and eventually a two-hour action in which she had three men killed and her captain and eleven others wounded. Eventually she struck to Fée. Between 1782 and 1783 she was known as Alligator No.2. In October 1783 she became the packet ship Courrier de New-York, operating out of Lorient, and took up the Lorient-New York route in December. She was transferred to the Régie de Paquebots in May 1787 and used on the Le Havre-New York and Le Havre-Antilles routes. As a packet ship she had a crew of 47 men and was armed with sixteen 6-pounder guns. She was put up for sale in December 1788 and in January 1789 she was sold at Havre to Sr. Ruellen. In 1794 she was renamed Alligator.
- HMS Alligator (1787) was a 28-gun sixth rate launched in 1787 and sold in 1814.
- HMS Alligator (1821) was a 28-gun sixth rate launched in 1821, hulked in December 1846 as a hospital and storeship at Hong Kong until struck there in October 1865.
- HMS Alligator was to have been a wooden screw corvette. She was laid down in 1860, but cancelled in 1863.
