= Alligator Bay =

Swamp in Georgia, USA

Coordinates: 32.0188152°N 81.5987241°W

Alligator Bay is a swamp in the U.S. state of Georgia.

Alligator Bay was named after the American alligator.
