= USS Alligator (1809) =

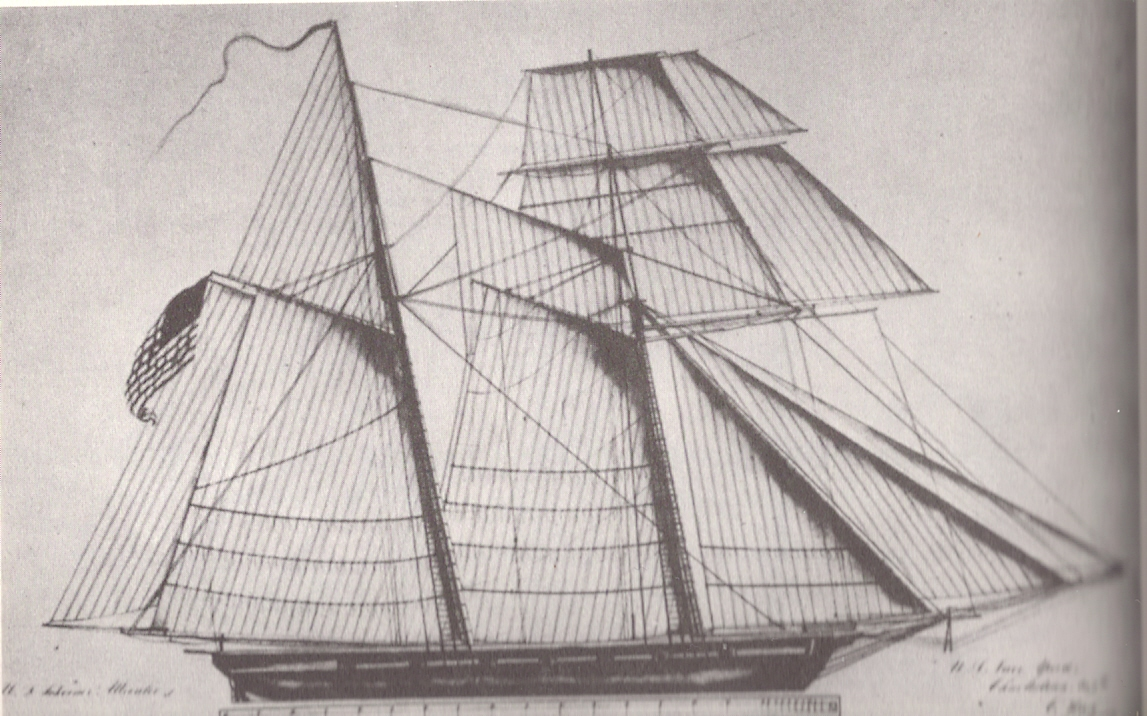
- Sail plan of USS Alligator

History

United States
- Name: USS Alligator
- Builder: Ames Perry, Smithville, North Carolina
- Laid down: 1809
- Commissioned: mid-1809
- Fate: Sold, 12 June 1815

General characteristics
- Type: Schooner
- Tons burthen: 80 (bm)
- Length: 60 ft (18 m)
- Beam: 16 ft (4.9 m)
- Depth: 5 ft 11 in (1.80 m)
- Propulsion: Sail
- Complement: 40 officers and enlisted
- Armament: 4 guns

The first USS Alligator was a schooner in the United States Navy, built in 1809 as Gunboat No. 166 and renamed Alligator during the War of 1812. Upon completion she was placed in ordinary at Wilmington, North Carolina. She was commissioned sometime in mid-1809, under Master Commandant Joseph Tarbell.

Built and commissioned as a part of the Democratic-Republican Party's defensive "Gunboat Navy", Gunboat No. 166 served on the coast of the Carolinas, protecting coastal commerce. She was still operating on that station when the War of 1812 opened. That same year, she received the name Alligator.

On 29 January 1814, she was anchored in the mouth of the Stono River, South Carolina, when two British ships – a frigate and a brig – sailed close inshore. It was quite apparent from their movements that they would send a boat expedition in to cut her out during the night. Alligator made her preparations to ward off the expected attack. At about 1915 hour that evening, lookouts spied seven boats approaching with muffled oars. Alligator hailed the newcomers whereupon they raised a cheer and opened with their boat carronades and small arms. Alligator cut her cable, made sail, and opened a withering fire on the intruders. The return fire stopped the attackers cold, but, in the darkness, Alligator ran aground. Her assailants had lost heart and rowed back downstream to their ships, apparently having suffered heavy casualties. Alligator lost two men killed and two wounded.

She was soon refloated and returned to service. In July 1814, however, she sank in Port Royal Sound during a heavy storm. Twenty-one of her crew drowned.

Refloated once again, Alligator was sold on 12 June 1815.

== Sources ==
- Silverstone, Paul H. (2001) The Sailing Navy, 1775-1854. (Annapolis, MD: Naval Institute Press) ISBN 978-1-55750-893-5
- Tucker, Tucker (1993) The Jeffersonian Gunboat Navy.
