= Alligator River =

Alligator River may refer to:

- Alligator Rivers, three rivers, the East, West, and South Alligator Rivers, at the Top End region of Australia
- Alligator River (North Carolina), US
- Alligator River National Wildlife Refuge in North Carolina, US

== See also ==
- Alligator Creek (disambiguation)
- The Great Alligator River, a 1979 Italian film
