= Alligator Juniper (magazine) =

- Discipline: Literary magazine
- Language: English

Publication details
- History: 1995 to present
- Publisher: Prescott College (USA)
- Frequency: Annually

Standard abbreviations
- ISO 4: Alligator Juniper

Indexing
- ISSN: 1547-187X

Alligator Juniper is a national literary magazine published annually by Prescott College. The journal was founded by Melanie Bishop in 1995. Publication is funded by the Arizona Commission on the Arts and the National Endowment for the Arts.

In 2001, 2004, and 2009, the magazine won the content award of the AWP Director's Prize for undergraduate magazines.

Stories and poems that have appeared in Alligator Juniper have received the Pushcart Prize and inclusion in various anthologies. The journal regularly receives positive reviews from Newpages.

== Notable contributors ==
- Ellen Winter
- Alix Ohlin
- Laura Didyk
- Connie Voisine
- Michaela Carter
- Allan Peterson
- Natalie Singer
- Blake Butler
- Rebekah Banks Ewing
- Catherine Dryden
- Leonard Michaels
- Kevin Brown
- Elizabeth Volpe
- Jessica Roth
- Eliot Treichel
- Tony Hoagland
- Elton Glaser
- Anna Green
- Jacob Appel
- Sally Ball
- Marilyn Szabo
- Matt Mendez
- Justin St. Germain
- Robert Schirmer
- Kathleen Kirk
- Laurie Ann Doyle
- David Ebershoff

== Awards and honors ==
- Two of the Prescott College student prizewinners appearing in the 2009 issue were selected for an anthology of best undergraduate work published in the country in 2009: Jillian Fragale's “Splitting in Half” (creative nonfiction) and K. Angeline Pittenger's “Untitled” (photography) appeared in plain china: Best Undergraduate Writing 2009, published online during spring term 2010 by Bennington College. Alligator Juniper was one of more than 60 journals in the reading mix, along with publications from Brown, Carnegie Mellon, the University of Chicago, Harvard, Princeton, Reed, Rice, Stanford, and Tulane.
- Justin St. Germain's story “The Last Day of the Boom” from our 2008 issue was included in Best of the West: New Stories from the Wide Side of the Missouri (University of Texas Press, 2009).
- Kevin Brown's story “One Life” from our 2007 issue was included in the teaching anthology Voices published by The Institute.
- Elton Glaser's poem “Drinking Alone on a Spring Day,” published in Alligator Juniper 2007, was featured on Verse Daily.
- Anna Green's story “Food Stamps,” published in Alligator Juniper 2006, was reprinted in the anthology New Stories from the Southwest.
- Sally Ball's poem “’Tis Often Thus with Spirits” and Claire Whitenack's poem “At the Fish Hatchery,” both published in our 2006 issue, were featured on Verse Daily.
- Marilyn Szabo of Phoenix, AZ has been published several times. She won the 2010 National Photography award with her "Covenant Transport I" image.
