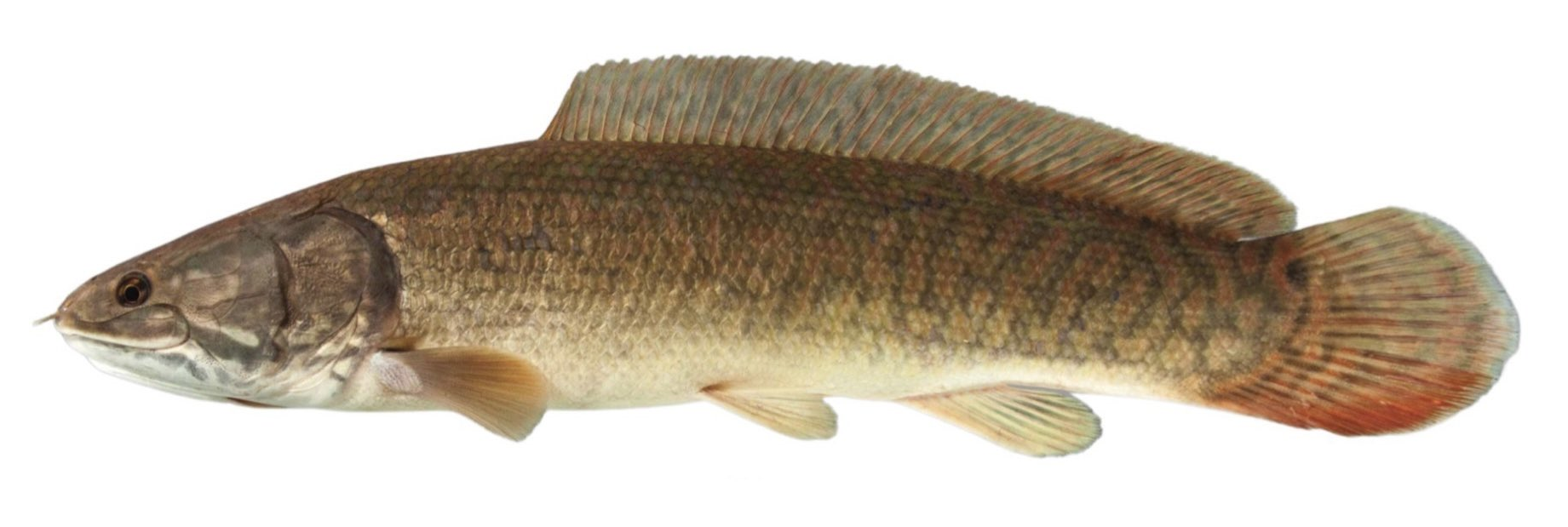
- From the Suwanee River, Florida

Conservation status
- Least Concern (IUCN 3.1)

- Unranked (NatureServe)

Scientific classification
- Kingdom: Animalia
- Phylum: Chordata
- Class: Actinopterygii
- Clade: Halecomorphi
- Order: Amiiformes
- Family: Amiidae
- Genus: Amia
- Species: A. calva

Binomial name
- Amia calva Linnaeus, 1766
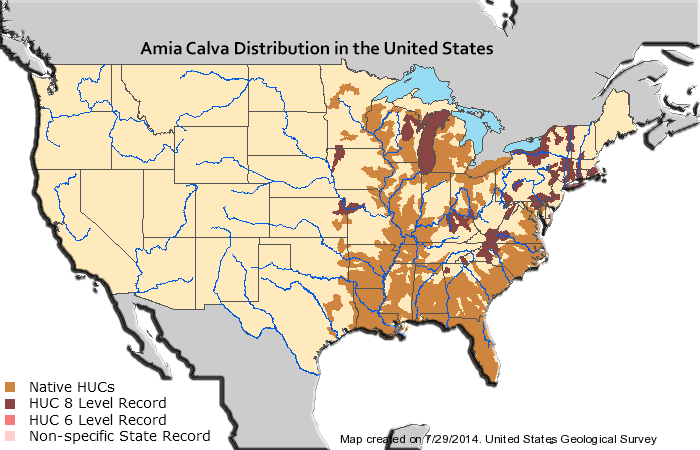
- Combined range of both extant Amia species

Synonyms
- Species: Amia occidentalis DeKay 1842; Amia marmorata Valenciennes 1847; Amia ornata Valenciennes 1847; Amia viridis Valenciennes 1847; Amia cinerea Valenciennes 1847; Amia reticulata Valenciennes 1847; Amia canina Valenciennes 1847; Amia lintiginosa Valenciennes 1847; Amia subcoerulea Valenciennes 1847; Amia thompsonii Duméril 1870; Amia piquotii Duméril 1870; Amiatus calvus (Linnaeus 1766)

= Bowfin =

Species of ray-finned fish

The ruddy bowfin (Amia calva) is a ray-finned fish native to North America. Common names include mudfish, mud pike, dogfish, grindle, grinnel, swamp trout, and choupique. It is regarded as a relict, being one of only two surviving species of the Halecomorphi, a group of fish that first appeared during the Early Triassic, around 250 million years ago. The bowfin is often considered a "living fossil" because it has retained some morphological characteristics of its early ancestors. It is one of two species in the genus Amia, along with Amia ocellicauda, the eyespot bowfin. The closest living relatives of bowfins are gars, with the two groups being united in the clade Holostei.

Bowfins are demersal, freshwater piscivores, commonly found throughout much of the Eastern United States, and southern Ontario and Quebec. Fossil deposits indicate the Amiiformes were once widespread in both freshwater and marine environments across North and South America, Europe, Asia, and Africa. Now, their range is limited to much of the Eastern United States and adjacent southern Canada, including the drainage basins of the Mississippi River, Great Lakes, and various rivers exiting in the Eastern Seaboard or Gulf of Mexico. Their preferred habitat includes vegetated sloughs, lowland rivers and lakes, swamps, and backwater areas; they are also occasionally found in brackish water. They are stalking, ambush predators known to move into the shallows at night to prey on fish and aquatic invertebrates such as crawfish, mollusks, and aquatic insects.

Like gars, bowfin are bimodal breathers—they have the capacity to breathe both water and air. Their gills exchange gases in the water, allowing them to breathe, but they also have a gas bladder that serves to maintain buoyancy and also allows them to breathe air by means of a small pneumatic duct connected from the foregut to the gas bladder. They can break the surface to gulp air, which allows them to survive conditions of aquatic hypoxia that would be lethal to most other species. The bowfin is long-lived, with ages up to 33 years reported.

== Description ==
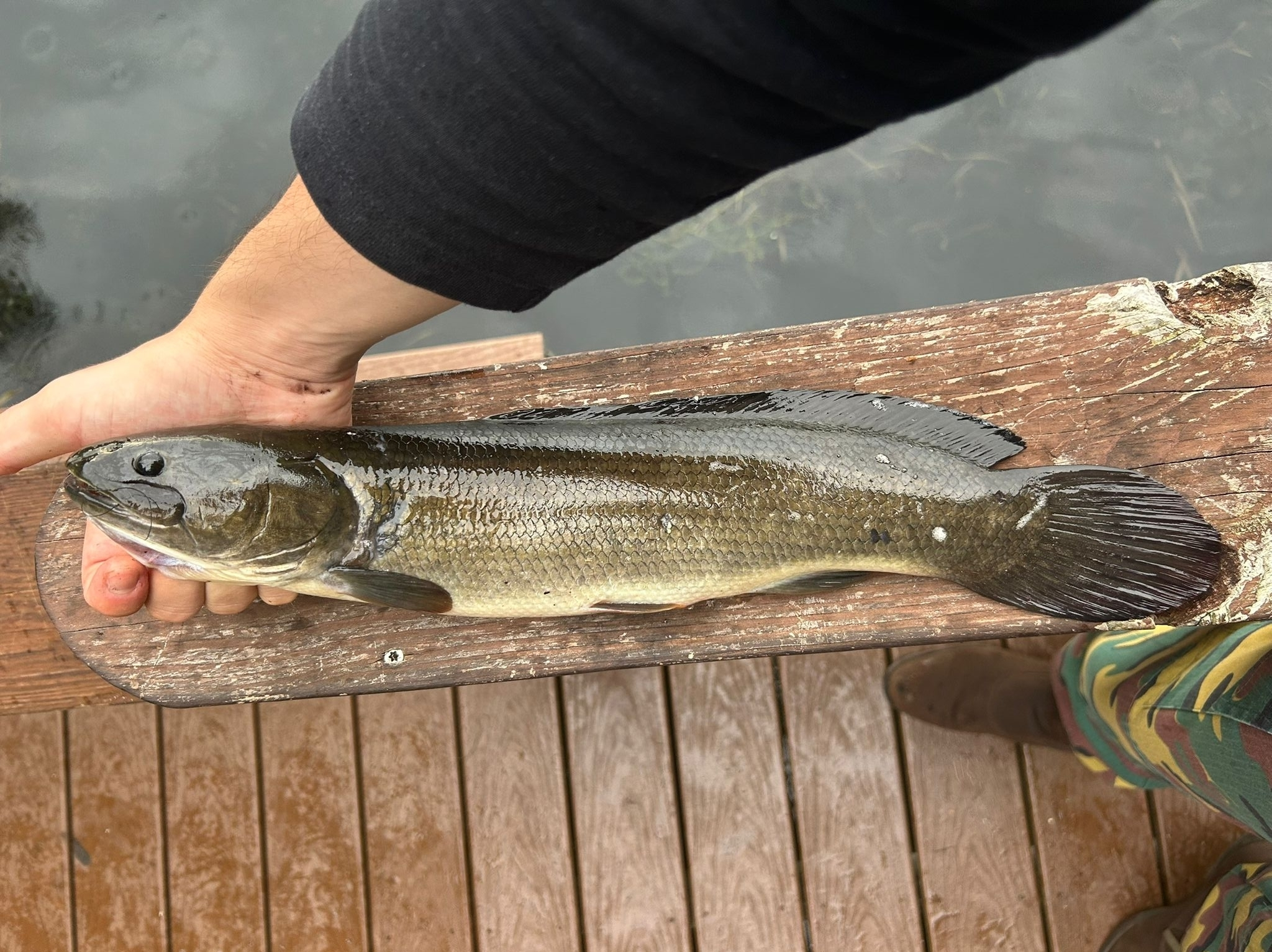
Amia calva in Florida

The typical length of a bowfin is 50 cm (20 in); females typically grow to 65–70 cm (26–28 in), males to 50–65 cm (20–26 in). They can reach 109 cm (43 in) in length, and weigh 9.75 kg (21.5 lb). Young of the year typically grow to 13–23 cm (5.1–9.1 in) by October. Females tend to grow larger than males.

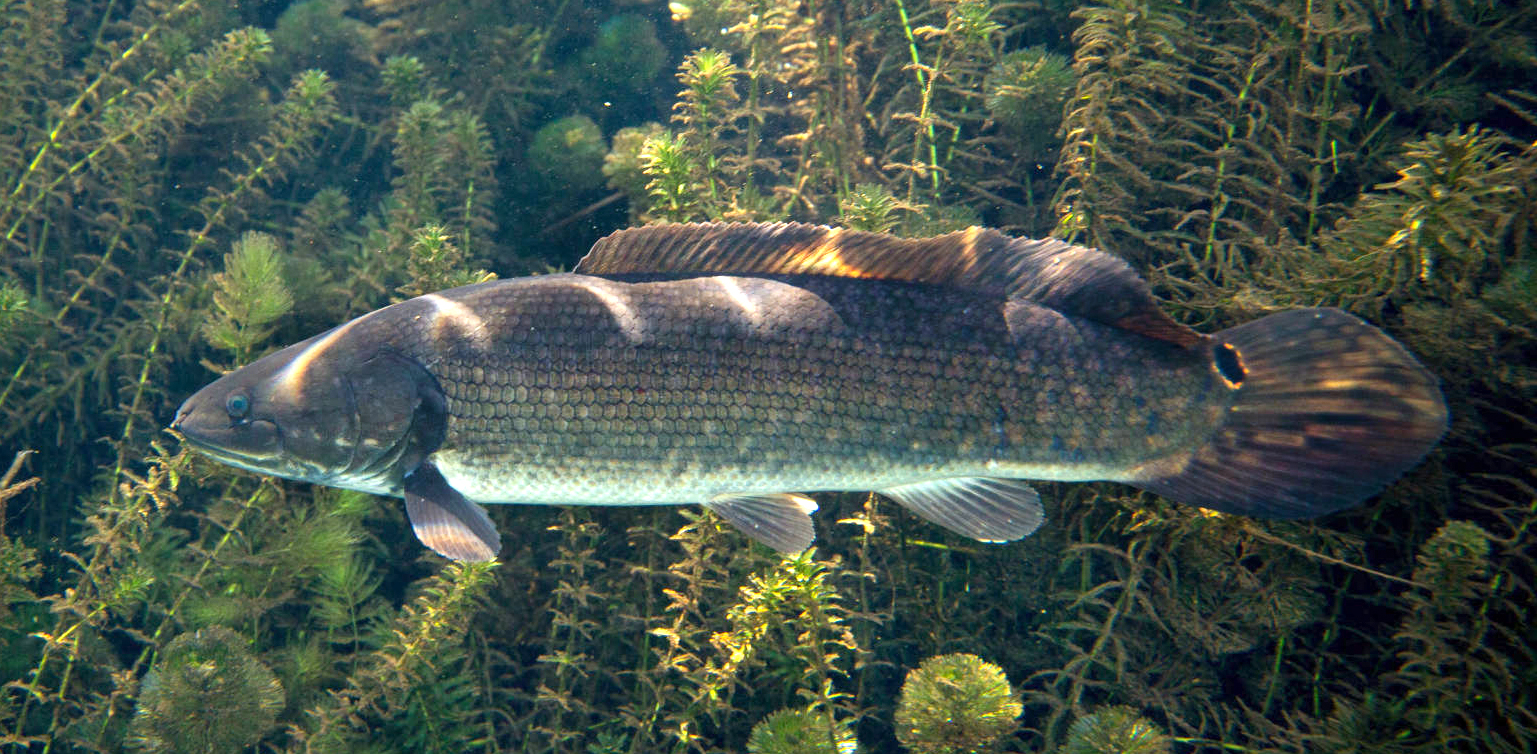
Amia calva in the Wacissa River, Florida

The body of the bowfin is elongated and cylindrical, with the sides and back olive to brown in color, often with vertical bars and dark reticulations or another camouflaged pattern. The dorsal fin has horizontal bars, and the caudal fin has irregular, vertical bars. The underside is white or cream, and the paired fins and anal fin are bright green. During larval stage, hatchlings from about 7–10 mm (0.28–0.39 in) total length are black and tadpole-like in appearance. Around 25 mm (0.98 in) total length, they have been described as looking like miniature placoderms. They grow quickly, and typically leave the nest within 4 to 6 weeks after hatching. Young males have a black eyespot on the base of the tail (caudal peduncle) that is commonly encircled by an orange-yellowish border, while the female's is black, if present at all. The purpose of the eyespot thought to be to confuse predators, deflecting attacks away from the head of the fish to its tail, which affords the bowfin an opportunity to escape predation. The bowfin is so named for its long, undulating dorsal fin consisting of 145 to 250 rays that runs from the middle of the back to the base of the tail.

The skull of the bowfin is made of two layers, the dermatocranium and the chondrocranium. The chondrocranium layer cannot be seen because it is located below the dermal bones. The bowfin skull is made up of 28 fused bones, which compose the dermatocranium. The roof of the mouth is made up of three bones, the ectopterygoid, the palantine, and the vomer. They have two sets of teeth, including one set of larger sharp, teeth coming out of the mandibular and premaxillary bones to grasp and control the prey. The other set of teeth, located posteriorly and connected to the hyomandibular bone, is made up of pharyngeal tooth patches, which are used for sorting out nutrients and grinding down larger pieces of food. Another three bones make up the lower jaw: the dentary, the angular, and the surangular. The cranial surface of the skull is made up of the nasals, the antorbital, the lacrimal, the parietal, the intertemporal, the post parietal, the supratemporal, the extra scapular, the post temporal, and the opercular. The entirety of the skull is attached to the girdle through another set of bones.

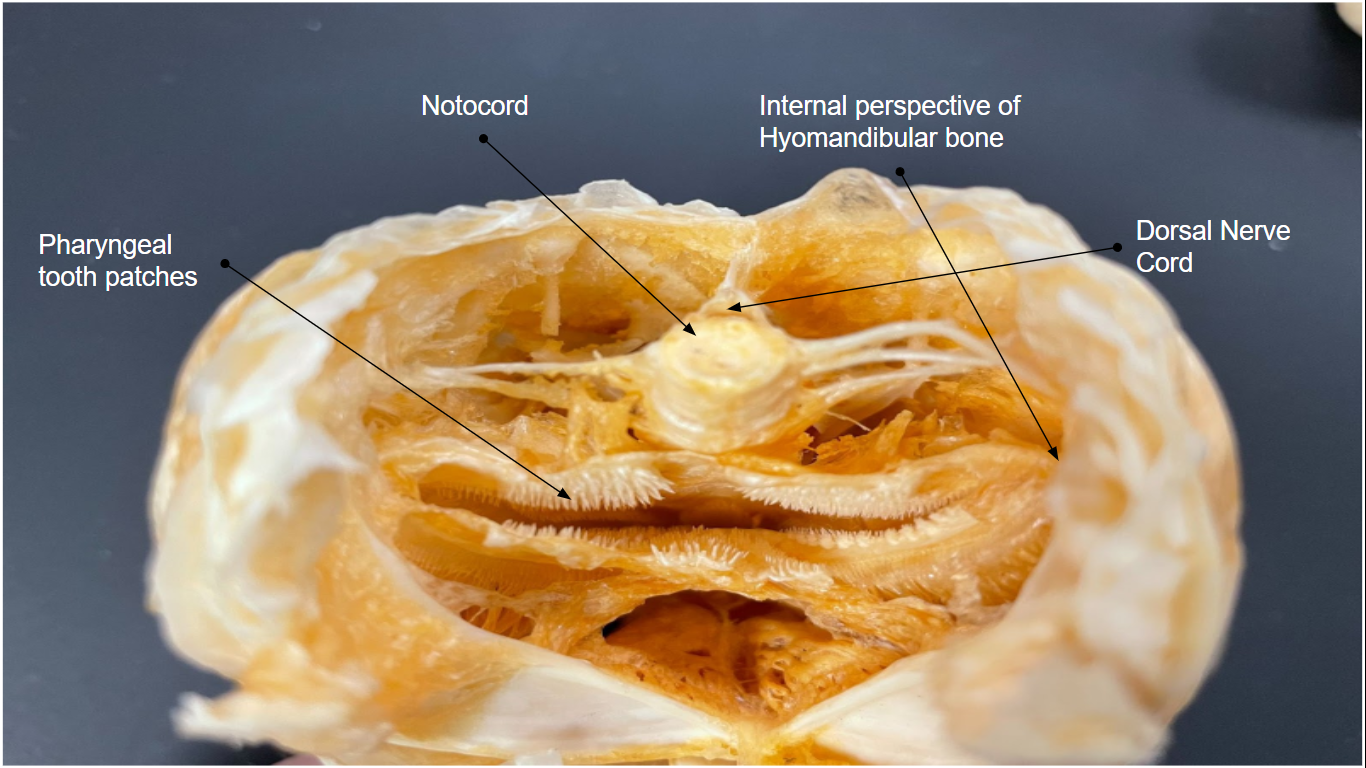
Dorsal view of Amia sp. skull, showing the pharyngeal tooth patches, which are connected to the internal portion of the hyomandibular bone. (Acquired from Pacific Lutheran University)

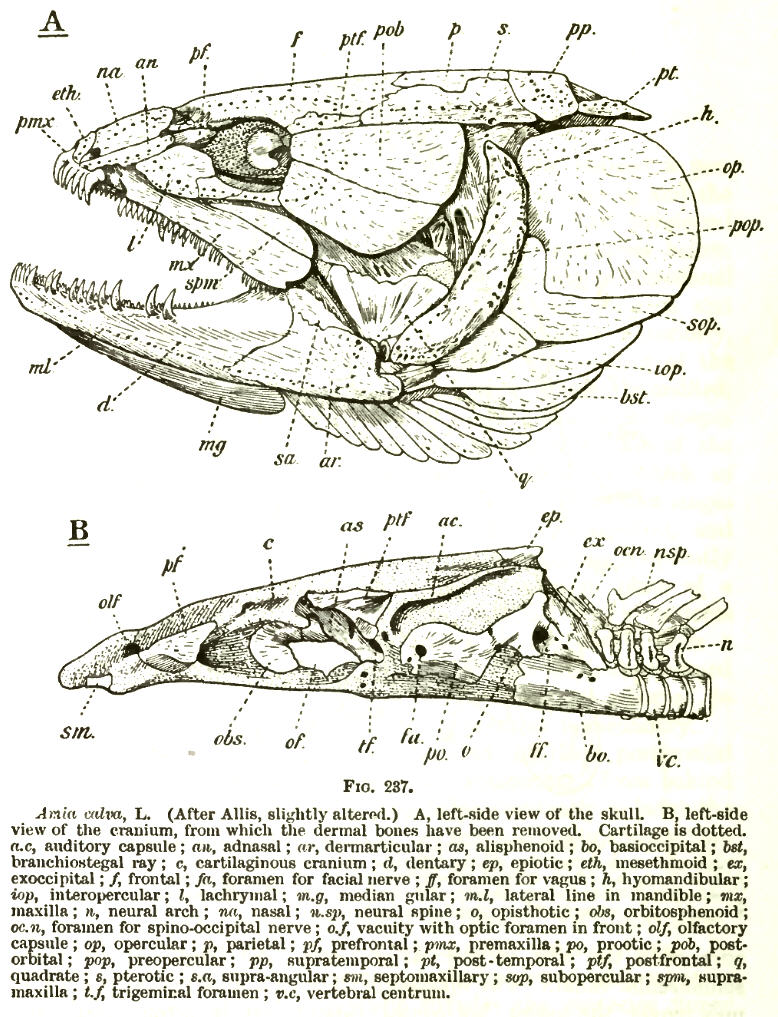
Drawing of Amia sp. skull showing the bony plates protecting the head

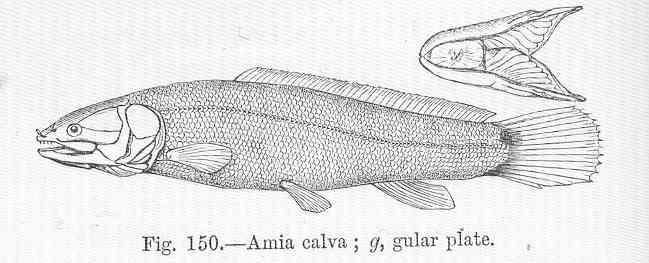
Inset, drawing of Amia sp. gular plate

Bowfin are often referred to as "living fossils" or "primitive fish" because they retained some of the primitive characters common to their ancestors, including a modified (rounded externally) heterocercal caudal fin, a highly vascularized gas bladder lung, vestiges of a spiral valve, and a bony gular plate. The bony gular plate is located underneath the head on the exterior of the lower jaw between the two sides of the lower jaw bone. Other distinguishing characteristics include long, sharp teeth and two protruding, tube-like nostrils. Unlike all of the most primitive actinopterygians, the scales of bowfin differ in that they are not ganoid scales; rather, they are large, single-layered cycloid scales closer in similarity to more derived teleosts.

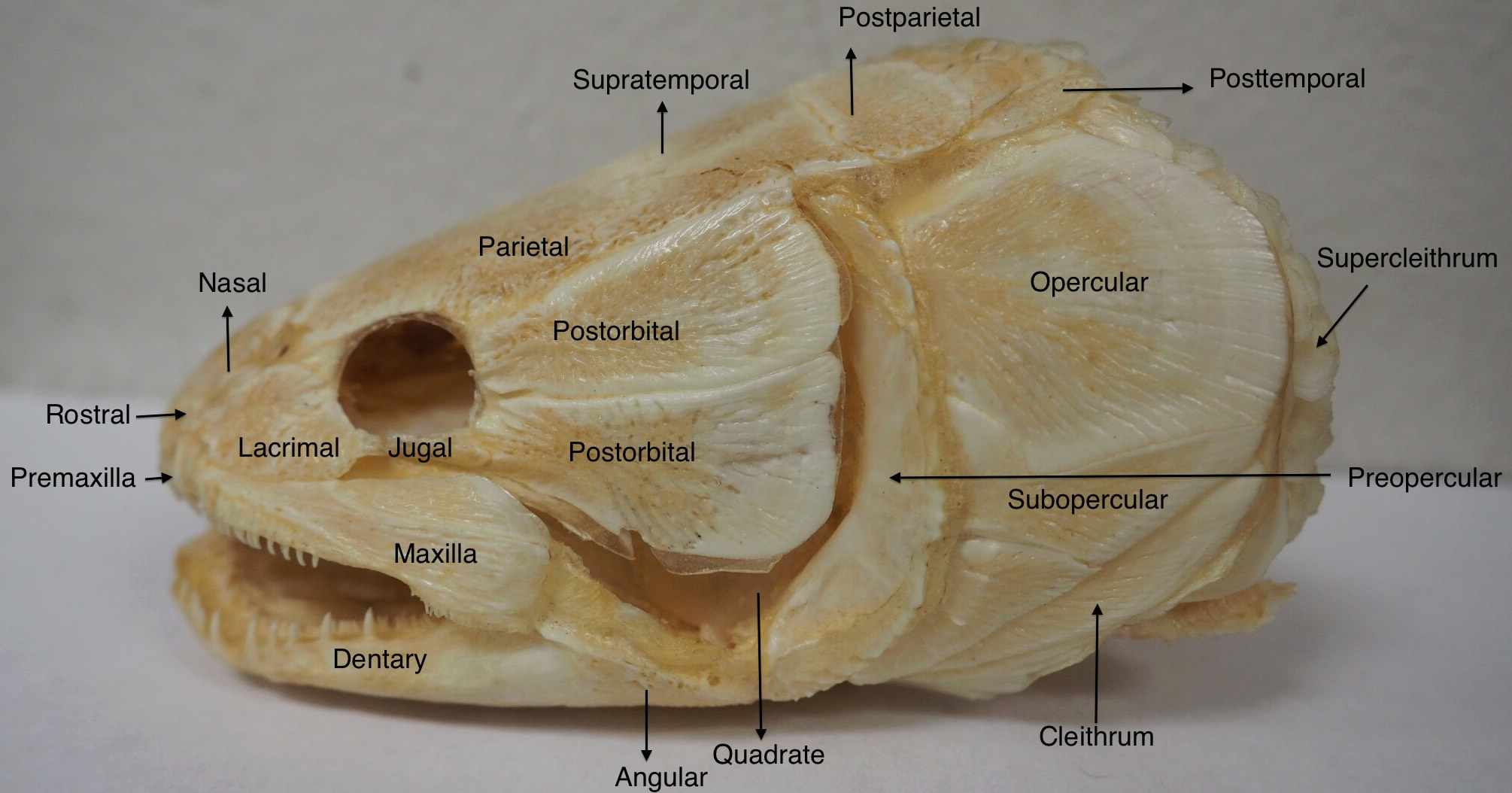
Lateral view of Amia sp. skull: The dermal bones that are seen are composed of the dermatocranium and cover the chondrocranium, which is present but is located underneath the layer of the dermatocranium. This specimen came from the Pacific Lutheran University Natural History collection.

=== Fish similar in appearance ===
Northern snakeheads (Channa argus) are commonly mistaken for bowfin because of similarities in appearance, most noticeably their elongated, cylindrical shape and long dorsal fin that runs along their backs. Northern snakeheads are piscivorous fish native to the rivers and estuaries of China, Russia, and Korea that have been introduced and become established in parts of North America. Unlike bowfin, which are native to North America, though, the northern snakehead is considered an invasive species and environmentally harmful there. Some contrasting differences in bowfin include a black eyespot on their caudal peduncle, a tan and olive coloration, a shorter anal fin, a more rounded head, pelvic fins at a greater distance from the pectoral fins than in the northern snakehead, and the presence of the gular plate on the ventral side of the lower jaw. Another noticeable difference is that bowfin scales do not continue uniformly from their body to their head. Bowfin heads are smooth and free of scales, whereas the northern snakehead has scales that uniformly continue from its body through to its head.

The burbot (Lota lota), a predatory fish native to streams and lakes of North America and Eurasia, is also commonly mistaken for bowfin. Burbots can be distinguished by their flat head and chin barbel, long anal fin, and pelvic fins situated beneath the pectoral fins.

== Bowfin body-shape evolution and development ==
The first fish lacked jaws and used negative pressure to suck their food in through their mouths. The jaw in the bowfin is a result of its evolutionary need to be able to catch and eat bigger and more nutritious prey. As a result of being able to gather more nutrients, the bowfin is able to live a more active lifestyle. The jaw of a bowfin has several adaptations. The maxilla and premaxilla are fused and the posterior chondrocranium articulates with the vertebra, which allows the jaw freedom to rotate. The suspensorium includes several bones and articulates with the snout, brain case, and mandible. When the jaw opens, epaxial muscles lift the chondrocranium, which is attached to the upper jaw, while adductor muscles act to close the lower jaw. This ability to open and close the jaw helps the bowfin to be an active predator that can catch bigger prey and digest them.

The vertebral column in bowfin is ossified and in comparison to earlier fish, the centra are the major support for the body, whereas in earlier fish, the notochord was the main form of support. In the bowfin, neural spines and ribs also increase in prominence, an evolutionary aspect that helps provide additional support and stabilize unpaired fins. The evolution of the vertebral column allows the bowfin to withstand lateral bending that puts the column under compression without breaking. This, in turn, allows the bowfin to have more controlled and powerful movements, in comparison to fish that have only a notochord. The bowfin has a rounded, heterocercal tail that resembles a homocercal tail. This type of tail gives the body a streamlined shape, which allows the bowfin to improve its swimming ability by reducing drag. These types of tails are common in fish with gas bladders, because the bladder supplies the fish with natural buoyancy.

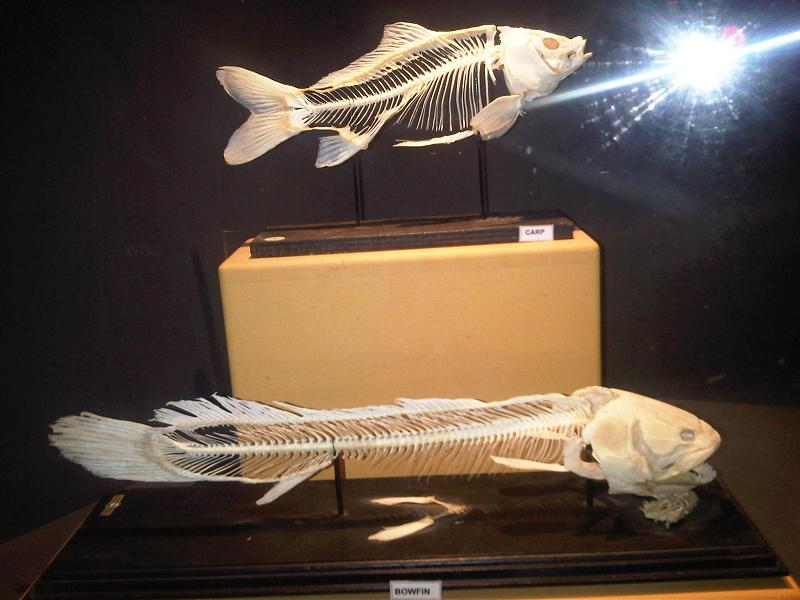
The lower figure is a skeleton of Amia sp. The pelvic and pectoral girdles are both visible and the axial and cranial elements are also both present.

The bowfin is a member of Actinopterygii, which means that the pectoral girdle is partly endochondral but mostly dermal bone. In this group of fishes, the fins function to maneuver, brake, and adjust positions. The pectoral girdle of the bowfin has six parts. The posttemporal, supracleithrum, postcleithrum, cleithrum, scapulacoracoid, and clavicle make up the pectoral girdle. The pectoral girdle is attached to the skull. The paired pectoral and pelvic fins of fish are homologous with the limbs of tetrapods.

== Physiology ==
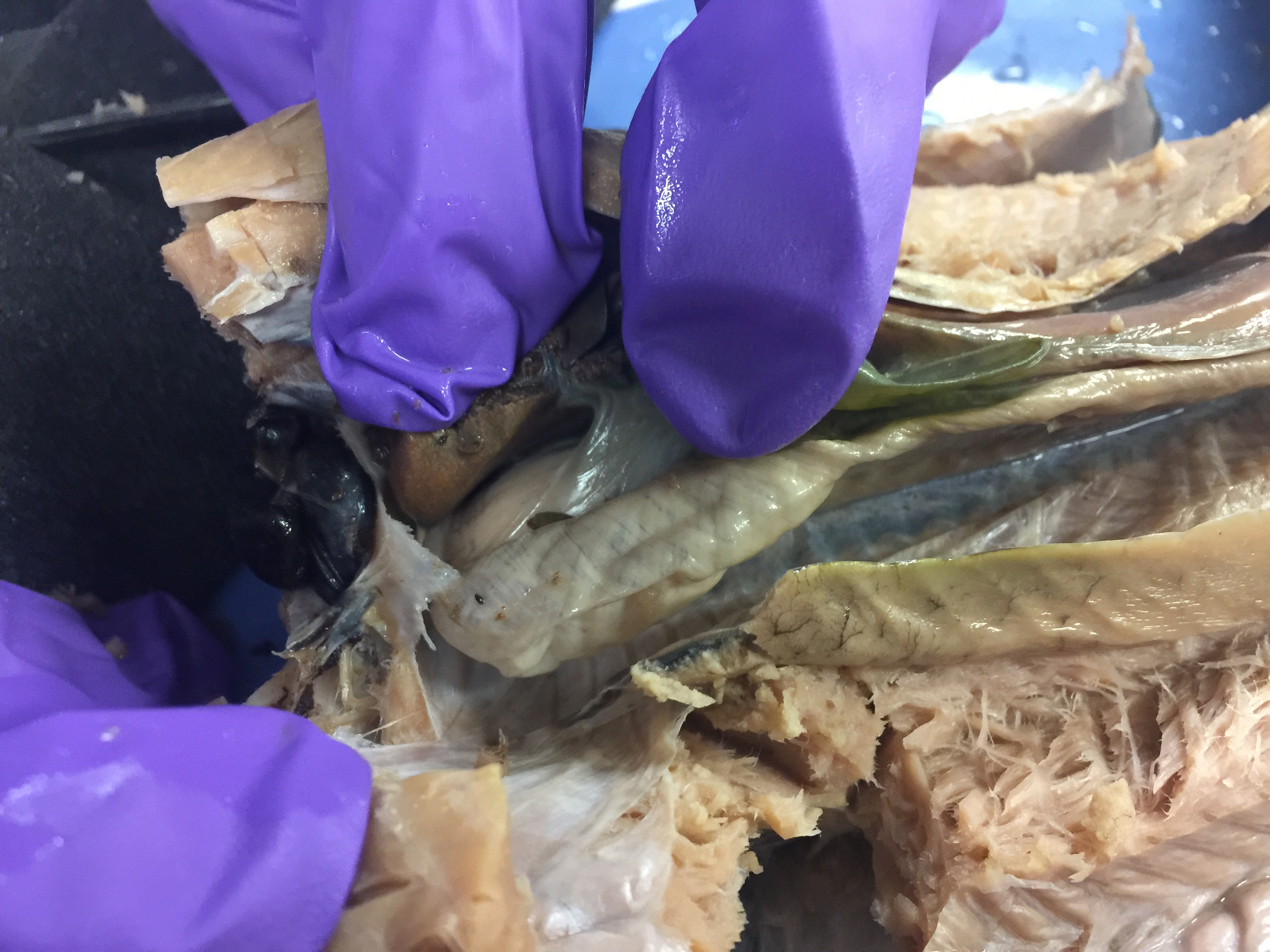
Dissection of Amia sp. swim bladder

Bowfin are physostomes, meaning they have a small "pneumatic duct" that connects their swim bladders to their digestive tracts. This allows them, like lungfish, to "breathe" in two ways; they can extract oxygen from the water when breathing through their gills, but can also break the water's surface to breathe or gulp air through the pneumatic duct. When performing low-level physical activity, bowfin obtain more than half of their oxygen from breathing air. The fish have two distinct air-breathing mechanisms used to ventilate the gas bladder. Air-breathing type I is consistent with the action of exhale/inhale exchange, stimulated by either air or water hypoxia, to regulate O_{2} gas exchange; type II air breaths are inhalation alone, which is believed to regulate gas bladder volume to control buoyancy. Bimodal respiration helps bowfin survive and maintain their metabolic rate in hypoxic conditions. Bowfin breathe air more frequently when they are in darkness, and correspondingly more active.

Bowfin blood can adapt to warm, acidic waters. The fish becomes inactive in waters below 10 °C (50 °F); at this temperature, they breathe almost no air, but with increasing temperature, their air breathing increases. Their preferred temperature range is between 12 and 26 °C (54 and 79 °F), with 18 °C (64 °F) the temperature of maximum activity. Air breathing is at a maximum in the range 18.4–29.6 °C (65.1–85.3 °F). Bowfin do not use central chemoreceptor regulation for respiration control. Experiments manipulating the oxygen content, carbon dioxide content, and pH of bowfin extradural fluid did not affect breathing rate, heart rate, or blood pressure, pointing to a lack of central chemoreceptor regulation. Instead, bowfin respiratory patterns respond to water oxygen content and water temperature, as water temperatures play a role in oxygen content. In the laboratory, bowfin showed an increase in breathing rate when the temperatures were raised above 10 °C. Bowfin also showed an increase in breathing rate when exposed to lower oxygen levels in the water.

Herpetologist W. T. Neill reported in 1950 that he unearthed a bowfin aestivating (in a dormant state) in a chamber 4 inches (10 cm) below the ground surface, 8 inches (20 cm) in diameter, 0.25 miles (0.4 km) from a river. Flood levels, of note, had previously reached the area and receded. Not unusually, riverine species like bowfin move into backwaters with flood currents and become trapped when water levels recede. While aestivation is anecdotally documented by multiple researchers, laboratory experiments have suggested, instead, that bowfin are physiologically incapable of surviving more than 3 to 5 days of air exposure, but no field manipulation has been performed. Regardless of the lack of evidence confirming the bowfin's ability to aestivate, bowfin can survive prolonged conditions of exposure to air because they have the ability to breathe air. Their gill filaments and lamellae are rigid in structure, which helps prevent the lamellae from collapsing and aids gas exchange even during air exposure.

== Evolution and phylogeny ==
Competing hypotheses and debates continue over the evolution of Amia and relatives, including their relationship among basal extant teleosts, and organization of clades. Bowfin are the last remaining member of the Halecomorphi, a group that includes many extinct species in several families. Halecomorphs were generally accepted as the sister group to Teleostei, but not without question. While a halecostome pattern of neopterygian clades was produced in morphology-based analyses of extant actinopterygians, a different result was produced with fossil taxa, which showed a monophyletic Holostei. Monophyletic Holostei were also recovered by at least two nuclear gene analyses, in an independent study of fossil and extant fish, and in an analysis of ultraconserved genomic elements.

The extant ray-finned fish of the subclass Actinopterygii include 42 orders, 431 families, and over 23,000 species. They are currently classified into two infraclasses, Chondrostei (holosteans) and Neopterygii (teleost fishes). Sturgeons, paddlefish, bichirs, and reed fish compose the 38 species of chondrosteans and are considered relict species. Included in the over 23,000 species of neopterygians are eight relict species comprising gars and the bowfin.

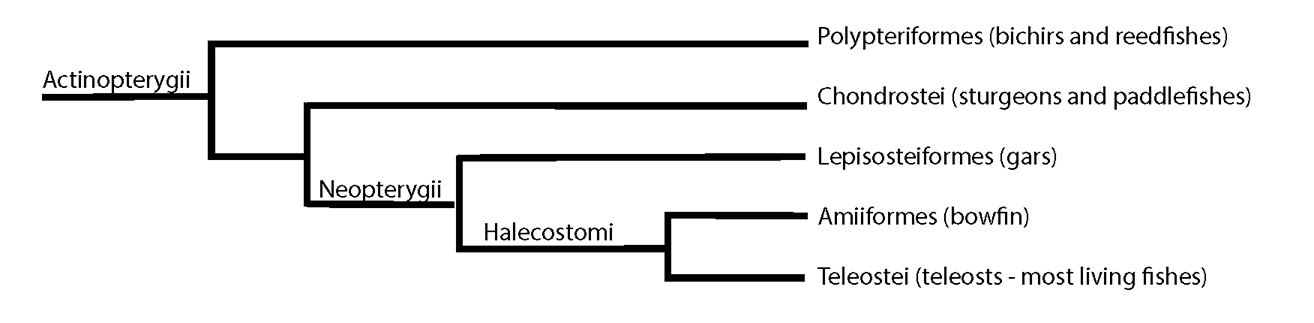
Three divisions of Neopterygii comprising Lepisosteiformes, Amiiformes, and Teleostei

=== Infraclass Neopterygii ===
Neopterygians are the second major occurrence in the evolution of ray-finned fish and today include the majority of modern bony fish. They are distinguished from their earlier ancestors by major changes to the jaws, shape of the skull, and tail. They have three divisions:

- Division 1. Order Lepisosteiformes – the relict gars, which include extant species of gars that first appeared in the Cretaceous
- Division 2. Order Amiiformes – the relict bowfin, (halecomorphids), the only extant species in the order Amiiformes, which date back to the Triassic period
- Division 3. Division Teleostei – the stem group of Teleostei from which modern fish arose, including most of the bony fish familiar today

=== Species ===
The species are described:

- Amia calva Linnaeus 1766 (bowfin)
- †Amia depressa Marsh 1871
- †A. dictyocephala Cope 1875
- †A. elegans Leidy 1873
- †A. exilis Lambe 1908
- †A. fragosa (Jordan 1927)
- †A. godai Yabumoto & Grande 2013
- †A. gracilis Leidy 1873
- †A. lewesiensis Mantell 1822
- †A. macrospondyla Cope 1891
- †A. media Leidy 1873
- †A. morini Priem 1911
- †A. newberriana Marsh 1871
- Amia ocellicauda Todd 1837 (eyetail bowfin)* †A. selwyniana Ami 1891
- †A. uintaensis Leidy 1873
- †A. whiteavesiana Cope 1891
- †A. pattersoni
- †A. scutata Cope 1875

=== Genome evolution ===
The bowfin genome contains an intact ParaHox gene cluster, similar to the bichir and most other vertebrates. This is in contrast, however, with teleost fish, which have a fragmented ParaHox cluster, probably because of a whole genome duplication event in their lineage. The presence of an intact ParaHox gene cluster suggests that bowfin ancestors separated from other fish before the last common ancestor of all teleosts appeared. Bowfin are thus possibly a better model to study vertebrate genome organization than common teleost model organisms such as zebrafish.

== Feeding behavior ==
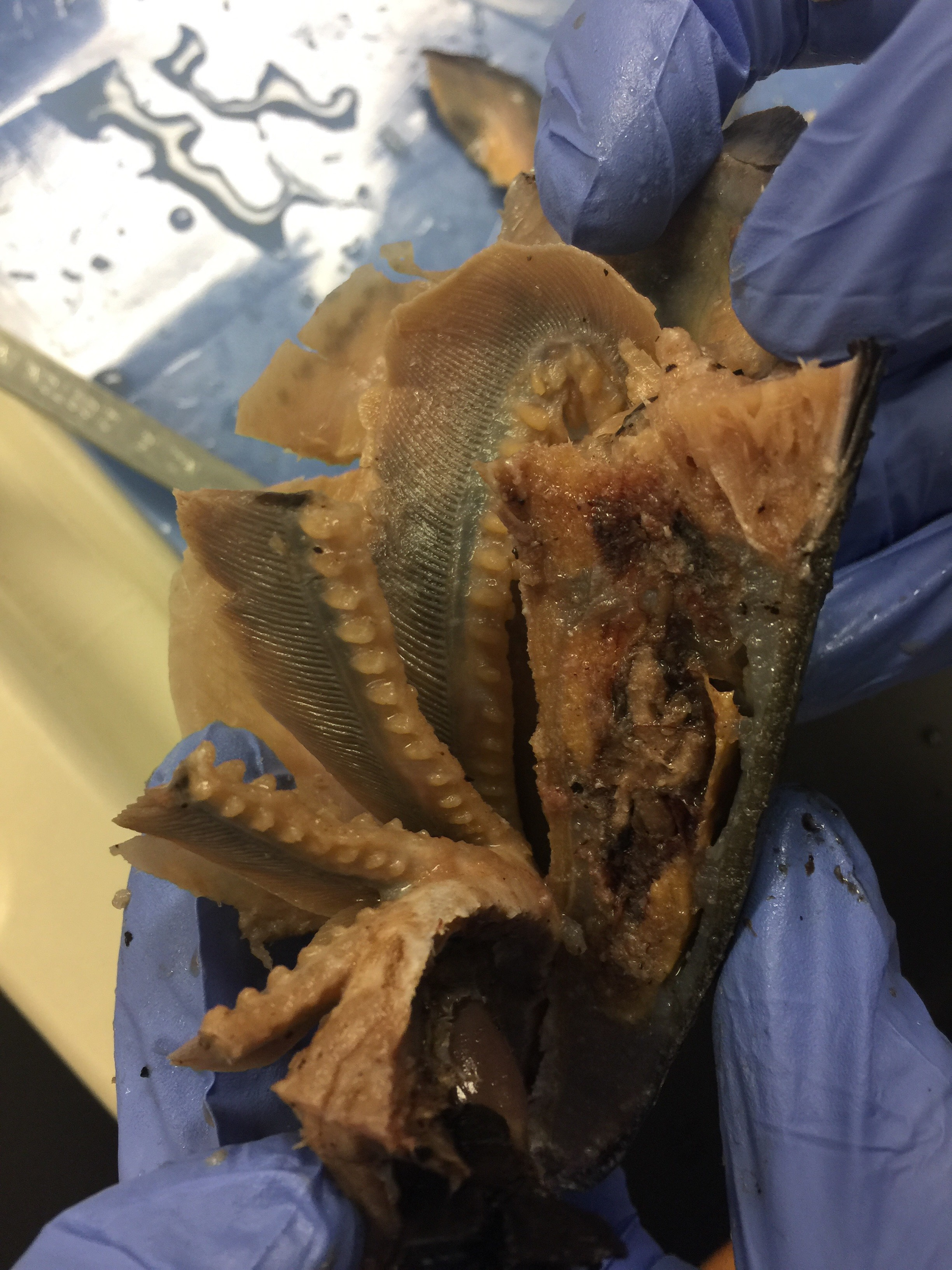
Amia sp. gill rakers are short with blunt processes and with a small space in between them. They are connected to the gill arch of the gills.

Bowfin are stalking, ambush predators that customarily move into the shallows at night to prey on fish, amphibians, and aquatic invertebrates such as crawfish, other crustaceans, mollusks, and aquatic insects. Young bowfin feed mostly on small crustaceans, while adults are mostly piscivorous, but also known to be opportunistic. Some common examples of prey include frogs, bass, other bowfin, dragonflies, sunfish, crawfish, etc. Bowfin are remarkably agile, can move quickly through the water, and have a voracious appetite. Their undulating dorsal fin propels them silently through the water while stalking their prey. The attack is straightforward and swift, with a movement that lasts about 0.075 seconds. Also, some studies indicate a capacity of the bowfin to survive without food. In 1916, a female bowfin was starved for 20 months, the longest period then known that any vertebrate had been without food. Some independent studies focus on the bowfin's ability to use organic material as a source of food and studied the structure of the gill raker. They concluded that it did not benefit from the organic material in the water because the gill rakers were short with blunt processes and a short space between them. Even bacteria could enter and exit through the gill easily. Its structure alone indicated that the Amia species do not use microorganisms as a source of food.

== Distribution and habitat ==
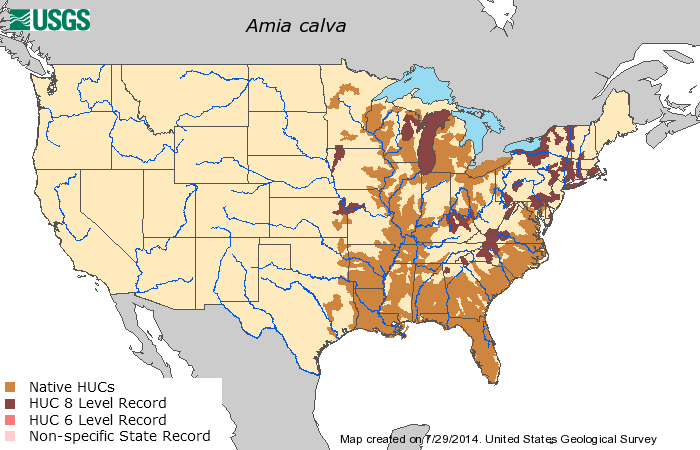
Amia calva distribution in the Eastern U.S., as well as from the St. Lawrence River and Lake Champlain drainage of southern Ontario and Quebec, westward around Great Lakes in southern Ontario into Minnesota Nota bene: this includes populations now known to be Amia ocellicauda.

Fossil deposits indicate the amiiforms included freshwater and marine species that were once widely distributed in North America, South America, Eurasia, and Africa. Today, the two species of Amia are the only remaining species in the order Amiiformes; they are demersal, freshwater piscivores, and their range is restricted to freshwater environments in North America, including much of the Eastern United States and adjacent southern Canada from the St. Lawrence River and Lake Champlain drainage of southern Ontario and Quebec westward around the Great Lakes in southern Ontario into Minnesota.

Historically, their distribution in North America included the drainage basins of the Mississippi River from Quebec to northern Minnesota, the St. Lawrence-Great Lakes, including Georgian Bay, Lake Nipissing, and Simcoe, Ontario, south to the Gulf of Mexico; Atlantic and Gulf Coastal Plain from the Susquehanna River drainage in southeastern Pennsylvania to the Colorado River in Texas.

=== Stocking ===
Research from the late 1800s to the 1980s suggests a trend of intentional stockings of nonindigenous fish into ponds, lakes, and rivers in the United States. At that time, little was known about environmental impacts or long-term effects of new species establishment and spread as a result of "fish rescue and transfer" efforts, or the importance of nongame fish to the ecological balance of aquatic ecosystems. Introductions of bowfin to areas they were considered a nonindigenous species included various lakes, rivers, and drainages in Connecticut, Delaware, Georgia, Illinois, Iowa, Kansas, Kentucky, Maryland, Massachusetts, Minnesota, Missouri, New Jersey, New York, North Carolina, Ohio, Oklahoma, Pennsylvania, Virginia, West Virginia, and Wisconsin. Many of the introductions were intentional stockings, positively determining distribution resulting from flood transfers, or other inadvertent migrations is not possible. Bowfin are typically piscivorous, but as an introduced species, they are capable of being voracious predators that pose a threat to native fish and their prey.

=== Preferred habitat ===
Bowfin prefer vegetated sloughs, lowland rivers and lakes, swamps, and backwater areas, and are occasionally found in brackish water. They are well camouflaged and difficult to spot in slow water with abundant vegetation. They often seek shelter under roots and submerged logs. Oxygen-poor environments can be tolerated because of their ability to breathe air.

== Lifecycle ==
Bowfin spawn in the spring or early summer, typically between April and June, more commonly at night in abundantly vegetated, clear, shallow water in weed beds over sand bars and also under stumps, logs, and bushes. Optimum temperatures for nesting and spawning range between 16 and 19 °C (61 and 66 °F). The males construct circular nests in fibrous root mats, clearing away leaves and stems. Depending on the density of surrounding vegetation, a tunnel-like entrance may be at one side. The diameter of the nests commonly range between 39 and 91 cm (15 and 36 in), at a water depth of 61–92 cm (24–36 in).

During spawning season, the fins and underside of male bowfin often change in color to a bright lime green. The courtship/spawning sequence lasts 1-3 hours and can repeat up to five times. Courtship begins when a female approaches the nest. The ritual consists of intermittent nose bites, nudges, and chasing behavior by the male until the female becomes receptive, when the pair lie side by side in the nest. She deposits her eggs, while he shakes his fins in a vibratory movement, and releases his milt for fertilization to occur. A male often has eggs from more than one female in his nest, and a single female often spawns in several nests.

Females vacate the nest after spawning, leaving the male behind to protect the eggs during the 8-10 days of incubation. A nest may contain 2,000 to 5,000 eggs, possibly more. Fecundity is usually related to size of the fish, so the roe of a large gravid female may contain over 55,000 eggs. Bowfin eggs are adhesive, and attach to aquatic vegetation, roots, gravel, and sand. After hatching, larval bowfin do not swim actively in search of food. During the 7-9 days required for yolk-sac absorption, they attach to vegetation by means of an adhesive organ on their snout, and remain protected by the parent male bowfin. Bowfin aggressively protect their spawn from the first day of incubation to a month or so after the eggs have hatched. When the fry are able to swim and forage on their own, they form a school and leave the nest accompanied by the parent male bowfin, which slowly circles them to prevent separation.

Bowfin reach sexually maturity at 2-3 years of age. They can live up to 30 years in captivity.

== Diseases ==
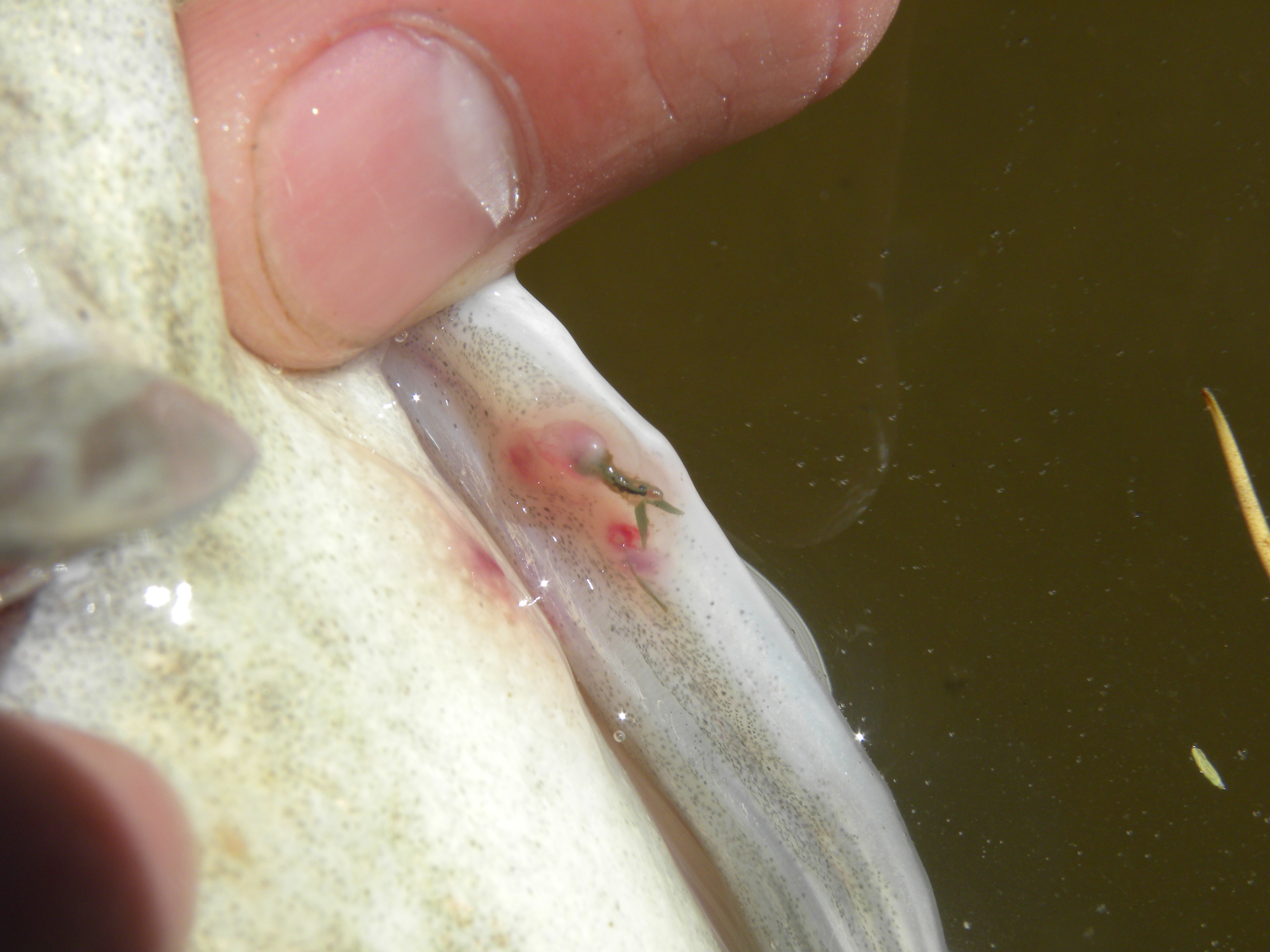
Lernaea, or anchor worm, on a Murray cod: This parasite also attacks bowfin.

A common parasite of bowfin is the anchor worm (Lernaea species). These small crustaceans infest the skin and bases of fins, with consequences ranging from slowed growth to death. The mollusk Megalonaias gigantea lays eggs in the bowfin gills that are then externally fertilized by sperm passing in the water flow. The small glochidia larvae then hatch and develop in the gill tubes.

Bowfin with liver cancer or fatal leukemia have been reported.

== Uses ==
As a sport fish, bowfin are not considered desirable to many anglers. They were once considered a nuisance fish by anglers and early biologists, who believed the bowfin's predatory nature was harmful to sportfish populations. As a result, efforts were taken to reduce their numbers. Research has since proven otherwise, and with knowledge and a better understanding of maintaining overall balance of ecosystems, regulations were introduced to help protect and maintain viable populations of bowfin. Bowfin are strong fighters, a prized trait in game fish. However, they do have a jaw full of sharp teeth that requires careful handling. The current tackle record is 21.5 lb (9.8 kg)

Bowfin were once considered to have little commercial value because of their poor-tasting meat, which has been referred to as "soft, bland-tasting, and of poor texture". It is considered quite palatable, though, if cleaned properly and smoked, prepared fried or blackened, or used in courtbouillion or fish balls or cakes. Over the years, global efforts have imposed strict regulations on the international trade of caviar, particularly on the harvest of sturgeons from the Caspian Sea, where the highly prized caviar from the beluga sturgeon originates. The bans imposed on Caspian sturgeons have created lucrative markets for affordable substitutes in the United States, including paddlefish, bowfin, and various other species of sturgeon. In Louisiana, bowfin are harvested in the wild and cultured commercially in hatcheries for their meat and roe. The roe is processed into caviar, and sold as "Cajun caviar", or marketed under the trade name "Choupiquet Royale".

== Accumulation of toxic substances ==
In some areas of the United States where aquatic environments have tested positive for elevated levels of toxins, such as mercury, arsenic, chromium, and copper, signs are posted with warnings about the consumption of fish caught in those areas. Concentration of mercury biomagnifies as it passes up the food chain from organisms on lower trophic levels to apex predators. It bioaccumulates in the tissues of larger, long-lived, predatory fish. When compared to smaller, short-lived fish, bowfin tend to concentrate mercury at higher levels, thereby making them less safe for human consumption.
