= Eagle syndrome =

- Other names: Styloid syndrome
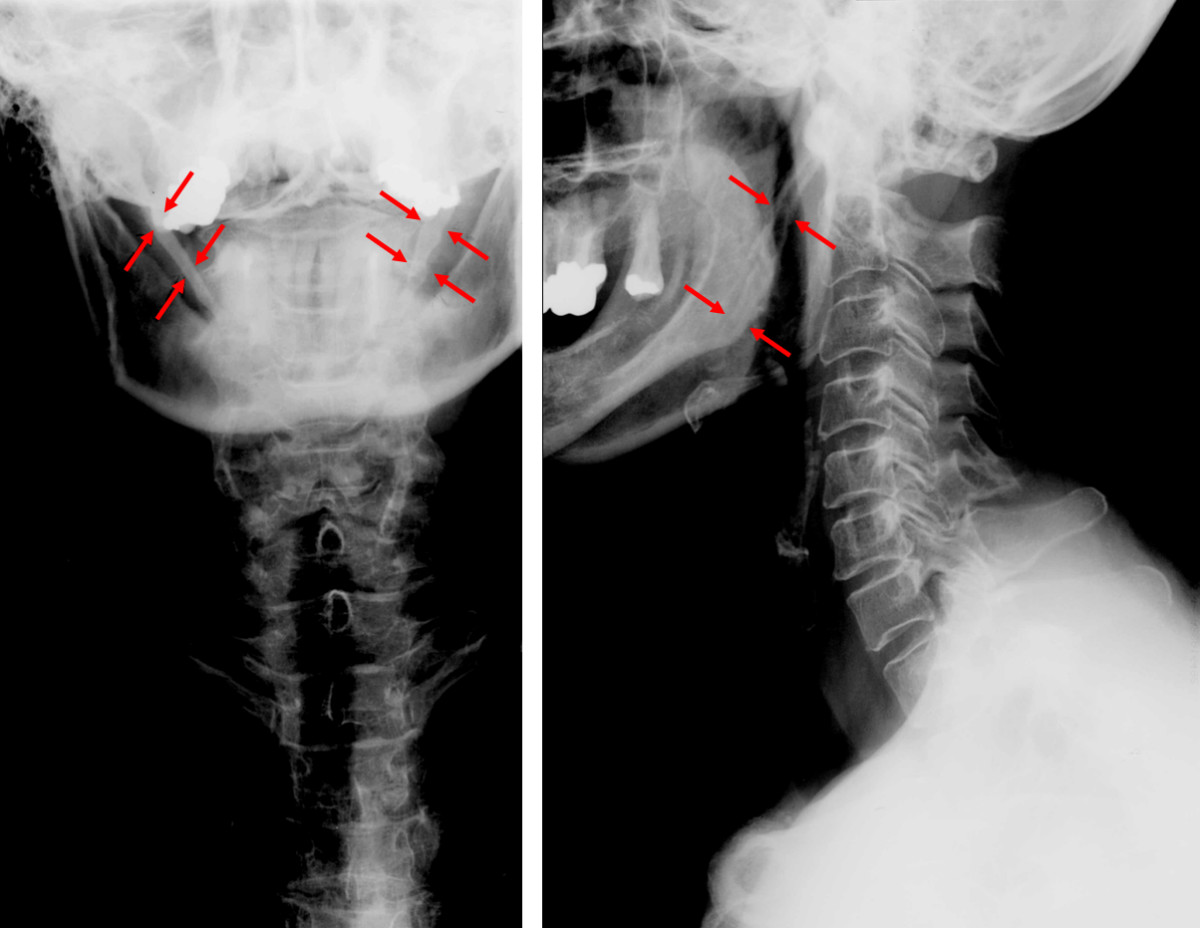
- Anteroposterior and lateral radiographs of cervical spine showing ossification of the stylohyoid ligament on both sides

Eagle syndrome (also termed stylohyoid syndrome, styloid syndrome, stylalgia, styloid-stylohyoid syndrome, or styloid–carotid artery syndrome) is an uncommon condition commonly characterized but not limited to sudden, sharp nerve-like pain in the jaw bone and joint, back of the throat, and base of the tongue, triggered by swallowing, moving the jaw, or turning the neck. First described by American otorhinolaryngologist Watt Weems Eagle in 1937, the condition is caused by an elongated or misshapen styloid process (the slender, pointed piece of bone just below the ear) and/or calcification of the stylohyoid ligament, either of which interferes with the functioning of neighboring regions in the body, such as the glossopharyngeal nerve.

== Signs and symptoms ==
Possible symptoms include:

- Sharp, shooting pain in the jaw, back of the throat, base of the tongue, ears, neck, and/or face
- Difficulty swallowing
- Sensation of having a foreign object in throat
- Pain from chewing, swallowing, turning the neck, or touching the back of the throat
- Ringing or buzzing in the ears

Classic Eagle syndrome is present on only one side; however, it may rarely be present on both sides.

In vascular Eagle syndrome, the elongated styloid process comes in contact with the internal carotid artery below the skull. In these cases, turning the head can cause compression of the artery or a tear inside the blood vessel, which restricts blood flow and can potentially lead to a transient ischemic attack or stroke. Sometimes, compression of the internal jugular vein can also occur and might lead to increased intracranial pressure.

== Cause ==
Eagle syndrome occurs due to elongation of the styloid process or calcification of the stylohyoid ligament, potentially compressing the nearby carotid artery or glossopharyngeal nerve. However, the cause of the elongation hasn't been known clearly. It could occur spontaneously or could arise since birth. Usually normal stylohyoid process is 2.5–3 cm in length, if the length is longer than 3 cm, it is classified as an elongated stylohyoid process. There are reports of Eagle syndrome induced by wisdom tooth removal.

== Diagnosis ==
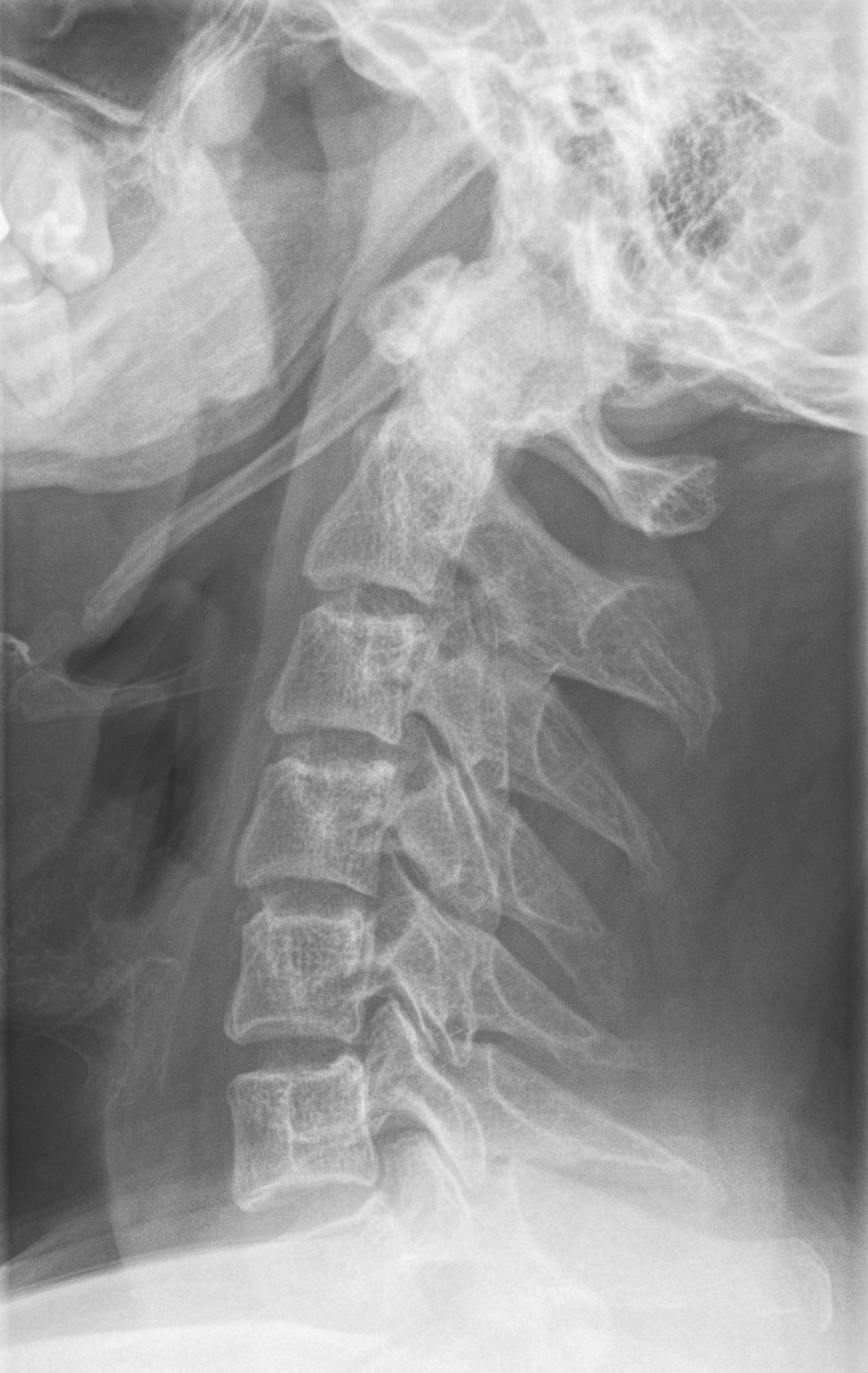
Radiograph, lateral view showing elongated stylohyoid process and stylohyoid ligament ossification

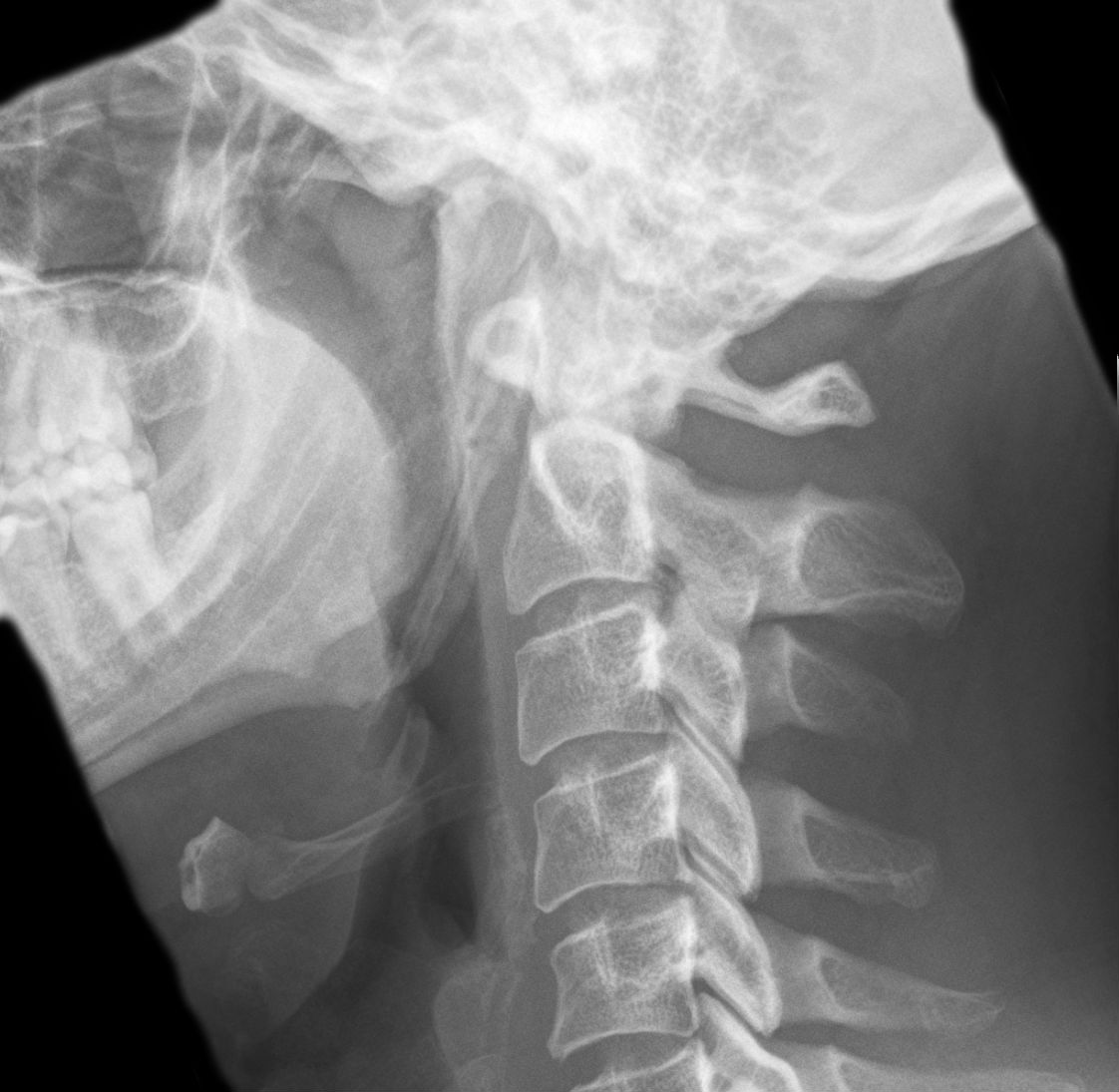
Radiograph, lateral view showing joint-like formation in ossified stylohyoid ligament

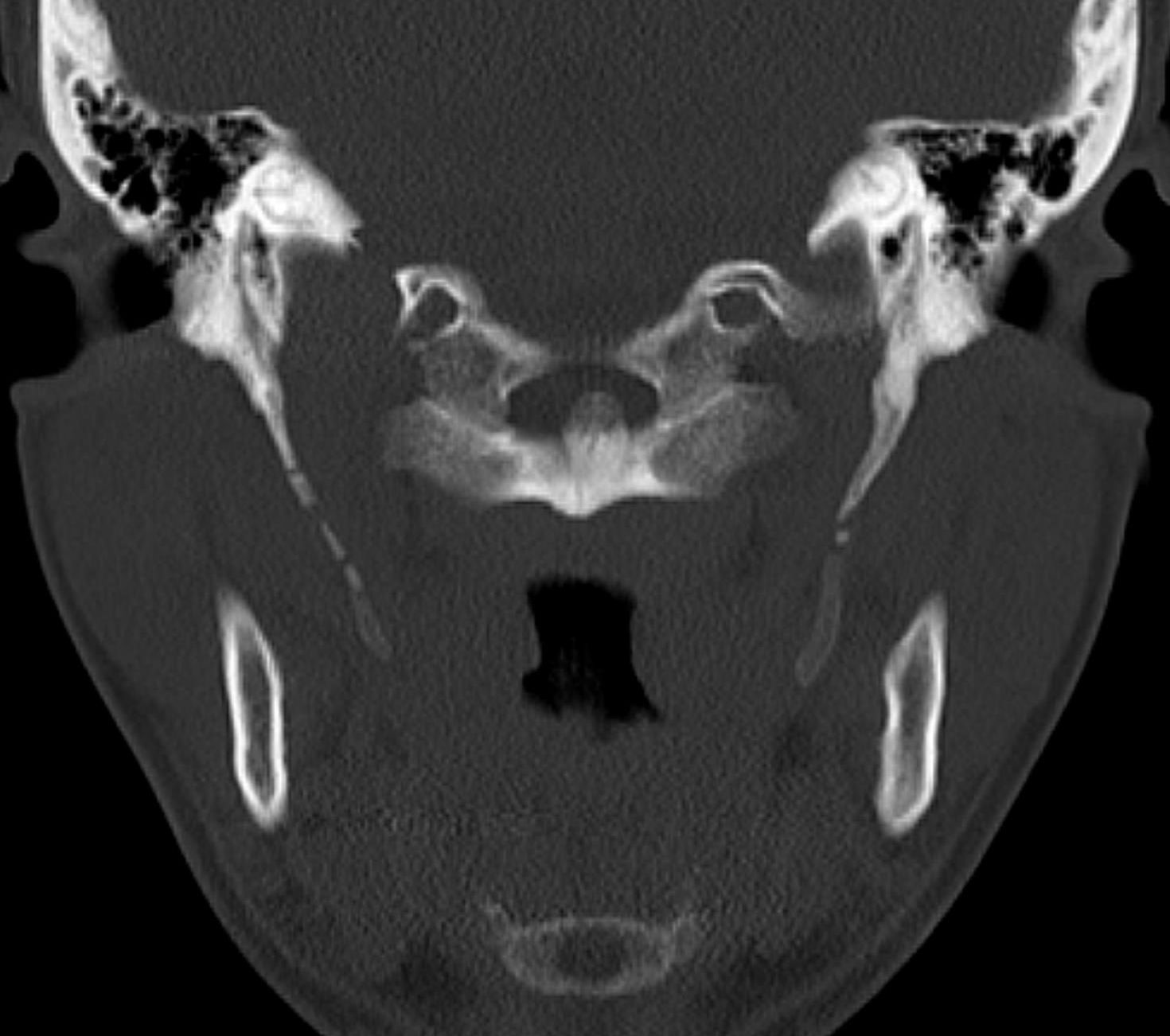
CT scan, coronal section showing bilateral extended styloid process and stylohyoid ligament ossification (incidental finding)

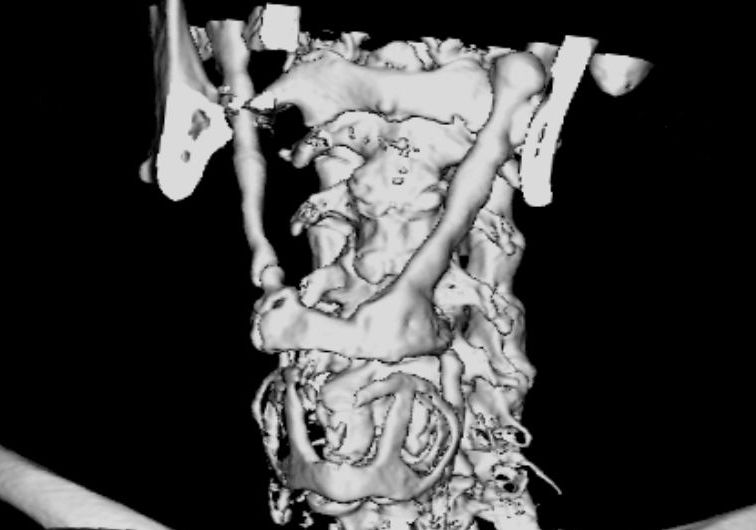
3D-reconstructed CT scan showing bilateral stylohyoid ligament ossification

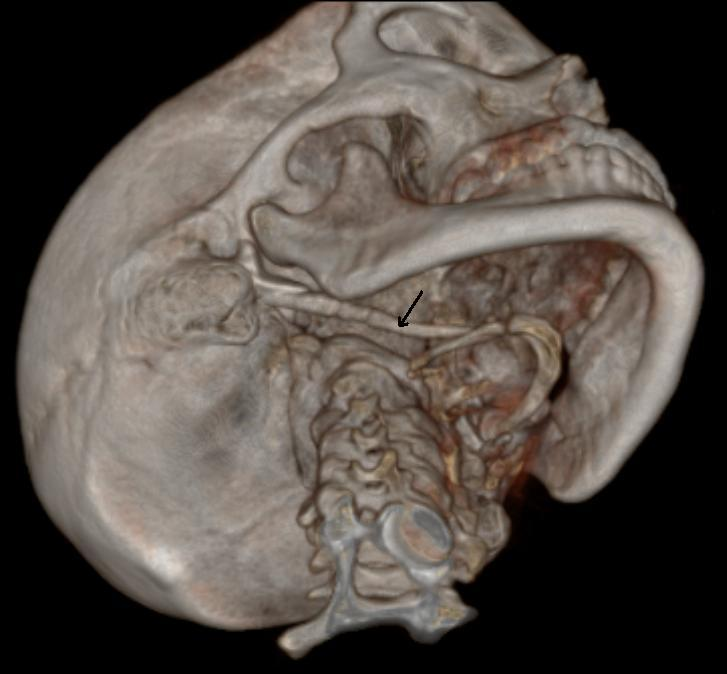
3D reconstructed CT scan showing elongated styloid process (right side)

Diagnosis is suspected when a patient presents with the symptoms of the classic form of "Eagle syndrome" e.g. unilateral neck pain, sore throat or tinnitus. Sometimes the tip of the styloid process is palpable in the back of the throat. The diagnosis of the vascular type is more difficult and requires an expert opinion. One should have a high level of suspicion when neurological symptoms occur upon head rotation. Symptoms tend to be worsened on bimanual palpation of the styloid through the tonsillar bed. They may be relieved by infiltration of lidocaine into the tonsillar bed. Because of the proximity of several large vascular structures in this area this procedure should not be considered to be risk free.

Imaging is important and is diagnostic. Visualizing the styloid process on a CT scan with 3D reconstruction is the suggested imaging technique. The enlarged styloid may be visible on an orthopantogram or a lateral soft tissue X ray of the neck.

== Treatment ==
Treatment for Eagle syndrome varies by case severity. Conservative methods typically include physiotherapy, long-acting anesthetics, and anti-inflammatory drugs. More specifically NSAIDs, anticonvulsants, and antidepressants. NSAIDs are beneficial for inflammatory symptoms, while other medications target nerve-related pain.

Studies have shown that consistent physical therapy can significantly reduce pain and improve quality of life for patients with Eagle Syndrome. Physical therapy aims to reduce overall pain by relaxing muscles around the calcified styloid ligament. Techniques may include manual therapy, stretching exercises, and specific movements to alleviate tension and improve muscle function.

=== Surgical treatments ===
A partial styloidectomy is the preferred approach. Repair of a damaged carotid artery is essential in order to prevent further neurological complications. Regrowth of the stylohyoid process and relapse being a common occurrence is debatable. Medical management may include the use of pain and anti-inflammatory medications, antidepressants, and/or corticosteroids. The overall success rate for treatment (medical or surgical) is about 80%.

== Epidemiology ==
Approximately 4% of the general population have an elongated styloid process, and of these about 4% give rise to the symptoms of Eagle syndrome. Therefore, the incidence of stylohyoid syndrome may be about 0.16%. Studies have reported the incidence of styloid elongation in patients presenting with orthofacial pain to be as high as 54%.

Patients with this syndrome tend to be between 30 and 50 years of age, but it has been recorded in teenagers and in patients > 75 years old. It is more common in women, with a male:female ratio ~ 1:3.

== See also ==
- Ehlers–Danlos syndrome
- Marfan syndrome
- Styloidogenic jugular venous compression syndrome
