= PRX =

PRX may refer to:

- Pressure reactivity index, a medical tool for monitoring patients with acute brain injuries
- PRX (telephony), a telephone switching platform developed by Philips
- Public Radio Exchange, a web-based public-radio distribution company
- PRX (gene), periactin (PRX is the current official symbol)
- Peroxiredoxins, a family of enzymes (PRX is an older alias symbol)
- Physical Review X, a scientific journal published by the American Physical Society
- PRX, the IATA airport code for Cox Field Airport in Paris, Texas, United States
- A file extension for PlayStation Portable firmware
- Paper Rex, a Valorant E-sports team
