= Pressure reactivity index =

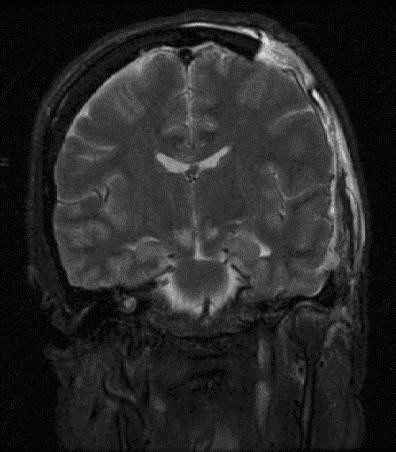
Traumatic brain injury can cause dangerously raised intracranial pressure.

Pressure reactivity index or PRx is a tool for monitoring cerebral autoregulation in the intensive care setting for patients with severe traumatic brain injury or subarachnoid haemorrhage, in order to guide therapy to protect the brain from dangerously high or low cerebral blood flow.

PRx uses mathematical algorithms to calculate the correlation between arterial blood pressure and intracranial pressure. PRx assesses for correlations at low frequencies, below 0.1 Hz, and thus ignores individual pulses while capturing the effects of respiratory-driven variation in arterial pressure as well as other longer-acting stimuli.

Under normal conditions, cerebral autoregulation ensures that cerebral blood flow is unchanged despite variations in blood pressure by regulating the cerebral vessels. For example, if the blood pressure increases, the cerebral vessels vasoconstrict to keep cerebral blood flow normal, whereas a decrease in blood pressure would lead to vasodilation of the cerebral vessels to increase blood flow. The cerebrovascular reactions to changes in blood pressure generates a corresponding effect on the intracranial pressure. When the blood pressure increases and the vessels vasoconstrict, the cerebral blood volume is reduced. According to the Monro-Kellie doctrine, less cerebral blood volume leads to a reduction in the intracranial pressure. If the blood pressure instead would decrease, the cerebral vessels would vasodilatate, with a resulting increase in cerebral blood volume.

== Definition ==
In the original article, it is stated that "Time-averaged values of ICP, ABP, CPP, (CPP = MAP - ICP), and the middle cerebral artery blood FV were calculated using waveform time integration (average values of 256 consecutive samples) for 5-second intervals. Linear (Pearson's) moving correlation coefficients between 40 past consecutive 5-second averages of ICP and ABP, designated as the PRx, were computed. Computations were repeated with a moving window every 5 seconds." Later research has shown that analysis of lower frequency data (minute-by-minute) can have similar results in autoregulation monitoring.

In the 20 year follow up article, they state "we programmed our computers, running ICM (intensive care monitor) software, to calculate a moving correlation coefficient from 30 consecutive 10-s averages of ICP and ABP waveforms. We called this the PRx index (pressure reactivity index)". This is also the definition provided on the homepage promoting ICM+, a software that can calculate PRx.

In 2022 a retrospective analysis identified five types of artifacts in terms of pressure reactivity index: "rectangular, fast impulse, isoline drift, saw tooth, and constant ICP value," and concluded that the effects of these artifacts on the PRx index are variable.

== PRx and outcome prediction ==
A high PRx indicating disturbed pressure autoregulation predicts poor outcome in traumatic brain injury.

== PRx as a treatment target ==
PRx varies with the concurrent cerebral perfusion pressure (CPP) in a U-shaped way. It has been suggested that the CPP with the lowest PRx is optimal (CPPopt) and CPP-values close to optimal have been associated with better outcome. CPP values above CPPopt are believed to cause hyperemia, i.e. to high cerebral blood flow that may cause cerebral edema and intracranial hypertension, whereas CPP values below CPPopt are believed to cause hypoperfusion and ischemia resulting in tissue damage.

== See also ==
- Cerebral autoregulation
- Intracranial pressure
- Cushing's triad
