= Brain Trauma Foundation =

The Brain Trauma Foundation (BTF) was founded in 1986 to develop research on traumatic brain injury (TBI). Since its formation the foundation's mission has expanded to improving the outcome of TBI patients nationwide through working to implement evidence-based guidelines for prehospital and in-hospital care, quality-improvement programs, and coordinating educational programs for medical professionals.

== TBI Guidelines ==
The Brain Trauma Foundation has developed the Guidelines for the Management of Severe Traumatic Brain Injury, first published in 1995, and revised periodically, most recently in 2016. It also developed the Guidelines for the Management of Pediatric Severe Traumatic Brain Injury, with the third edition published in 2019. The foundation has also developed companion guidelines for prehospital management of TBI, early indicators and prognosis of severe TBI, surgical management of TBI, and field management for combat medics. The guidelines seek to create uniformity in TBI care all over the world.

An independent analysis of the effect of the Brain Trauma Foundation's (BTF) guidelines on traumatic brain injury (TBI) outcome and cost savings by the Centers for Disease Control and Prevention (CDC) found that if the BTF guidelines were used more routinely, there would be a 50% decrease in deaths, improved quality of life and a savings of $262 million in annual medical costs, $43 million in annual rehabilitation costs and a lifetime societal cost of $3.84 billion.

The guidelines have been endorsed by the American Association of Neurological Surgeons, the World Health Organization Neurotrauma Committee, and the New York State Department of Health. The guidelines have been distributed to all neurosurgeons in the United States. The guidelines provide medical personnel a protocol which has been proven to improve the survival and outcomes of TBI patients and has been shown to reduce rates of mortality.

== Intracranial pressure (ICP) monitoring ==
One of the main facets of the guidelines is the recommendation to monitor intracranial pressure in treating severe TBI patients. This process is called ICP Monitoring.
