= Copper beaten skull =

Medical phenomenon

Copper beaten skull is a phenomenon wherein intense intracranial pressure disfigures the internal surface of the skull. The name comes from the fact that the inner skull has the appearance of having been beaten with a ball-peen hammer, such as is often used by coppersmiths. The condition is most common in children with hydrocephalus and is due to abnormal collagen development and ossification.
