= Cerebral perfusion pressure =

Net pressure gradient causing cerebral blood flow to the brain

Cerebral perfusion pressure (CPP) is the net pressure gradient causing cerebral blood flow to the brain (brain perfusion). It must be maintained within narrow limits because too little pressure could cause brain tissue to become ischemic (having inadequate blood flow), and too much could raise intracranial pressure (ICP).

== Definitions ==
The cranium encloses a fixed-volume space that holds three components: blood, cerebrospinal fluid (CSF), and very soft tissue (the brain). While both the blood and CSF have poor compression capacity, the brain is easily compressible.

Every increase of ICP can cause a change in tissue perfusion and an increase in stroke events.

=== From resistance ===
CPP can be defined as the pressure gradient causing cerebral blood flow (CBF) such that

$$CBF = CPP/CVR$$

where:

CVR is cerebrovascular resistance

=== By intracranial pressure ===
An alternative definition of CPP is:

$$CPP=MAP-ICP$$

where:

MAP is mean arterial pressure
ICP is intracranial pressure
JVP is jugular venous pressure

This definition may be more appropriate if considering the circulatory system in the brain as a Starling resistor, where an external pressure (in this case, the intracranial pressure) causes decreased blood flow through the vessels. In this sense, more specifically, the cerebral perfusion pressure can be defined as either:

$CPP = MAP - ICP$ (if ICP is higher than JVP)

or

$CPP = MAP - JVP$ (if JVP is higher than ICP).

Physiologically, increased intracranial pressure (ICP) causes decreased blood perfusion of brain cells by mainly two mechanisms:

- Increased ICP constitutes an increased interstitial hydrostatic pressure that, in turn, causes a decreased driving force for capillary filtration from intracerebral blood vessels.
- Increased ICP compresses cerebral arteries, causing increased cerebrovascular resistance (CVR).

FLOW Ranging from $^{20\,\textrm{mL}}/_{100\,\textrm{g}{\cdot}\textrm{min}}$ in white matter to $^{70\,\textrm{mL}}/_{100\,\textrm{g}{\cdot}\textrm{min}}$ in grey matter.

== Autoregulation ==
Under normal circumstances a MAP between 60 and 160 mmHg and ICP about 10 mmHg (CPP of 50-150 mmHg) sufficient blood flow can be maintained with autoregulation. Although the classic 'autoregulation curve' suggests that CBF is fully stable between these blood pressure values (known also as the limits of autoregulation), in practice spontaneous fluctuations can occur.

Outside of the limits of autoregulation, raising MAP raises CBF and raising ICP lowers it (this is one reason that increasing ICP in traumatic brain injury is potentially deadly). In trauma some recommend CPP not go below 70 mmHg. Recommendations in children is at least 60 mmHg.

Within the autoregulatory range, as CPP falls there is, within seconds, vasodilation of the cerebral resistance vessels, a fall in cerebrovascular resistance and a rise in cerebral-blood volume (CBV), and therefore CBF will return to baseline value within seconds (see as ref. Aaslid, Lindegaard, Sorteberg, and Nornes 1989: http://stroke.ahajournals.org/cgi/reprint/20/1/45.pdf). These adaptations to rapid changes in blood pressure (in contrast with changes that occur over periods of hours or days) are known as dynamic cerebral autoregulation.
