= Cerebral autoregulation =

Cerebral autoregulation is a process in mammals that aims to maintain adequate and stable cerebral blood flow. While most systems of the body show some degree of autoregulation, the brain is very sensitive to over- and underperfusion. Cerebral autoregulation plays an important role in maintaining an appropriate blood flow to that region. Brain perfusion is essential for life, since the brain has a high metabolic demand. By means of cerebral autoregulation, the body is able to deliver sufficient blood containing oxygen and nutrients to the brain tissue for this metabolic need, and remove CO_{2} and other waste products.

Cerebral autoregulation refers to the physiological mechanisms that maintain blood flow at an appropriate level during changes in blood pressure. However, cerebral autoregulation is often interpreted as encompassing the wider field of cerebral blood flow regulation due to the important influences of arterial carbon dioxide levels, cerebral metabolic rate, neural activation, activity of the sympathetic nervous system, posture, as well as other physiological variables, . This field includes areas such as CO_{2} reactivity, neurovascular coupling and other aspects of cerebral haemodynamics.

This regulation of cerebral blood flow is achieved primarily by small arteries, arterioles, which either dilate or contract under the influence of multiple complex physiological control systems. Impairment of these systems may occur e.g. following stroke, trauma or anaesthesia, in premature babies and has been implicated in the development of subsequent brain injury. The non-invasive measurement of relevant physiological signals like cerebral blood flow, intracranial pressure, blood pressure, CO_{2} levels, cerebral oxygen consumption, etc. is challenging. Even more so is the subsequent assessment of the control systems. Much remains unknown about the physiology of blood flow control and the best clinical interventions to optimize patient outcome.

== Physiological mechanisms ==
Three different mechanisms are thought to contribute to the process of cerebral autoregulation. These are metabolic, myogenic and neurogenic.

=== Metabolic regulation ===
Metabolic regulation is driven by the difference between cerebral metabolism (demand) and oxygen delivery through cerebral blood flow (supply) and acts by means of a vasoactive substance. In principle, this is a negative feedback control system that seeks to balance blood flow to its demand.

=== Myogenic regulation ===
The effect of transmural blood pressure changes is directly detected by the vascular smooth muscle in arterioles, probably via a stress sensing mechanism. Then, the calibers are adjusted accordingly to keep blood flow constant.

=== Neurogenic regulation ===
The vascular smooth muscle actuators in the resistance arterioles are controlled via sympathetic innervation, receiving the input from the appropriate brainstem autonomous control center. Nitric oxide released by parasympathetic fibers may also play a role.

== Assessment of cerebral autoregulation ==
In order to assess cerebral autoregulation one must at least continuously measure arterial blood pressure and cerebral blood flow. Because CO_{2} levels are of great influence to cerebral autoregulation it is recommended to also continuously measure CO_{2}.

=== Measuring arterial blood pressure ===
Arterial blood pressure can be measured invasively using an arterial line. However, noninvasive finger arterial pressure can also be measured using a volume clamp technique. This technique uses a combination of an inflatable finger cuff and an infrared plethysmograph.

=== Measuring cerebral blood flow ===
Cerebral blood flow can be quantified in various ways of which three noninvasive means are currently much used. These are Transcranial Doppler sonography, Magnetic Resonance Imaging and Near Infrared Spectroscopy.

=== Quantification of cerebral autoregulation ===
The quantification of cerebral autoregulation always involves variation seen in cerebral blood flow in relation to changes in blood pressure. This blood pressure variation can either be evoked or spontaneous. Evoked blood pressure changes can be the result of:

- releasing leg cuffs that were inflated above systolic pressure
- breathing at a fixed rate
- performing a Valsalva maneuver
- performing squat-stand or sit-stand maneuvers
- lower body negative pressure
- pharmaceutical methods to raise or lower blood pressure

The quantification depends on the experimental setup and can involve methods such as regression, cross-correlation, transfer function analysis or fitting mathematical models.

Measuring and understanding cerebral autoregulation remains a difficult task. Despite clinical interest and much research effort, benefit to patients has so far been limited.

== See also ==
- Autoregulation
