= Intracranial pressure =

Pressure exerted by fluids inside the skull and on the brain

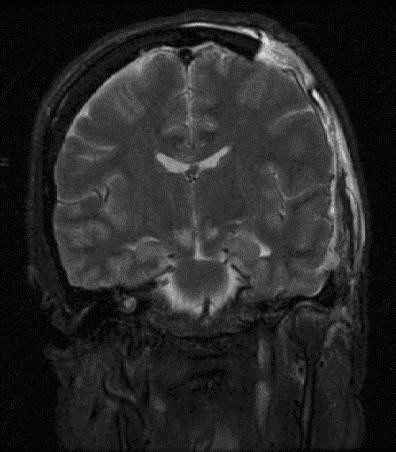
- Severely high ICP can cause the brain to herniate.
- Specialty: Neurosurgery, Neurology
- Types: Increased, normal, decreased

Intracranial pressure (ICP) is the pressure exerted by fluids such as cerebrospinal fluid (CSF) inside the skull and on the brain tissue. ICP is measured in millimeters of mercury (mmHg) and at rest, is normally 7–15 mmHg for a supine adult. This equals to 9–20 cmH_{2}O, which is a common scale used in lumbar punctures. The body has various mechanisms by which it keeps the ICP stable, with CSF pressures varying by about 1 mmHg in normal adults through shifts in production and absorption of CSF.

Changes in ICP are attributed to volume changes in one or more of the constituents contained in the cranium. CSF pressure has been shown to be influenced by abrupt changes in intrathoracic pressure during coughing (which is induced by contraction of the diaphragm and abdominal wall muscles, the latter of which also increases intra-abdominal pressure), the valsalva maneuver, and communication with the vasculature (venous and arterial systems).

Intracranial hypertension (IH), also called increased ICP (IICP) or raised intracranial pressure (RICP), refers to elevated pressure in the cranium. 20–25 mmHg is the upper limit of normal at which treatment is necessary, though it is common to use 15 mmHg as the threshold for beginning treatment.

== Signs and symptoms ==
In general, symptoms and signs that suggest a rise in ICP include headache, vomiting without nausea, ocular palsies, altered level of consciousness, back pain and papilledema. If papilledema is protracted, it may lead to visual disturbances, optic atrophy, and eventually blindness. The headache is classically a morning headache that may wake the person up. The brain is relatively poorly supplied by oxygen as a result of mild hypoventilation during the sleeping hours leading to hypercapnia and vasodilation. Cerebral edema may worsen during the night due to the lying position. The headache is worse on coughing, sneezing, or bending, and progressively worsens over time. There may also be personality or behavioral changes.In addition to the above, if mass effect is present with resulting displacement of brain tissue, additional signs may include pupillary dilatation, abducens palsies, and Cushing's triad. Cushing's triad involves an increased systolic blood pressure, a widened pulse pressure, bradycardia, and an abnormal respiratory pattern. In children, a low heart rate is especially suggestive of high ICP.

Intracranial hypertension syndrome is characterized by an elevated ICP, papilledema, and headache with occasional abducens nerve paresis, absence of a space-occupying lesion or ventricular enlargement, and normal cerebrospinal fluid chemical and hematological constituents.Irregular respirations occur when injury to parts of the brain interfere with the respiratory drive. Biot's respiration, in which breathing is rapid for a period and then absent for a period, occurs because of injury to the cerebral hemispheres or diencephalon. Hyperventilation can occur when the brain stem or tegmentum is damaged.As a rule, patients with normal blood pressure retain normal alertness with ICP of 25–40 mmHg (unless tissue shifts at the same time). Only when ICP exceeds 40–50 mmHg does CPP and cerebral perfusion decrease to a level that often causes loss of consciousness. Any further elevations may lead to brain infarction and brain death.

In infants and small children, the effects of ICP differ because their cranial sutures have not closed. In infants, the fontanels (soft spots on the head where the skull bones have not yet fused) bulge when ICP gets too high. ICP correlates with intraocular pressure (IOP) but seems to lack the accuracy necessary for close management of intracranial pressure in the acute post-traumatic period.

Papilledema (swelling of the optic disc) can be a reliable sign of elevated ICP. Unlike other conditions that may result in the swelling of the optic disc, it is in the case of papilledema that vision may go largely unaffected.

== Cause ==
=== Increased ICP ===
Causes of increased intracranial pressure can be classified by the mechanism in which ICP is increased:

- Mass effect such as brain tumor, infarction with edema, contusions, subdural or epidural hematoma, or abscesses all tend to deform the adjacent brain.
- Generalized brain swelling can occur in ischemic-anoxia states, acute liver failure, hypertensive encephalopathy, hypercarbia (hypercapnia), and Reye hepatocerebral syndrome. These conditions tend to decrease the cerebral perfusion pressure but with minimal tissue shifts.
- Increase in venous pressure can be due to venous sinus thrombosis, heart failure, or obstruction of superior mediastinal or jugular veins.
- Obstruction to CSF flow and/or absorption can occur in hydrocephalus (blockage in ventricles or subarachnoid space at base of brain, e.g., by Arnold–Chiari malformation), extensive meningeal disease (e.g., infection, carcinoma, granuloma, or hemorrhage), or obstruction in cerebral convexities and superior sagittal sinus (decreased absorption).
- Increased CSF production can occur in meningitis, subarachnoid hemorrhage, or choroid plexus tumor.
- Idiopathic or unknown cause (idiopathic intracranial hypertension, a common cause in otherwise well people especially younger women)
- Craniosynostosis

One of the most damaging aspects of brain trauma and other conditions, directly correlated with poor outcome, is an elevated intracranial pressure. ICP is very likely to cause severe harm if it rises too high. Very high intracranial pressures are usually fatal if prolonged, but children can tolerate higher pressures for longer periods. An increase in pressure, most commonly due to head injury leading to intracranial hematoma or cerebral edema, can crush brain tissue, shift brain structures, contribute to hydrocephalus, cause brain herniation, and restrict blood supply to the brain. It is a cause of reflex bradycardia.

==== Drug-induced intracranial hypertension ====
Drug-induced intracranial hypertension (DIIH) or medication-induced intracranial hypertension is a condition of higher than normal intracranial pressure with the main cause being a drug. This condition is similar to idiopathic intracranial hypertension, however the etiology in this instance is a drug. The most frequent symptoms are headaches, pulsatile tinnitus, diplopia, and impairment of visual acuity. The only observable signs of the condition may be papilledema and bilateral sixth cranial nerve (abducens) palsies.

=== Low ICP ===
Spontaneous intracranial hypotension may occur as a result of an occult leak of CSF at the level of the spine, into another body cavity. More commonly, decreased ICP is the result of lumbar puncture or other medical procedure involving the spinal cord. Various medical imaging technologies exist to assist in identifying the cause of decreased ICP. Often, the syndrome is self-limiting, especially if it is the result of a medical procedure.

If persistent intracranial hypotension is the result of a lumbar puncture, a blood patch may be applied to seal the site of CSF leakage. Various medical treatments have been proposed; only the intravenous administration of caffeine and theophylline has shown to be particularly useful.

The International Classification of Headache Disorders (ICHD) Third Edition diagnostic criteria for spontaneous intracranial hypotension includes any headache attributed to low CSF pressure (low CSF opening pressure) or CSF leakage (evidence of CSF leakage on imaging). Further, the headache must have a temporal relation to the low CSF pressure or leakage and the headache cannot be better explained by another ICHD diagnosis. The final criteria is that in the rare cases of spontaneous intracranial hypotension with no headache present, the neurologic symptoms that are present must be attributable to low CSF or explained by the diagnosis of spontaneous intracranial hypotension.

== Pathophysiology ==
Cerebral perfusion pressure (CPP), the pressure of blood flowing to the brain, is normally fairly constant due to autoregulation, but for abnormal mean arterial pressure (MAP) or abnormal ICP the cerebral perfusion pressure is calculated by subtracting the intracranial pressure from the mean arterial pressure: CPP = MAP − ICP . One of the main dangers of increased ICP is that it can cause ischemia by decreasing CPP. Once the ICP approaches the level of the mean systemic pressure, cerebral perfusion falls. The body's response to a fall in CPP is to raise systemic blood pressure and dilate cerebral blood vessels. This results in increased cerebral blood volume, which increases ICP, lowering CPP further and causing a vicious cycle. This results in widespread reduction in cerebral flow and perfusion, eventually leading to ischemia and brain infarction. Increased blood pressure can also make intracranial hemorrhages bleed faster, also increasing ICP.

Severely raised ICP, if caused by a unilateral space-occupying lesion (e.g. a hematoma) can result in midline shift, a dangerous sequela in which the brain moves toward one side as the result of massive swelling in a cerebral hemisphere. Midline shift can compress the ventricles and lead to hydrocephalus.

=== Monro–Kellie hypothesis ===
The pressure–volume relationship between ICP, volume of CSF, blood, and brain tissue, and cerebral perfusion pressure (CPP) is known as the Monro–Kellie doctrine or hypothesis.The Monro–Kellie hypothesis states that the cranial compartment is inelastic and that the volume inside the cranium is fixed. The cranium and its constituents (blood, CSF, and brain tissue) create a state of volume equilibrium, such that any increase in volume of one of the cranial constituents must be compensated by a decrease in volume of another. *This concept only applies to adults, as the presence of fontanelles and open suture lines in infants that have not yet fused means there is potential for a change in size and intracranial volume.

The principal buffers for increased volumes include CSF and, to a lesser extent, blood volume. These buffers respond to increases in volume of the remaining intracranial constituents. For example, an increase in lesion volume (e.g., epidural hematoma) will be compensated by the downward displacement of CSF and venous blood. Additionally, there is some evidence that brain tissue itself may provide an additional buffer for elevated ICP in circumstances of acute intracranial mass effect via cell volume regulation.The Monro–Kellie hypothesis is named after Edinburgh doctors Alexander Monro and George Kellie.

== Diagnosis ==
The most definitive way of measuring the intracranial pressure is with transducers placed within the brain. A catheter can be surgically inserted into one of the brain's lateral ventricles and can be used to drain CSF (cerebrospinal fluid) in order to decrease ICPs. This type of drain is known as an external ventricular drain (EVD). This is rarely required outside brain injury and brain surgery settings.

In situations when only small amounts of CSF are to be drained to reduce ICP's (e.g. in idiopathic intracranial hypertension), drainage of CSF via lumbar puncture can be used as a treatment. Non-invasive measurement of intracranial pressure is being studied.

== Treatment ==
The treatment for elevated ICP depends on the cause. In addition to management of the underlying causes, major considerations in acute treatment of increased ICP relates to the management of stroke and cerebral trauma.

For long-term or chronic forms of raised ICP, especially idiopathic intracranial hypertension (IIH), a specific type of diuretic medication (acetazolamide) is used. In cases of confirmed brain neoplasm, dexamethasone is given to decrease ICP. Although the exact mechanism is unknown, current research shows that dexamethasone is capable of decreasing peritumoral water content and local tissue pressure to decrease ICP.

=== Ventilation ===
In people who have high ICP due to an acute injury, it is particularly important to ensure adequate airway, breathing, and oxygenation. Inadequate blood oxygen levels (hypoxia) or excessively high carbon dioxide levels (hypercapnia) cause cerebral blood vessels to dilate, increasing the flow of blood to the brain and causing the ICP to rise. Inadequate oxygenation also forces brain cells to produce energy using anaerobic metabolism, which produces lactic acid and lowers pH, also dilating blood vessels and exacerbating the problem. Conversely, blood vessels constrict when carbon dioxide levels are below normal, so hyperventilating a person with a ventilator or bag valve mask can temporarily reduce ICP. Hyperventilation was formerly a part of the standard treatment of traumatic brain injuries, but the induced constriction of blood vessels limits blood flow to the brain at a time when the brain may already be ischemic—hence it is no longer widely used. Furthermore, the brain adjusts to the new level of carbon dioxide after 48 to 72 hours of hyperventilation, which could cause the vessels to rapidly dilate if carbon-dioxide levels were returned to normal too quickly. Hyperventilation is still used if ICP is resistant to other methods of control, or there are signs of brain herniation, because the damage herniation can cause is so severe that it may be worthwhile to constrict blood vessels even if doing so reduces blood flow. ICP can also be lowered by raising the head of the bed, improving venous drainage. A side effect of this is that it could lower pressure of blood to the head, resulting in a reduced and possibly inadequate blood supply to the brain. Venous drainage may also be impeded by external factors such as hard collars to immobilize the neck in trauma patients, and this may also increase the ICP. Sandbags may be used to further limit neck movement.

=== Medication ===
In the hospital, the blood pressure can be increased in order to increase CPP, increase perfusion, oxygenate tissues, remove wastes, and thereby lessen swelling. Since hypertension is the body's way of forcing blood into the brain, medical professionals do not normally interfere with it when it is found in a person with a head injury. When it is necessary to decrease cerebral blood flow, MAP can be lowered using common antihypertensive agents such as calcium channel blockers.

If there is an intact blood–brain barrier, osmotherapy (mannitol or hypertonic saline) may be used to decrease ICP.It is unclear whether mannitol or hypertonic saline is superior, or if they improve outcomes.

Struggling, restlessness, and seizures can increase metabolic demands and oxygen consumption, as well as increasing blood pressure. Analgesia and sedation are used to reduce agitation and metabolic needs of the brain, but these medications may cause low blood pressure and other side effects. Thus if full sedation alone is ineffective, people may be paralyzed with drugs such as atracurium. Paralysis allows the cerebral veins to drain more easily, but can mask signs of seizures, and the drugs can have other harmful effects. Paralysing drugs are only introduced if patients are fully sedated (this is essentially the same as a general anaesthetic)

=== Surgery ===
Craniotomies are holes drilled in the skull with the help of cranial drills to remove intracranial hematomas or relieve pressure from parts of the brain. As raised ICP's may be caused by the presence of a mass, removal of this via craniotomy will decrease raised ICP's.

A drastic treatment for increased ICP is decompressive craniectomy, in which a part of the skull is removed and the dura mater is expanded to allow the brain to swell without crushing it or causing herniation. The section of bone removed, known as a bone flap, can be stored in the patient's abdomen and resited back to complete the skull once the acute cause of raised ICP's has resolved. Alternatively a synthetic material may be used to replace the removed bone section (see cranioplasty)

== See also ==
- Brain Trauma Foundation
- Copper beaten skull
- Pressure reactivity index (PRx)
