= Cranial venous outflow obstruction =

- Other names: Intracranial venous congestion
- Main veins and sinuses of the human brain
- Specialty: Neurology
- Diagnostic method: Medical imaging

Cranial venous outflow obstruction, also referred to as impaired cranial venous outflow, impaired cerebral venous outflow, cerebral venous impairment is a vascular disorder that involves the impairment of venous drainage from the cerebral veins of the human brain.

The cause of cranial venous outflow obstruction is not fully understood. It is believed to be associated with various factors including anatomical abnormalities, thrombosis, posture, and increased intracranial pressure.

The obstruction can occur in any part of the venous system involved in draining blood from the brain, like vertebral venous system (VVS) or cerebral venous sinus (CVS), but it is most commonly seen in the dural venous sinuses.

== Signs and symptoms ==
Impaired cranial venous outflow can lead to increased venous pressure, decreased cerebrospinal fluid (CSF) absorption, brain cortex hypoperfusion, brain edema, blood–brain barrier (BBB) disruption, inflammatory reactions, hemorrhagic complications, and increased intracranial pressure. Which can result in a variety of neurological symptoms, such as pseudotumor cerebri, chronic fatigue syndrome, different types of headaches, visual disturbances, pulsatile tinnitus and various neurodegenerative diseases.

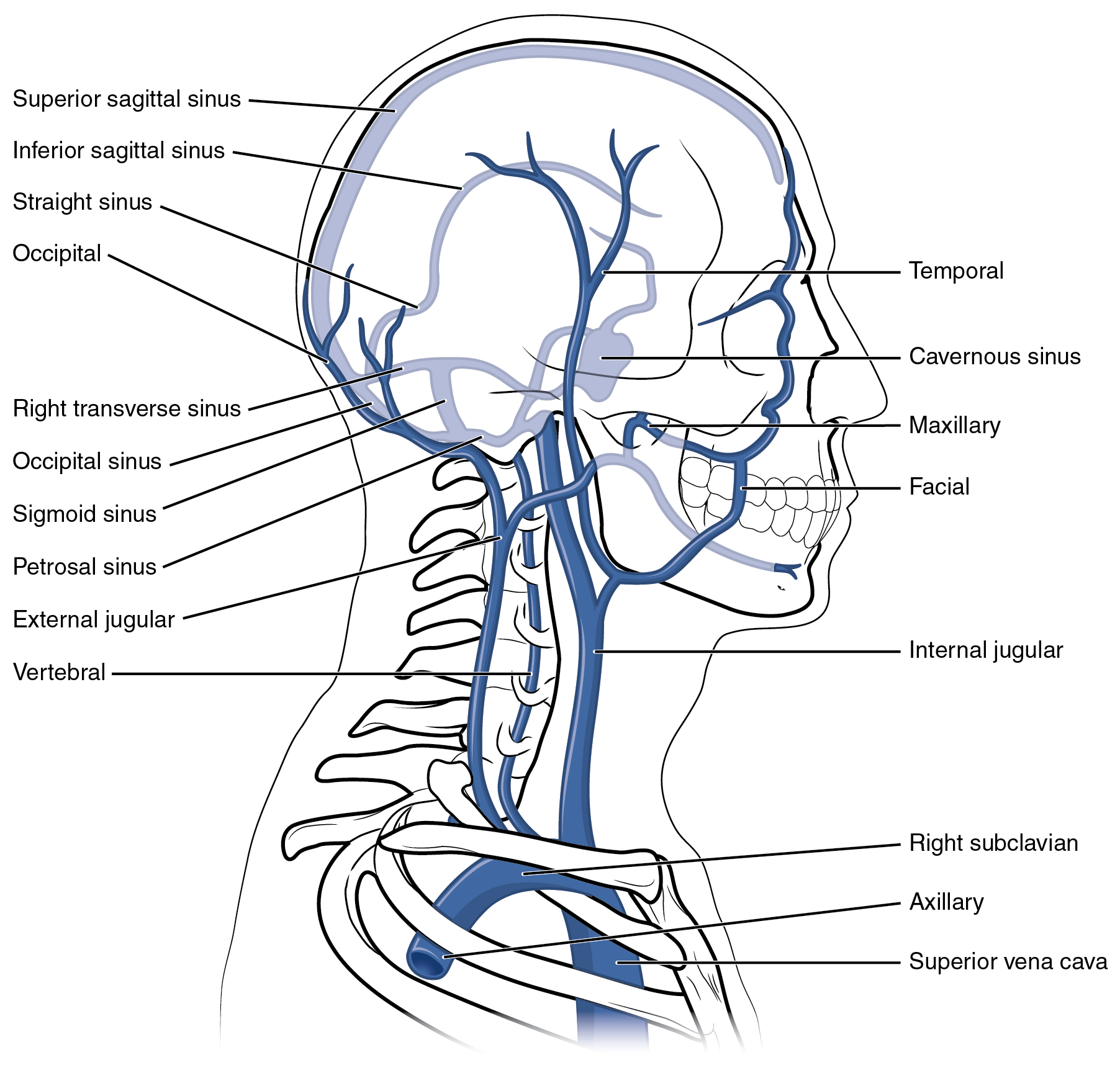
Head and Neck Veins

== Pathophysiology ==
The pathophysiology of cranial venous outflow obstruction involves the disruption of normal venous drainage from the brain. Cerebral veins play a crucial role in draining brain interstitial fluid (ISF), and their significance has been linked in various neurological conditions. It can be caused by extrinsic or intrinsic anomalies.

=== Extrinsic ===
Extrinsic anomalies are structural changes near the Internal Jugular Vein (IJV) that can cause venous outflow obstruction. These changes can be due to bone pressure, artery pressure, enlarged lymph nodes, or an enlarged thyroid. These factors can squeeze the vein wall and block the blood flow. This blockage can range from a local narrowing (stenosis) to a complete blockage (occlusion).

Different parts of the IJV can be affected by different factors. The upper part of the IJV is often squeezed by the side parts of the neck bones at the vertebral C1 segment and by the styloid processes. The middle and lower parts of the IJV are more often squeezed by the nearby carotid artery, lymph nodes, and unusual muscles. Among all these factors, bone pressure is the most common, causing about 40% of extrinsic anomalies. A recent study showed that 41.9% of IJV narrowing in a Chinese group was due to external pressure.

=== Intrinsic ===
Intrinsic anomalies are changes within the IJV itself. These can include blood clots (thrombi), abnormalities in the vessel wall, and malformed venous valves. IJV thrombosis is rare and has only been mentioned in a few case reports. Defects inside the vein (flaps, webs, septa, membranes, and malformed valves) can hinder normal blood flow from the brain. This can result in changes in blood flow, including backflow (reflux), reduced flow, or no flow entirely. Doppler and intravascular ultrasound are effective tools for seeing malformed valves. There are many types of malformed valves, including fused, elongated, ectopic, accessory leaflet-containing, inverted, and double valves.

== Management ==
Management of cranial venous outflow obstruction involves treating the underlying cause, if identifiable, and managing the symptoms. This can include medication to reduce intracranial pressure, anticoagulation therapy to prevent thrombosis, and in some cases, surgical intervention to restore normal venous drainage.

== Epidemiology ==
The epidemiology of cranial venous outflow obstruction is not well-studied, and the condition is likely underdiagnosed due to the nonspecific nature of its symptoms. However, it is known to affect individuals of all ages, with a higher prevalence in females and individuals with anatomical venous disorders (varicose veins), certain risk factors such as obesity and thrombophilic disorders and sedentary lifestyle.

== Types ==
=== Styloidogenic jugular venous compression syndrome ===
Styloidogenic jugular venous compression syndrome (SJVCS) shares symptoms with idiopathic intracranial hypertension (IIH). Patients with SJVCS experience compression of venous outflow on both sides due to bone structures. It occurs due to compression of the internal jugular vein (IJV) between the C1 vertebrae transverse process and the temporal styloid process. Treatments like venous stenting and styloidectomy have shown positive results.

== Diagnostics ==
Diagnostics of this pathology might include advanced MR venography, direct microcatheter venography with manometry, 3D catheter angiographic studies, three-dimensional rotational venography (3D-RV), cone-beam rotational angiography (3D-RA), also CT venography or MRI scans with contrast with would potentially show obstruction.

== See also ==
- Myalgic encephalomyelitis/chronic fatigue syndrome
- Chronic cerebrospinal venous insufficiency controversy
