= Tabulosphenoid =

Compound bone in the skull of worm lizards

Skull of Blanus mendezi, with tabulosphenoid shown in dark purple.

The tabulosphenoid is a composite bone of the skull in amphisbaenians (worm lizards). It forms the floor of the middle part of the braincase in this clade. It is partly homologous to the orbitosphenoid, an endochondral bone, but also includes a component of dermal bone.

== Anatomy ==
The tabulophenoid forms the floor of the front of the braincase; it articulates posteriorly with the parabasisphenoid, ventrally with the palatines, dorsally with the parietal, and anteriorly with the ventral process of the frontals (which in amphisbaenians form a tube enclosing the anterior portion of the brain). It forms the ventromedial border of the orbit. In the genera Dalophia and Monopeltis, the tabulosphenoid fuses (sometimes incompletely) with the parietal and frontals.

In the embryo, the tabulosphenoid originally develops as paired elements; later in ontogeny, however, the elements generally fuse into a single midline element. This fusion may be a synapomorphy uniting amphisbaenians with the fossil Sineoamphisbaenia, often considered the closest relative of the clade. The fossil taxon Protorhineura hatcherii is an exception, having unfused tabulosphenoids.

Previously, the element had been referred to as the orbitosphenoid, presphenoid, or laterosphenoid. However, a 1983 paper demonstrated that while part of the element ossifies endochondrally from the trabeculae and planum supraseptale, another part ossifies as membrane and is thus dermal bone, although the element ossifies deep in the skull, away from the skin. A 1999 paper suggested the replacement name tabulosphenoid to refer to the fusion of the orbitosphenoid with the unknown dermal element. The name refers to the tabular shape of the element, and is not meant to suggest a relationship to the tabular bone.

A 2012 paper suggested the presence of the ophidiosphenoid in amphisbaenians. If so, the presence of the element in amphisbaenians and snakes would represent convergent evolution.

== See also ==
- Orbitosphenoid
- Ophidiosphenoid
- Laterosphenoid
