= Dermatocranium =

Portion of the cranium that is composed of dermal bone

The dermatocranium is the portion of the vertebrate skull that is composed of dermal bone, as opposed to the chondrocranium and splanchnocranium, which are composed of endochondral bone. Bones of the dermatocranium originate from integumentary bony armour in the earliest fishes, only later fusing to the endochondral skull bones.

The dermatocranium comprises the skull roof, the facial skeleton, and—in fishes—the opercular bones. During the early evolution of tetrapods, a number of the bones in the posterior skull separated to become the dermal portions of the shoulder girdle.

== Osteichthyes ==
The dermatocranium of osteichthyans is divided into the following series. Few if any taxa have every bone of the dermatocranium; some represent bones present ancestrally in osteichthyans but later lost in various groups, while others represent neomorphs only present in some groups.

=== Facial series ===
Bones of the facial series make up the snout.

- Premaxilla/Incisive
- Maxilla
- Nasal
- Internasal
- Medial rostral
- Intermediate rostral
- Lateral rostral (Septomaxilla)
- Tectals
- Postrostrals
- Dermal sphenethmoid

=== Orbital series ===
Bones of the orbital series encircle and define the orbit.

- Lacrimal
- Prefrontal
- Postfrontal
- Postorbital
- Jugal (Zygomatic)
- Palpebral/Supraorbitals (in some taxa)

=== Temporal series ===
Bones of the temporal series make up the region behind the orbit (i.e., the temple). These bones frequently encircle the temporal fenestrae, if present.

- Intertemporal (Dermosphenotic)
- Supratemporal
- Tabular
- Squamosal
- Quadratojugal
- Ophidiosphenoid

=== Vault series ===
Also known as roofing bones, the vault series forms the dorsal surface of the braincase. This area also encloses the parietal eye, if present.

- Frontal
- Parietal
- Postparietal/Dermosupraoccipital
- Lateral extrascapular
- Medial extrascapular

=== Palatal series ===
The palatal series encloses most of the roof of the mouth.

- Vomer
- Palatine/Dermopalatine
- Ectopterygoid
- Entopterygoid/Mesopterygoid
- Pterygoid
- Parasphenoid
- Predermopalatine

=== Mandibular series ===
The bones of the mandibular series enclose Meckel's cartilage and form most of the lower jaw. In mammals, the angular becomes part of the structure of the ear.

- Dentary
- Infradentary
- Splenial
- Presplenial
- Postsplenial
- Angular/Ectotympanic
- Angulosplenial
- Surangular
- Prearticular
- Coronoid
- Precoronoid
- Coronomeckelian
- Submandibular

=== Operculogular series ===
Among actinopterygian and sarcopterygian fishes, the bones of the operculogular series cover the gills. They serve to protect the gills and support the rearmost part of the face; they also serve in respiration and feeding.

- Preopercle (Infrapreopercular)
- Suprapreopercular
- Opercle
- Subopercle
- Interoptercle
- Branchiostegals
- Urohyal
- Gular

=== Pectoral series ===
In basal osteichthyans as well as in many extant fishes, these bones are affixed to the posterior of the skull. In modern tetrapods they are either lost or, when present, form part of the pectoral girdle. Other parts of the girdle, such as the scapula and coracoid, develop from endochondral bone and were never part of the dermatocranium. Bones of this series may have originated as operculum-like elements covering the sixth gill arch.

- Cleithrum
- Postcleithrum (Anocleithrum)
- Presupracleithrum
- Supracleithrum
- Posttemporal
- Clavicle
- Interclavicle

== Placoderms ==
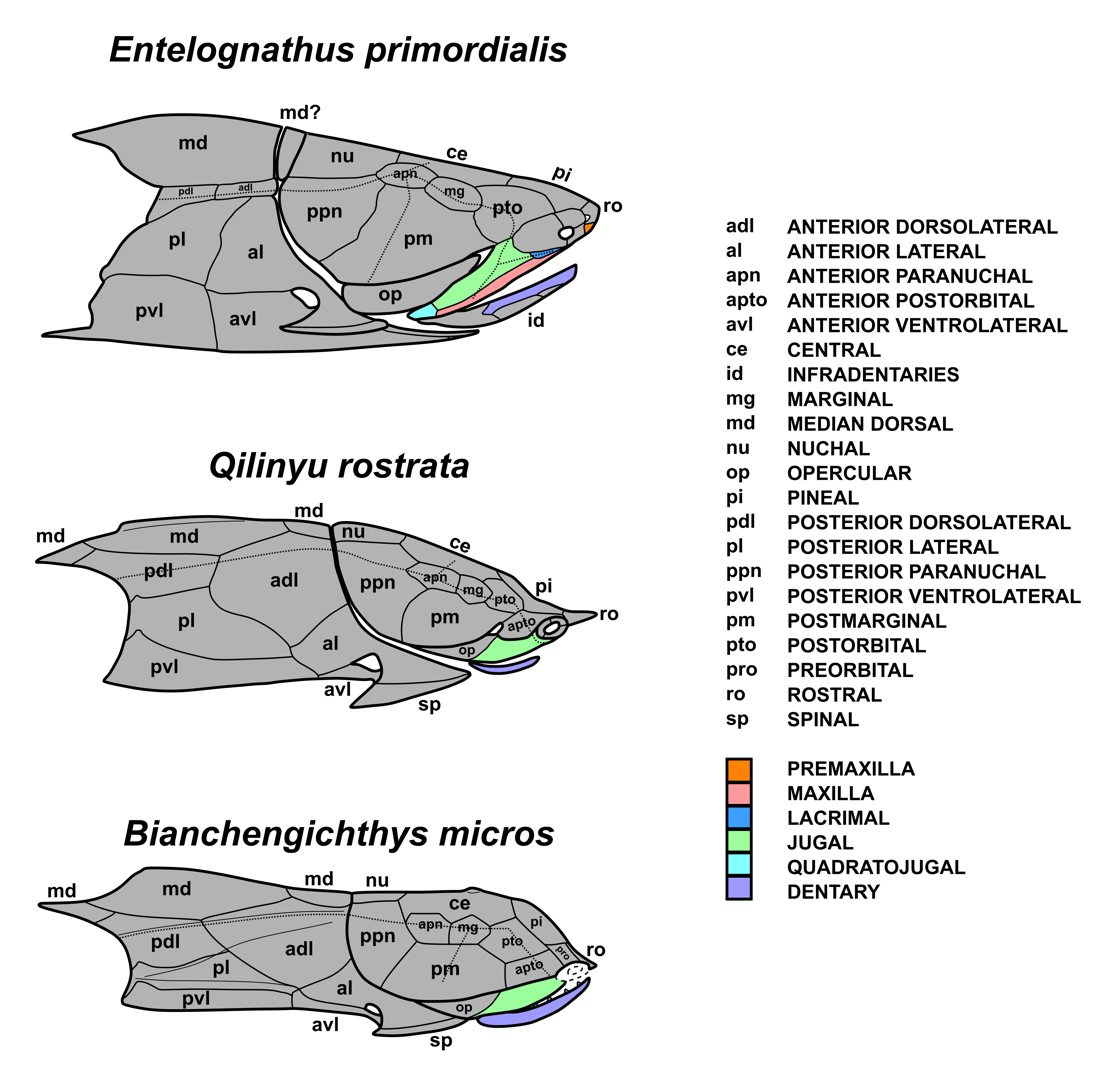
The skulls of Entelognathus and Qilinyu helped to clarify homology between placoderm and osteichthyan dermatocranial bones.

Among placoderms, bony dermal elements cover the exterior of the skull; indeed, in many placoderms, they are the only ossified portion of the skull. While some bones of the placoderm dermatocranium are known to be homologous with bones of osteichthyans, others are less certain. The following elements are divided here according to their homology with the bones in osteichthyes.

=== Facial series ===
- Premedian plate (Homologous with the osteichthyan rostral or mosaic rostral bones)
- Rostral plate (Homologous with the osteichthyan rostral or mosaic rostral bones)
- Anterior supragnathal (Homologous with the osteichthyan premaxilla)
- Posterior supragnathal (Homologous with the osteichthyan maxilla)
- Postnasal plate (Homologous with the osteichthyan nasal series)
- Pineal plate (Homologous with the osteichthyan postrostral or mosaic postrostral bones)
- Rostropineal plate

=== Orbital series ===
- Suborbital/mental (Homologous with the osteichthyan jugal/zygomatic)
- Lacrimal
- Sclerotic plates

=== Temporal series ===
- Postorbital plate (Homologous with the sarcopterygian intertemporal/actinopterygian dermosphenotic)
- Anterior paranuchal (Homologous with the sarcopterygian tabular/actinopterygian supratemporal)
- Postmarginal plate (Homologous with the osteichthyan extratemporal)
- Marginal plate (Homologous with the sarcopterygian supratemporal/actinopterygian intertemporal)
- Lateral plate

=== Vault series ===
- Preorbital plate (Homologous with the sarcopterygian parietal/actinopterygian frontal)
- Central plate (Homologous with the sarcopterygian postparietal/actinopterygian parietal)
- Nuchal plate (Homologous with the osteichthyan median extrascapular)
- Paranuchal/posterior paranuchal (Homologous with the osteichthyan lateral extrascapular)

=== Palatal series ===
- Parasphenoid

=== Mandibular series ===
- Infragnathal (Homologous with the osteichthyan dentary)

=== Opercular series ===
- Submarginal plate (Homologous with the osteichthyan operculum)

=== Pectoral series ===
- Anterior dorsolateral plate (Homologous with the osteichthyan posttemporal)
- Anterior medio-ventral plate (Homologous with the osteichthyan interclavicle)
- Posterior medio-ventral plate
- Posterior ventrolateral plate
- Posterior dorsolateral plate (Homologous with the osteichthyan supracleithrum)
- Anterior lateral plate (Homologous in part with the osteichthyan cleithrum)
- Anterior ventrolateral plate (Homologous in part with the osteichthyan cleithrum)
- Spinal plate (Homologous in part with the osteichthyan cleithrum)
- Posterior lateral plate (Homologous with the osteichthyan postcleithrum/anocleithrum)
- Interolateral plate (Homologous with the osteichthyan clavicle)
- Postnuchal
- Anterior median dorsal plate
- Posterior median dorsal plate
- Antero-ventral plate
