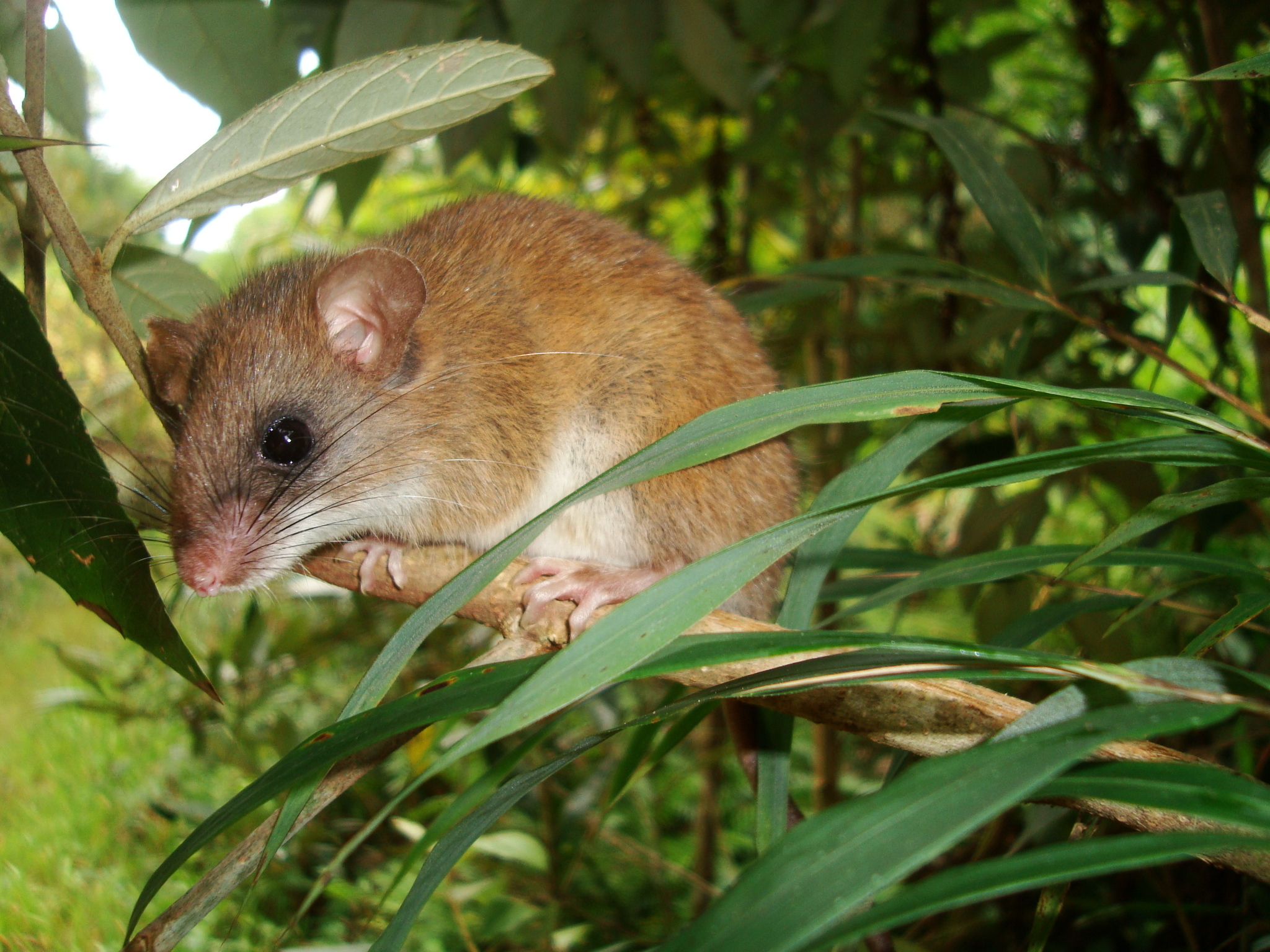

Conservation status
- Near Threatened (IUCN 3.1)

Scientific classification
- Kingdom: Animalia
- Phylum: Chordata
- Class: Mammalia
- Order: Rodentia
- Family: Cricetidae
- Subfamily: Sigmodontinae
- Tribe: Oryzomyini
- Genus: Drymoreomys; Percequillo, Weksler, & Costa, 2011
- Species: D. albimaculatus

Binomial name
- Drymoreomys albimaculatus Percequillo, Weksler, & Costa, 2011
- Collection localities of Drymoreomys albimaculatus

= Drymoreomys =

Monotypic genus of rodents

Drymoreomys is a rodent genus in the tribe Oryzomyini that lives in the Atlantic Forest of Brazil. The single species, D. albimaculatus, is known only from the states of São Paulo and Santa Catarina and was not named until 2011. It lives in the humid forest on the eastern slopes of the Serra do Mar and perhaps reproduces year-round. Although its range is relatively large and includes some protected areas, it is patchy and threatened, and the discoverers recommend that the animal be considered "Near Threatened" on the IUCN Red List. Within Oryzomyini, Drymoreomys appears to be most closely related to Eremoryzomys from the Andes of Peru, a biogeographically unusual relationship, in that the two populations are widely separated and each is adapted to an arid or a moist environment.

With a body mass of 44–64 g (1.6–2.3 oz), Drymoreomys is a medium-sized rodent with long fur that is orange to reddish-buff above and grayish with several white patches below. The pads on the hindfeet are very well developed and there is brown fur on the upper sides of the feet. The tail is brown above and below. The front part of the skull is relatively long and the ridges on the braincase are weak. The palate is short, with its back margin between the third molars. Several traits of the genitals are not seen in any other oryzomyine rodent.

== Taxonomy ==
Drymoreomys was first recorded in 1992 by Meika Mustrangi in the state of São Paulo. The animal was not, however, formally described until 2011, when Alexandre Percequillo and colleagues named it as a new genus and species within the tribe Oryzomyini: Drymoreomys albimaculatus. The generic name, Drymoreomys, combines the Greek δρυμός (drymos), meaning "forest", ὄρειος (oreios), meaning "mountain-dwelling", and μῦς (mys), meaning "mouse". The name refers to the animal's occurrence in mountain forest. The specific name, albimaculatus, derives from the Latin albus, meaning "white", and maculatus, meaning "spotted", a reference to the spots of white in the animal's fur. Percequillo and colleagues found little geographic variation among samples of Drymoreomys, although a few traits differ in frequency between populations from the states of São Paulo and Santa Catarina.

According to a phylogenetic analysis of evidence from morphology, the nuclear gene IRBP, and the mitochondrial gene cytochrome b, Drymoreomys albimaculatus is most closely related to Eremoryzomys polius, an oryzomyine from northern Peru and the only species in the genus Eremoryzomys. Together, Drymoreomys and Eremoryzomys are part of Marcelo Weksler's clade D, one of four main clades within Oryzomyini. Some subsequent studies did not support a relationship between the Drymoreomys–Eremoryzomys clade and the rest of clade D, but this is probably due to saturation of the phylogenetic signal in mitochondrial data. Oryzomyini includes well over a hundred species distributed mainly in South America, including nearby islands such as the Galápagos Islands and some of the Antilles. It is one of several tribes recognized within the subfamily Sigmodontinae, which encompasses hundreds of species found across South America and into southern North America. Sigmodontinae is the largest subfamily of the family Cricetidae, other members of which include voles, lemmings, hamsters, and deermice, all mainly from Eurasia and North America.

== Description ==
=== External morphology ===
Drymoreomys albimaculatus is a medium-sized, long-tailed, short-eared, short-footed rodent. It is quite distinct from other oryzomyines and has a number of unique traits. In 11 adults from Parque Natural Municipal Nascentes do Garcia in Santa Catarina, head and body length was 122 to 139 mm (4.8 to 5.5 in), tail length was 140 to 175 mm (5.5 to 6.9 in), hindfoot length was 25.8 to 30.5 mm (1.02 to 1.20 in), ear length was 16 to 22 mm (0.63 to 0.87 in), and body mass was 44 to 64 g (1.6 to 2.3 oz). The fur is long and dense and consists of thin, short, woolly underfur and long, thick overfur. Overall, the fur of the upperparts is orange to reddish-buff. In the closely related Eremoryzomys, the upperparts are grayish. The hairs of the underfur, which are 12 to 14 mm (0.47 to 0.55 in) long, are grayish for most of their length and orange or brown at the tip. In the overfur, the cover hairs (which form the main body of the fur), are 14 to 17 mm (0.55 to 0.67 in) long and brown at the tip, with an orange band below the tip, and the longer, sparse guard hairs are red to dark brown in the half closest to the tip and are 17 to 21 mm (0.67 to 0.83 in) long. The sides are reddish brown. On the underparts, the hairs are grayish at the base and white at the tip, except on the throat, chest, and (in some specimens) groin, where the hairs are entirely white—a trait unique among the oryzomyines. In overall appearance, the underparts are grayish, with white spots where the hairs are completely white.

The small, rounded ears are covered with dense golden hairs on the outer and with reddish brown hairs on the inner surface. The mystacial vibrissae (whiskers on the upper lip) are long, usually extending a little beyond the ears when laid back against the head, but the superciliary vibrissae (whiskers above the eyes) are short and do not extend beyond the ears. The upper surface on the forefeet is covered with brown fur, and there is white or silvery fur on the digits. Ungual tufts (fur around the bases of the claws) are present on the second through fourth digits. On the short, fairly broad hindfeet, the upper side is covered densely with silvery to white hairs near the tips of the feet and toes, and with brown fur otherwise. No other oryzomyine has such brown fur on its hindfeet. The second through fourth digits have long silvery-white ungual tufts, but those on the first digit are short. On the sole, the pads are very large. Among oryzomyines, only Oecomys and the extinct Megalomys have similarly large pads between their digits. There is a dense cover of short brown hairs on both the upper and lower sides of the tail. Unlike in Eremoryzomys, the tail is the same color above and below. The tail ends in a tuft, an unusual feature among oryzomyines.

=== Skull ===
In the skull, the rostrum (front part) is relatively long. The nasal and premaxillary bones extend in front of the incisors, forming a rostral tube, which is shared among oryzomyines only with Handleyomys. The zygomatic notch (a notch formed by a projection at the front of the zygomatic plate, a bony plate at the side of the skull) is shallow. The interorbital region (between the eyes) is narrow and long, with the narrowest part towards the front. The crests on the braincase and interorbital region are weakly developed. Eremoryzomys has larger crests on its interorbital region.

The incisive foramina (openings in the front part of the palate) are long, sometimes extending to between the first molars (M1). The bony palate is broad and short, with the posterior margin between the third molars (M3). Nephelomys levipes is the only other oryzomyine with such a short palate, although that of Eremoryzomys polius is only slightly longer. The posterolateral palatal pits (openings in the back part of the palate near the M3) vary from small to fairly large and are located in slight fossas (depressions). In Eremoryzomys, these fossas are deeper. The roof of the mesopterygoid fossa, the opening behind the palate, is completely closed or contains small sphenopalatine vacuities. The vacuities are much larger in Eremoryzomys. The alisphenoid strut, a piece of bone that separates two foramina (openings), is present in all Drymoreomys specimens examined, except in one juvenile specimen.

The mandible (lower jaw) is long and low. The coronoid process, the frontmost of the three main processes (projections) at the back of the jawbone, is large and about as high as the condyloid process behind it. The angular process, below the condyloid, is fairly short and does not extend further backwards than the condyloid. There is no noticeable capsular process (a raising at the back of the jaw that houses the root of the lower incisor).

=== Dentition ===
The upper incisors are opisthodont (with the cutting surface oriented backwards) and have orange to yellow enamel. The upper molar rows are either almost parallel or slightly convergent with each other toward the front. Holochilus and Lundomys are the only other oryzomyines with non-parallel molar rows. The valleys between the cusps of the upper molars extending from the inner and outer sides overlap slightly across the midlines of the teeth. The molars are high-cusped, almost hypsodont. On M1, the anterocone (the front cusp) is divided into two cuspules on the lingual (inner, towards the tongue) and labial (outer, towards the lips) sides of the teeth. The mesoloph, a crest near the middle of the labial side of the tooth, is long and well developed on each of the three upper molars. On the lower molars (m1 to m3), the cusps on the labial side are located slightly in front of their lingual counterparts. The anteroconid, the front cusp on the m1, is divided in two. The m1, m2, and usually m3 have a mesolophid, a crest corresponding to the mesoloph but located on the lingual side. Each of the lower molars has two roots.

=== Other anatomy ===
There are 12 ribs and 19 thoracolumbar (chest and abdomen), four sacral, and 36 to 38 caudal (tail) vertebrae. There are three digits at the tip of the penis, of which the central one is the largest. The two lateral digits are not supported by mounds of the baculum (penis bone). There is only one spine on the papilla (nipple-like projection) on the upper side of the penis. On the urethral process, located in the crater at the end of the penis, a fleshy process at the side, the lateral lobule, is present. The preputial glands (glands in front of the genitals) are large. The lack of lateral bacular mounds, presence of a lateral lobule, and size of the preputial glands are all unique traits among the oryzomyines.

=== Karyotype ===
The karyotype of Drymoreomys albimaculatus is 2n=62, FN=62: the animal has 62 chromosomes, and 29 pairs of autosomes (non-sex chromosomes) are acrocentric (with one arm so short as to be almost invisible) and one small pair is metacentric (with two equally long arms). Both sex chromosomes are submetacentric (with one arm noticeably longer than the other), and X is larger than Y. Blocks of heterochromatin are present on all autosomes and the long arm of Y. Telomeric sequences are found near the centromeres of the sex chromosomes. Aspects of this karyotype—with a high number of mostly acrocentric chromosomes and the presence of heterochromatin on the Y chromosome—are consistent with the pattern seen in other oryzomyines. However, no other oryzomyine has exactly the same karyotype as D. albimaculatus. Other species in clade D have fewer chromosomes, down to 16 in Nectomys palmipes, although the karyotype of Eremoryzomys polius is unknown. This suggests an evolutionary trend of decreasing chromosome number within the clade.

== Distribution and ecology ==
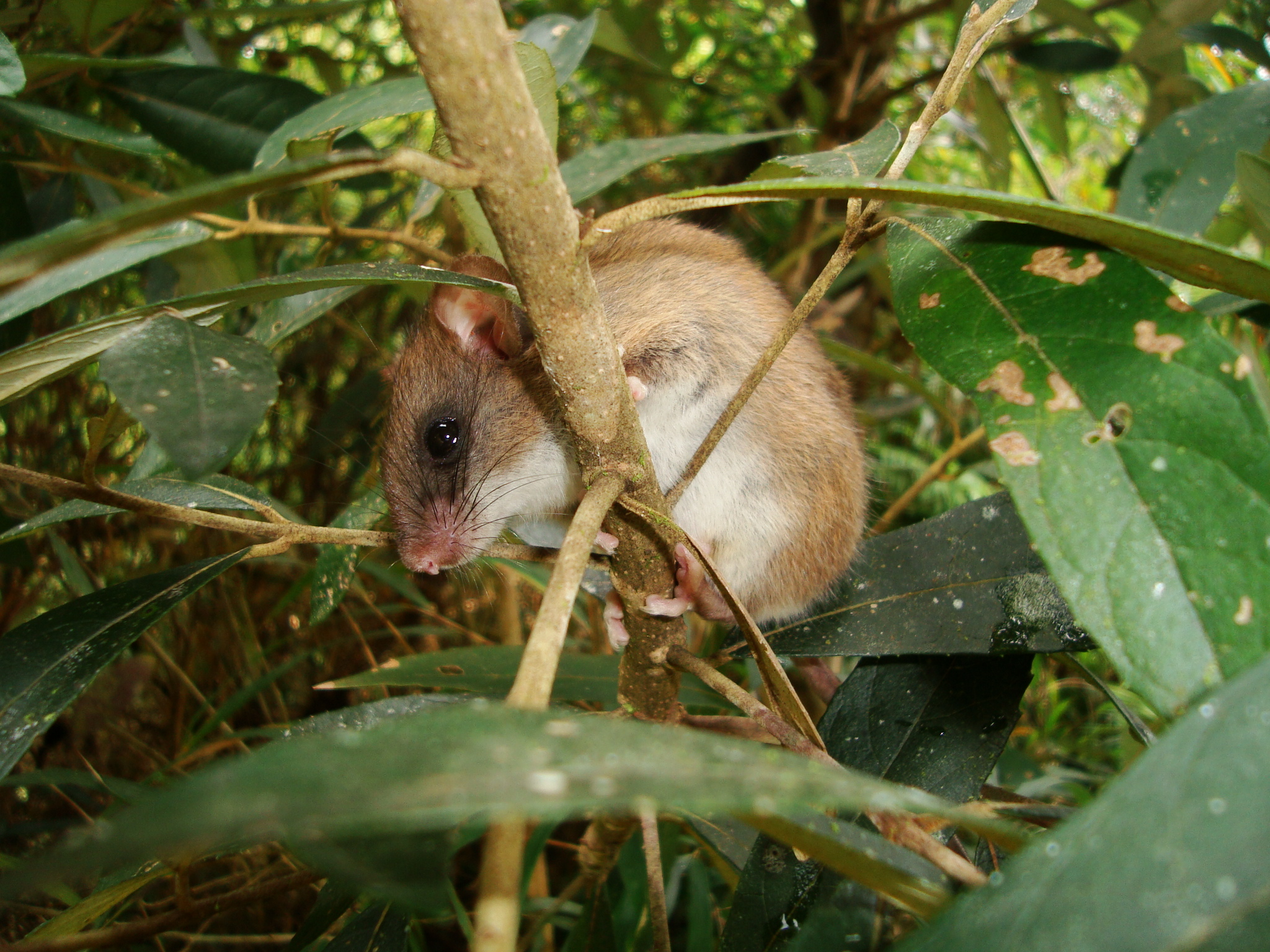
Some morphological traits in Drymoreomys suggest it is arboreal.

Drymoreomys albimaculatus occurs in the Atlantic Forest on the eastern slopes of the Serra do Mar in the Brazilian states of São Paulo and Santa Catarina, at 650 to 1,200 m (2,130 to 3,940 ft) above sea level. It has not been found in the intervening state of Paraná, but is likely to occur there. The biogeographical pattern indicated by the relationship between Drymoreomys and the Andean Eremoryzomys is unusual. While there are some similar cases of relationships between Andean and Atlantic Forest animals, these involve inhabitants of humid forests in the Andes; Eremoryzomys, by contrast, lives in an arid area.

Drymoreomys albimaculatus appears to be a specialist of dense, moist, montane and premontane forest. It has been found in disturbed and secondary forests as well as in pristine forest, but probably needs contiguous forest to survive. Reproductive activity has been observed in females in June, November, and December and in males in December, suggesting that the species breeds year-round. Although some of its morphological traits, such as the very large pads, are suggestive of arboreal (tree-dwelling) habits, most specimens were collected in pitfall traps on the ground.

== Conservation status ==
The range of Drymoreomys albimaculatus is relatively large and the species occurs in several protected areas, but it has only been found in seven localities and its habitat is threatened by deforestation and fragmentation. Therefore, Percequillo and colleagues suggest that the species be assessed as "Near Threatened" under the IUCN Red List criteria.
