= Eremoryzomys =

Conservation status
- Data Deficient (IUCN 3.1)

Scientific classification
- Kingdom: Animalia
- Phylum: Chordata
- Class: Mammalia
- Order: Rodentia
- Family: Cricetidae
- Subfamily: Sigmodontinae
- Tribe: Oryzomyini
- Genus: Eremoryzomys; Weksler, Percequillo, & Voss, 2006
- Species: E. polius

Binomial name
- Eremoryzomys polius (Osgood, 1913)
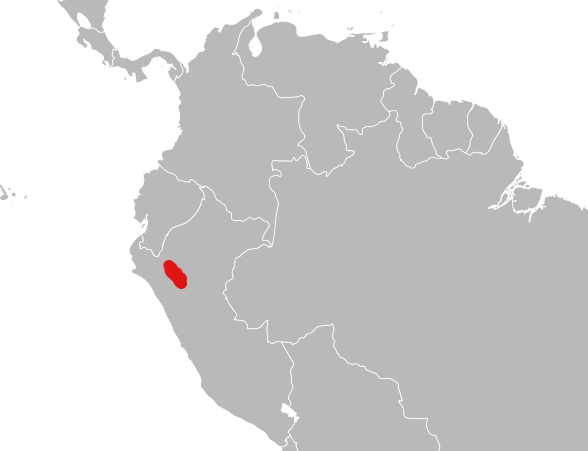
- Range in northern Peru

Synonyms
- Oryzomys polius Osgood, 1913; [Eremoryzomys] polius: Weksler, Percequillo, and Voss, 2006

Rodent species in the family Cricetidae from central Peru

Eremoryzomys polius, also known as the gray rice rat or the Marañon oryzomys, is a rodent species in the tribe Oryzomyini of the family Cricetidae. Discovered in 1912 and first described in 1913 by Wilfred Osgood, it was originally placed in Oryzomys and named Oryzomys polius. In 2006, a cladistic analysis found that it was not closely related to Oryzomys in the strict sense or to any other oryzomyine then known, so that it is now placed in its own genus, Eremoryzomys. The Brazilian genus Drymoreomys, named in 2011, is probably the closest relative of Eremoryzomys. Eremoryzomys has a limited distribution in the dry upper valley of the Marañón River in central Peru, but may yet contain more than one species.

A large, long-tailed rice rat, with head and body length of 138 to 164 mm (5.4 to 6.5 in), E. polius has gray fur and short ears. There are well-developed ungual tufts of hair on the hindfeet. Females have eight mammae. The rostrum (front part of the skull) is long and robust and the braincase is rounded. The bony palate is relatively short. The IUCN assesses the conservation status of the species as "Data Deficient"; it is poorly known but may be threatened by habitat destruction.

== Taxonomy ==
The first two specimens of Eremoryzomys polius were collected by Wilfred Osgood and M.P. Anderson in 1912. The next year, Osgood described these animals as a new species in the genus Oryzomys, Oryzomys polius. Osgood wrote that he was unable to find any species closely related to O. polius and compared it with O. xanthaeolus (currently Aegialomys xanthaeolus) "for convenience". Its relationships remained obscure ever afterward and it was never assigned to any of the several groups of species recognized within Oryzomys.

In 2006, Marcelo Weksler published a large-scale cladistic analysis of Oryzomyini ("rice rats"), the tribe to which O. polius belongs. He used both morphological data and molecular characters from the IRBP gene. In all of his analyses, O. polius was found to be part of clade D, one of four large groups within Oryzomyini, as the sister group to a clade containing all the other species of clade D. Clade D was supported by two shared derived (synapomorphic) molecular characters and by seven morphological synapomorphies—the tail has a different color above and below; the parietal bone extends to the side of the skull; the incisive foramina (openings in the palate) extend back between the first molars; the posterolateral palatal pits (perforations of the palate near the third molars) are complex; the sphenopalatine vacuities (openings in the mesopterygoid fossa, the gap behind the end of the palate) are large; the pattern of the arterial circulation in the head is derived; and the posteroloph (a crest at the back) is present on the third upper molar. Two other molecular synapomorphies supported the clade of all members of clade D except O. polius, coupled with three morphological traits—in these species, but not in O. polius, the first upper molar has an additional small root at the outer (labial) side; the first lower molar has additional small roots; and the second upper molar has the mesoflexus (one of the valleys between the cusps and crests) divided in two.

In Weksler's analysis, species placed in Oryzomys did not form a coherent (monophyletic) group, but instead were found at various positions across the oryzomyine tree, and he suggested that most of these species, including O. polius, should be placed in new genera. Later in 2006, Weksler and others described ten new genera for species formerly placed in Oryzomys, including Eremoryzomys for polius; thus, the species is now known as Eremoryzomys polius. In reference to its "isolated distribution", they incorporated the Greek word eremia "lonely place" into the generic name. The 2008 IUCN Red List, citing Pacheco, commented that Eremoryzomys may in fact include more than one species. In 2011, a new oryzomyine, Drymoreomys albimaculatus, was described from southeastern Brazil, and phylogenetic analysis of morphological and molecular data suggested that this animal is the closest known relative of Eremoryzomys.

Eremoryzomys is now one of about 28 genera in the tribe Oryzomyini, which includes well over a hundred species distributed mainly in South America, including nearby islands such as the Galápagos Islands and some of the Antilles. Oryzomyini is one of several tribes recognized within the subfamily Sigmodontinae, which encompasses hundreds of species found across South America and into southern North America. Sigmodontinae itself is the largest subfamily of the family Cricetidae, other members of which include voles, lemmings, hamsters, and deermice, all mainly from Eurasia and North America.

== Description ==
Eremoryzomys polius is a large, long-tailed rice rat that in color resembles some North American woodrats (Neotoma). The fur is grayish above and lighter below, where the hairs are gray at the bases but white at the tips. The external ears (pinnae) are short and the tail is dark above and light below. The hindfeet have well-developed ungual tufts (patches of hair) along the plantar margins and between all of the digits, a character shared only with Sooretamys angouya among oryzomyines. The squamae, small structures resembling scales that cover the soles of the hindfeet in many oryzomyines, are well developed. The claw of the first digit extends nearly to the end of the first phalanx of the second toe and the claw of the fifth toe extends slightly beyond the first phalanx of the fourth toe. As in most oryzomyines, the female has eight mammae. Head and body length is 138 to 164 mm (5.4 to 6.5 in). In Osgood's original two specimens, an old female and an adult female, tail length is 188 and 180 mm (7.4 and 7.1 in), respectively; hindfoot length is 30 and 30 mm (1.2 and 1.2 in); and greatest skull length is 37 and 34.7 mm (1.46 and 1.37 in). E. polius has 12 thoracic, 7 or 8 lumbar, and 35 or 36 caudal vertebrae; the presence of 12 thoracic vertebrae is a putative synapomorphy of Oryzomyini.

=== Skull ===
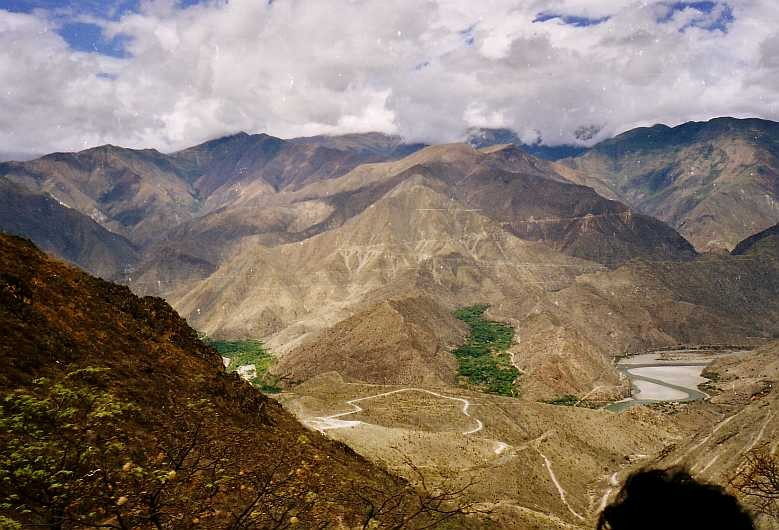
Eremoryzomys occurs in the basin of the upper Río Marañón.

In the skull, the rostrum (front part) is long and robust. The nasal bones are short, not extending further back than the lacrimals, and the premaxillaries extend about as far back as the nasals. The zygomatic notch, an extension at the front of the zygomatic plate, is present. The plate's back margin is level with the front of the first upper molar. A strong jugal bone is present in the zygomatic arch (cheekbone), so that the maxillary and squamosal bones, which form the front and back parts of the arch, respectively, do not overlap when seen from the side. (Note: Weksler et al., 2006, p. 10; Percequillo et al., 2011, p. 388. Weksler, 2006, table 5, scores Eremoryzomys (as Oryzomys polius) as having overlapping squamosals and maxillaries (see character state definitions for character 30, p. 32).) The narrowest part of the interorbital region (located between the eyes) is to the front and the region's margins exhibit strong beading. Various crests develop on the rounded braincase, especially in old animals. The parietal bones form part of the roof of the braincase and, unlike in some other rice rats, also extend to the sides of the braincase. The interparietal bone at the back of the braincase is narrow and wedge-shaped, so that the parietal and occipital bones meet extensively.

The incisive foramina are very long, extending well between the molars. The posterolateral palatal pits are well-developed and recessed into a fossa (depression). The bony palate is relatively short, with the mesopterygoid fossa extending forward to the end of the molar row or even between the third molars. (Note: Weksler et al., 2006, p. 10. Percequillo et al., 2011, p. 367, write that the fossa does not reach between the molars in Eremoryzomys.) The roof of the fossa is perforated by large sphenopalatine vacuities. Usually, an alisphenoid strut is present; this extension of the alisphenoid bone separates two foramina (openings) in the skull, the masticatory–buccinator foramen and the foramen ovale accessorium. The condition of various grooves and foramina of the skull indicates that the pattern of the arterial circulation of the head is derived. The subsquamosal fenestra, an opening at the back of the skull determined by the shape of the squamosal bone, is large and the mastoid bone is perforated by a fenestra (opening). The squamosal lacks a suspensory process that contacts the tegmen tympani, the roof of the tympanic cavity, a defining character of oryzomyines.

In the mandible, the mental foramen, an opening in the mandible just before the first molar, opens to the outside, not upwards as in a few other oryzomyines. The upper and lower masseteric ridges, which anchor some of the chewing muscles, usually join into a single crest at a point below the first molar and do not extend forward beyond the molar. There is no distinct capsular process of the lower incisor, a trait Eremoryzomys shares with only a few other oryzomyines.

=== Molars ===
The molars are bunodont (with the cusps higher than the connecting crests) and brachydont (low-crowned). On the upper first and second molar, the outer and inner valleys between the cusps and crests do not interpenetrate. Many accessory crests are present, including the mesolophs and mesolophids. The anterocone and anteroconid, the front cusps on the upper and lower first molar, are not divided into smaller outer and inner cusps. Small accessory roots are absent from the molars, so that each of the three upper molars has two roots on the outer side and one on the inner side and each of the lower molars has one root at the front and one at the back.

== Distribution and status ==
As far as now known, Eremoryzomys polius is confined to a small area in central Peru, at an altitude of 760 to 2,100 m (2,490 to 6,890 ft), but the species may range more widely. It occurs in forest in the dry lowlands of the upper parts of the basin of the Marañón River, east of the main mountain range of the Andes. The biogeographical pattern indicated by the relationship between Eremoryzomys and the Brazilian Drymoreomys is unusual. While there are some similar cases of relationships between Andean and Atlantic Forest animals, these involve inhabitants of humid forests in the Andes; Eremoryzomys, in contrast, lives in an arid area. Because E. polius is so poorly known, the 2008 IUCN Red List assesses it as "Data Deficient". It is threatened by habitat destruction for cattle pasture and is not known from any protected areas.

== Literature cited ==
- Musser, G. G.; Carleton, M. D. (2005). "Superfamily Muroidea". In Wilson, D. E.; Reeder, D. M. (eds.). Mammal Species of the World: A Taxonomic and Geographic Reference (3rd ed.). Johns Hopkins University Press. p. 1153. ISBN 978-0-8018-8221-0. OCLC 62265494.
- Osgood, W.H. 1913. New Peruvian mammals. Field Museum of Natural History, Zoölogical Series 10:93–100.
- Pacheco, V.; Zeballos, H.; Vivar, E.; Weksler, M. (2008). "Eremoryzomys polius". IUCN Red List of Threatened Species. 2008 e.T15609A4891730. doi:10.2305/IUCN.UK.2008.RLTS.T15609A4891730.en.
- Percequillo, Alexandre R.; Weksler, Marcelo; Costa, Leonora P. (February 2011). "A new genus and species of rodent from the Brazilian Atlantic Forest (Rodentia: Cricetidae: Sigmodontinae: Oryzomyini), with comments on oryzomyine biogeography". Zoological Journal of the Linnean Society. 161 (2): 357–390. doi:10.1111/j.1096-3642.2010.00643.x. ISSN 1096-3642.
- Weksler, M. 2006. Phylogenetic relationships of oryzomyine rodents (Muroidea: Sigmodontinae): separate and combined analyses of morphological and molecular data. Bulletin of the American Museum of Natural History 296:1–149.
- Weksler, M., Percequillo, A.R. and Voss, R.S. 2006. Ten new genera of oryzomyine rodents (Cricetidae: Sigmodontinae). American Museum Novitates 3537:1–29.
