= Dermal sphenethmoid =

The dermal sphenethmoid is an unpaired midline bone present in the skull roof of some frogs. It overlies the sphenethmoid, and fuses to it during ontogeny. Unlike the true sphenethmoid, which ossifies endochondrally, the dermal sphenethmoid ossifies as dermal bone. In the Russian scientific literature, it has been referred to as the internasofrontal.

== Anatomy ==
The dermal sphenethmoid is a part of the dermatocranium, and articulates ventrally with the sphenethmoid (with which it typically fuses). It articulates posteriorly with the frontoparietals and anteriorly with the nasals.

== Evolution ==
The dermal sphenethmoid is a neomorph present in some frogs of the family Hylidae (including Triprion and Nyctimantis), Bombinatoridae, and Pelobatidae. In the Pelobatidae, the single midline dermal sphenethmoid arises from a single centre of ossification and ossifies only after metamorphosis. Owing to its close degree of fusion to the sphenethmoid, the dermal sphenethmoid may be more widespread than is commonly thought.

It has been suggested that the dermal sphenethmoid may represent an atavistic occurrence of the postrostral bone.
