= Sphenethmoid =

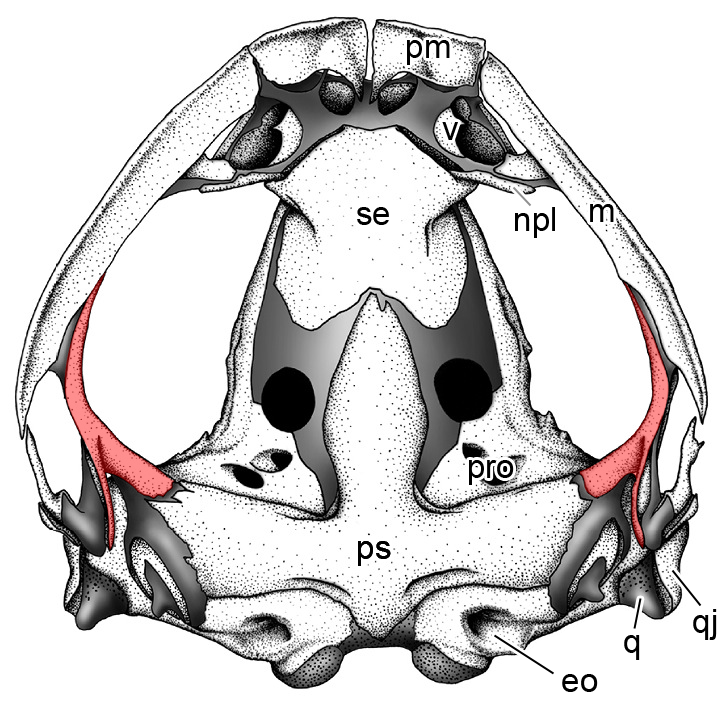
Skull of the frog Osornophryne in palatal view. Sphenethmoid labeled se.

The sphenethmoid or ethmosphenoid is a bone found in the anterior part of the skull in some vertebrates. It ossifies from a part of the chondrocranium that spans from the nasal capsule to the region of the eye, and incorporates the sphenoid and ethmoid regions of the skull. It forms the anteriormost portion of the braincase when present.

== Anatomy ==
Depending on the taxon, the sphenethmoid may be composed of a singular median bone or two paired elements separated by cartilage that has not undergone ossification. In lissamphibians, the sphenethmoid ossifies from anywhere between two and six ossification centres. The degree of ossification in the element is highly variable among taxa.

Anteriorly, the sphenethmoid is contiguous with the cartilaginous nasal septum; posteriorly, it is contiguous with the planum antorbitale. It articulates dorsally with the nasals, posterodorsally with the frontals (or frontoparietals), and ventrally with the vomer, parasphenoid, and palatines (or neopalatines).

When multiple centres of ossification are present, they are referred to by the names of bones present in analogous positions in other vertebrates—the orbitosphenoid, the mesethmoid, the basisphenoid, and the supraethmoid. The sphenethmoid in batrachians is believed to be homologous with the orbitosphenoid, but with a much greater scope of ossification.

Among early tetrapods, the sphenethmoid has historically been confused with the orbitosphenoid.

== Evolution ==
The region of the skull containing the sphenethmoid is ancestrally cartilaginous, and undergoes ossification in parallel in various lineages.

The element is generally referred to as the ethmosphenoid in fishes, and the sphenethmoid in tetrapods.

In ancestral sarcopterygians, the braincase had a joint between the sphenethmoid and the otoccipital. In early tetrapods and their closest relatives, the sphenethmoid is highly co-ossified with the basisphenoid, and the two elements often cannot be distinguished. Among early tetrapods, the sphenethmoid and otoccipital were increasingly co-ossified; later in the evolution of tetrapods, however, the spenethmoid region became less ossified and increasingly cartilaginous.

Among early temnospondyls such as Eryops, the sphenethmoid was heavily ossified to the braincase. Later temnospondyl groups, however, often had isolated and reduced sphenethmoids. In the amphibian clade Batrachia (frogs and salamanders), the sphenethmoid(s) ossifies from two to six ossification centres and makes up a substantial portion of the anterior braincase. This contrasts with caecilians, where the sphenethmoid region is divided into a number of distinct ossifications. The sphenethmoid makes up a substantial portion of the skull's dorsal surface in frogs and, to a lesser degree, salamanders. In frogs, the element forms a hollow structure divided by the nasal septum. In casque-headed hylid frogs such as Triprion and Nyctimantis a dermal bone known as the dermal sphenethmoid forms part of the skull roof dorsal to the sphenethmoid. The dermal sphenethmoid often co-ossifies with the sphenethmoid during development.

In theropod dinosaurs, including tyrannosaurids, the sphenethmoid ossifies as part of the ethmoid complex, alongside the mesethmoid. The sphenethmoid in these taxa houses the olfactory bulbs.
