= Laterosphenoid =

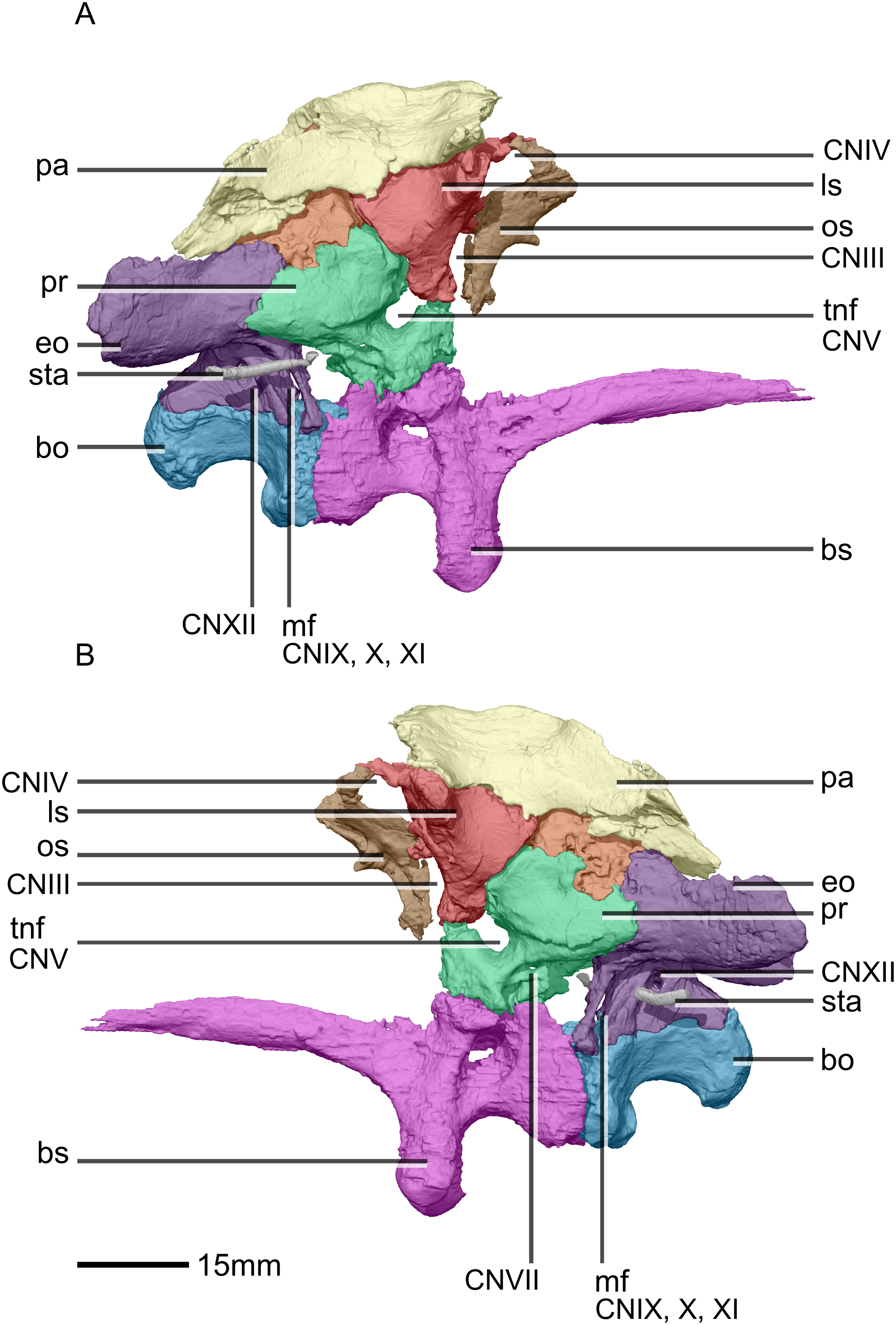
Right (upper) and left (lower) lateral views of the braincase of Massospondylus. The laterosphenoid is shown in red and labeled ls.

The laterosphenoid or pleurosphenoid is a paired endochondral bone of the skull that makes up the anterior and lateral part of the braincase in some vertebrates. The terminology and homology of the element has been marked by extensive confusion; originally thought to be homologous with the mammalian alisphenoid, it is now known to be a separate element. It has also been historically confused with the orbitosphenoid. Additionally, the names "laterosphenoid" and "pleurosphenoid" have been applied to a number of non-homologous bones in various vertebrate groups.

In older studies, it is rarely referred to as the postoptic or otosphenoid.

== Anatomy ==
When present, the laterosphenoids enclose the anterior part of the lateral wall of the braincase. Each laterosphenoid articulates posteriorly with the prootic, anteriorly and dorsally with the frontal, dorsally with the parietal. It contains the foramina for the ophthalmic and ethmoid arteries and partly encloses cranial nerves II, III, IV, and V. It forms an attachment point for muscles associated with closing the jaw. The laterosphenoid is an ossification of the pila antotica, the pila metoptica, and the taenia medialis planum supraseptale.

== Evolution ==
The laterosphenoid is a part of the chondrocranium; a true laterosphenoid is generally considered to only occur in Archelosauria (Archosauromorpha (including birds) and turtles). In these taxa, it serves as the origin point of two muscles (the M. pseudotemporalis and the M. adductor mandibulae externus profundus) that help to close the jaw; evolutionary enlargements of these muscles associated with a predatory lifestyle have been suggested as a driver of the bone's origin.

Bones termed the "laterosphenoid" or "pleurosphenoid" have also been stated to be present in a similar position in lepidosaurs, actinopterygian fish, lissamphibians, and the platypus. These bones are not generally considered as sharing homology with the laterosphenoid of archosauromorphs, but their usage remains. In particular, the laterosphenoid of lepidosaurs (squamates and tuataras) may or may not be homologous with that of archelosaurs, suggesting that the presence of the element may in fact be plesiomorphic to reptiles.

The so-called "laterosphenoid" of alethinophidian snakes ossifies as dermal bone, making it part of the dermatocranium. This element is now referred to as the ophidiosphenoid.

== History of study ==
The term "laterosphenoid" was introduced by Geoffroy Sainte-Hilaire in 1824 for a bone present in crocodilians; nevertheless, the bone was referred to as the alisphenoid through much of the 19th century. The term "postoptic" was introduced by Edward Drinker Cope, and the term otosphenoid by Robert Broom; neither gained widespread usage. The term laterosphenoid was introduced again, seemingly independently, by Friedrich von Huene in 1911 for the same bone in dinosaurs. The term did not come into wider usage until 1924, when William K. Gregory and G. K. Noble demonstrated that the mammalian alisphenoid was homologous to the reptilian epipterygoid, and not to the laterosphenoid. Edwin Stephen Goodrich in 1930 introduced the name "pleurosphenoid" for the same element, without clear reason for the difference; subsequent authors used either of the terms interchangeably across a number of taxa. A 1993 paper recommended the usage of "laterosphenoid" and restricting the name to the element in archosauriformes, but this has not been uniformly followed.
