= Frontoparietal =

Skull bone in vertberates

Skull of the frog. Frontoparietal is labeled F.

The frontoparietal is a bone present in the skulls of some vertebrates, located above and between the eyes. It is formed as a fusion of the frontal and parietal bones, and may be paired (incorporating just the frontal and parietal of one side) or unpaired (incorporating both frontals and both parietals).

== Anatomy ==
The frontoparietal is a dermal bone, and by extension part of the dermatocranium, like the frontals and parietals. Generally, the frontoparietal articulates anteriorly with the nasals, posterolaterally with the squamosals, and ventrally with the bones of the neurocranium. It covers the dorsal surface of the brain.

== Evolution ==
The frontoparietal has evolved convergently in a number of different vertebrate lineages.

In frogs, but not other amphibians, the frontoparietal forms one of the main roofing bones of the skull. In most frogs the frontoparietal is paired, with a left and right element present; the bones are ancestrally long, thin elements separated by the frontoparietal fenestra. In pelobatids and pipoids, however, the frontoparietal is an unpaired element that incorporates all four bones. Despite its evolutionary origin as a fusion of the frontal and parietal, the frontoparietal of frogs often develops from a single ossification centre.

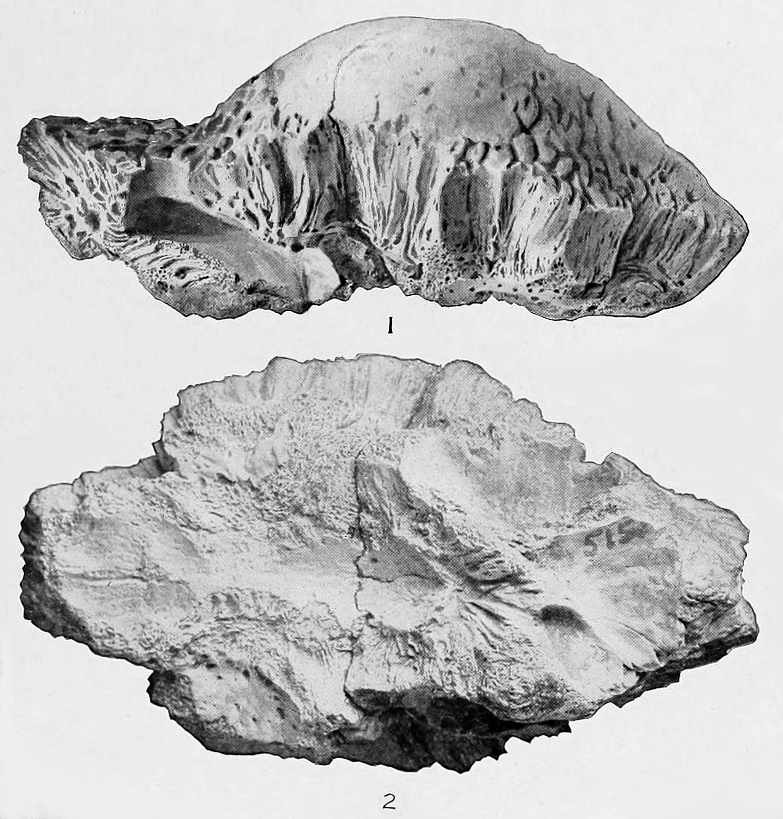
Lateral and ventral views of the frontoparietal dome of Stegoceras.

In pachycephalosaurid dinosaurs, the frontals and parietals are fused and thickened into a dome. The function of this dome has been the subject of debate since its discovery, and is generally considered to fill a role in intraspecific combat (see also: Pachycephalosaurus#Dome function). The sutures between the frontals and parietals are often visible externally in young pachycephalosaurs, but become increasingly obscured with age.

On the basis of embryology, it has been suggested that the frontal bone of birds may in fact be a frontoparietal.
