= Orbitosphenoid =

Paired bone of the skull

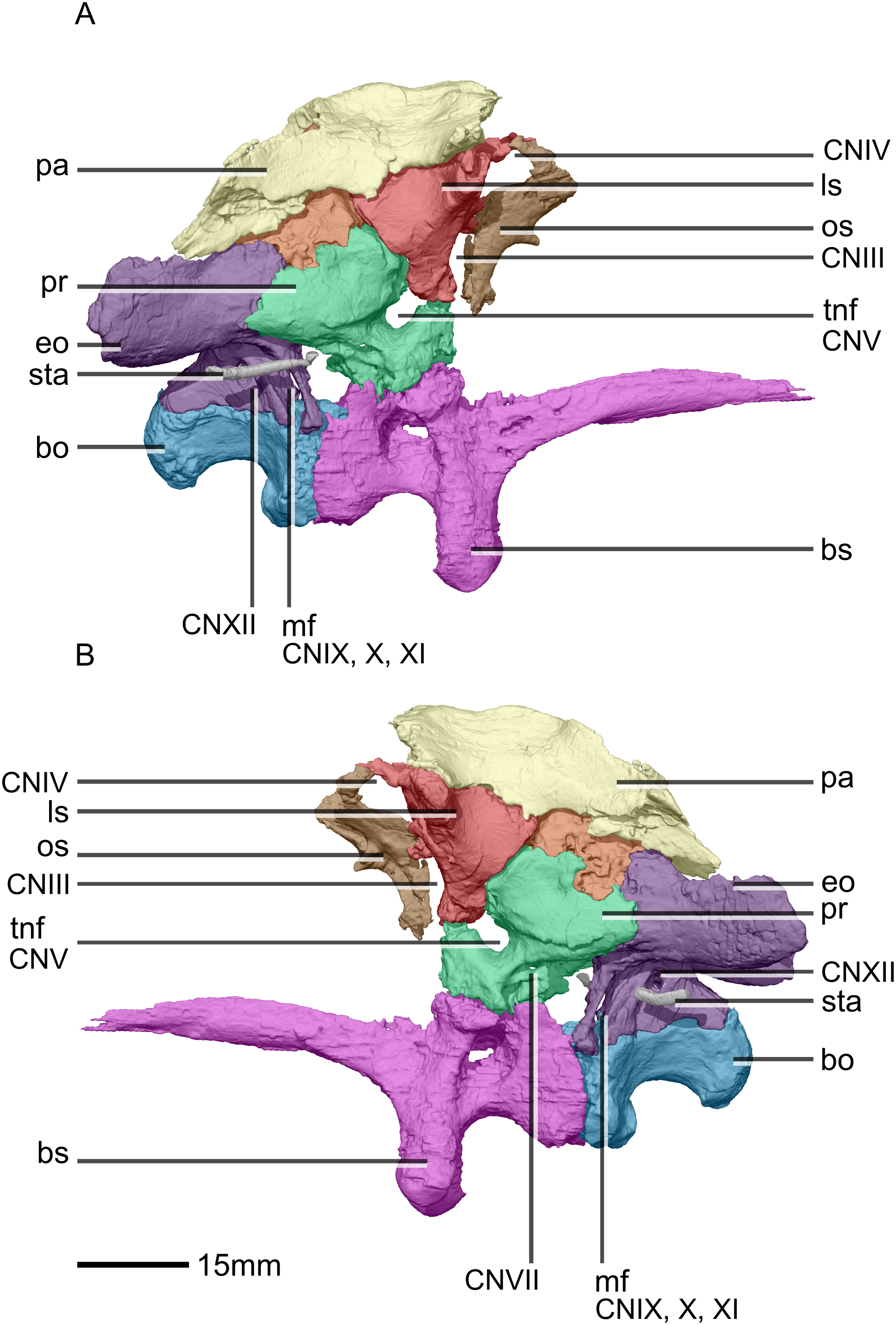
Braincase of Massospondylus in right and left lateral view. Orbitosphenoid is coloured brown and labeled os.

The orbitosphenoid is a paired bone of the skull present in the front of the braincase in many vertebrates.

== Anatomy ==
The orbitosphenoid is one of the bones of the sphenoid region. It ossifies endochondrally from the trabecular cartilages, and thus forms a part of the chondrocranium. The orbitosphenoids articulate medially with the presphenoid, and form an anterior portion of the braincase.

In primates, the orbitosphenoid may invade membranes surrounding the optic canal via ectochondral ossification.

== Evolution ==
The orbitosphenoid was ancestrally a part of the chondrocranium, the cartilaginous floor of the braincase. In placoderms, chondrichthyans, and other groups that lack an ossified chondrocranium, the orbitosphenoids are absent.

In actinopterygian fishes, the orbitosphenoids are compound elements; the "anterior orbitosphenoid" is simply referred to as the orbitosphenoid, whereas the posterior portion of the elements are referred to as the pleurosphenoid or pterosphenoid; rarely, an additional element called the rhinosphenoid is included. The anterior and posterior orbitosphenoids are believed to have fused to form the orbitosphenoids of sarcopterygians (including tetrapods).

Among early tetrapods such as recumbirostrans, the orbitosphenoids are ossified and make up the anterior portion of the braincase; in some cases, they may form a part of the ossified nasal septum. Orbitosphenoids are present in modern caecilians; in batrachians, the sphenoid region is incorporated into the sphenethmoid, which is believed to be homologous with the orbitosphenoid (albeit with a much greater scope of ossification).

Among lepidosaurs (squamates and rhynchocephalians), the orbitosphenoids are ancestrally cartilaginous. Ossified orbitosphenoids are believed to have been ancestrally present in the clade Episquamata, and are also present among many members of Scinciformata. In amphisbaenians, the orbitosphenoid fuses to dermal elements to form the tabulosphenoid.

The orbitosphenoids are unossified in turtles. Orbitosphenoids are present among archosaurs, where they are anterior to the laterosphenoid and partly enclose the foramina for cranial nerves II and III. Among non-archosaur archosauriforms, the orbitosphenoid may have been fused to the laterosphenoid.

Most non-mammalian synapsids have ossified but unfused orbitosphenoids; in ancestral cynodonts, the two orbitsphenoids are fused to each other but not to the rest of the braincase, and form a hemi-cylindrical shape.

In humans and many other mammals, the orbitosphenoids fuse with the presphenoid, the basisphenoid, and the paired alisphenoids to form the sphenoid bone, of which it is the lesser wing.
