= Pterygoid bone =

Paired bone forming part of the palate of many vertebrates

Skull diagram of Champsosaurus, showing the pterygoid bone in red-violet (visible in inferior view at lower right and posterior to the ectopterygoid bone in lateral view at top)

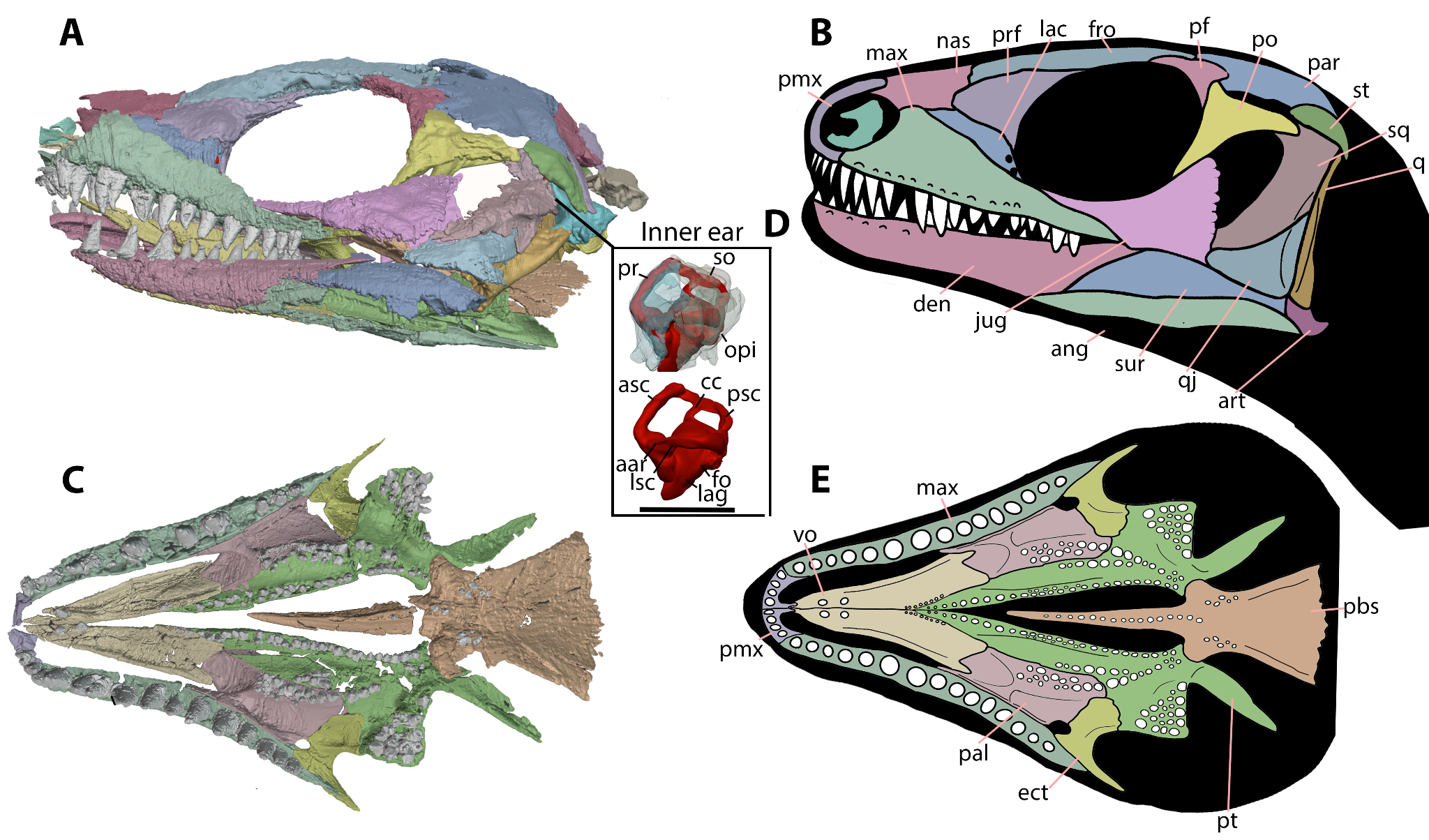
Skull of the early reptile Milleretta (Millerettidae), showing the pterygoid bearing palatal teeth in green (labeled pt, bottom right)

The pterygoid is a paired bone forming part of the palate of many vertebrates, behind the palatine bones. In fishes, it is often known as the entopterygoid or mesopterygoid, to distinguish it from the ectopterygoid.

== Anatomy ==
The pterygoid is a flat and thin lamina, united to the underside of the sphenoid region. Anteriorly, it typically contacts the vomer; laterally, it contacts the palatine and ectopterygoid; posteriorly it contacts the quadrate. Posterolaterally it forms the border of the subtemporal fenestra. In many early tetrapods the pterygoid bears teeth (palatal dentition), which are retained by some living squamates.

The pterygoid ossifies intramembranously.

== Evolution ==
The entopterygoid is present in teleosts, but its homology is unclear.

In mammals, the pterygoid fuses with the ectopterygoid; the resulting fusion is sometimes referred to simply as the pterygoid.

In humans, the pterygoid-ectopterygoid element fuses with the orbitosphenoids, the alisphenoid, the presphenoid, and the basisphenoid to become to the sphenoid bone, of which it is the pterygoid process.
