= Ectochondral ossification =

Ectochondral ossification is a method of bone development in vertebrates. It is sometimes known as zuwachsknochen.

== Overview ==
Traditionally, bone is considered to ossify in one of two ways: endochondral ossification and intramembranous ossification. In the former, the element originally develops as cartilage; one or more ossification centres appear in the cartilage, from which bone grows outward, conforming to the shape of the original cartilage to produce endochondral bone. In intramembranous ossification, the element originally develops as a membrane, then ossifies as bone without a cartilginous precursor, forming dermal bone.

However, observations by Edward Fawcett in 1910 suggested greater complexity in the process. During his description of the development of the clavicle and sphenoid, he proposed the term ectochondral bone to refer to extension of endochondral bone into membrane. However, the concept was not widely adopted.

Normally, endochondral bone originates from the perichondrium, a thin soft tissue zone surrounding cartilage. Osteoblasts in the perichondrium secrete osteoid, which leads to the formation of ossification centres. From these ossification centres, the cartilage ossifies as appositional bone.

However, in certain parts of the body, the perichondrium is continuous with surrounding membranes which insert onto the cartilage and lead away from the element. In certain cases, ossification that initiated endochondrally may continue along the shape of the membrane. This is known as ectochondral bone.

While ectochondral ossification initiates from endochondral ossification, it differs in that the bone formed does not conform to the shape of the original cartilage, but rather follows membrane. It differs from intramembranous ossification in that the ossification originates in the cartilage, although it follows the membrane.

Though historically overlooked, a 2025 paper brought more attention to ectochondral ossification, leading to a number of papers utilising the concept.

== Examples ==
Ectochondral ossification allows for the explanation of several unusual developmental features in vertebrates. One such case is that of the alisphenoid; this element initiates as the ala temporalis, a cartilaginous portion of the palatoquadrate. However, as the element develops, ossification invades the spheno-obturator membrane, a dural membrane that encloses the trigeminal ganglion and other ganglia. Ossification spreads outwards from the ala temporalis. This is considered to represent ectochondral ossification. The resulting bone conforms closely to the shape of the adjacent soft tissue (the brain).

Ectochondral ossification also occurs in the orbitosphenoid of primates. This element grows anteriorly by ectochondral ossification of the dura mater surrounding the optic canal.
