= Palatal dentition =

Teeth growing on the roof of the mouth

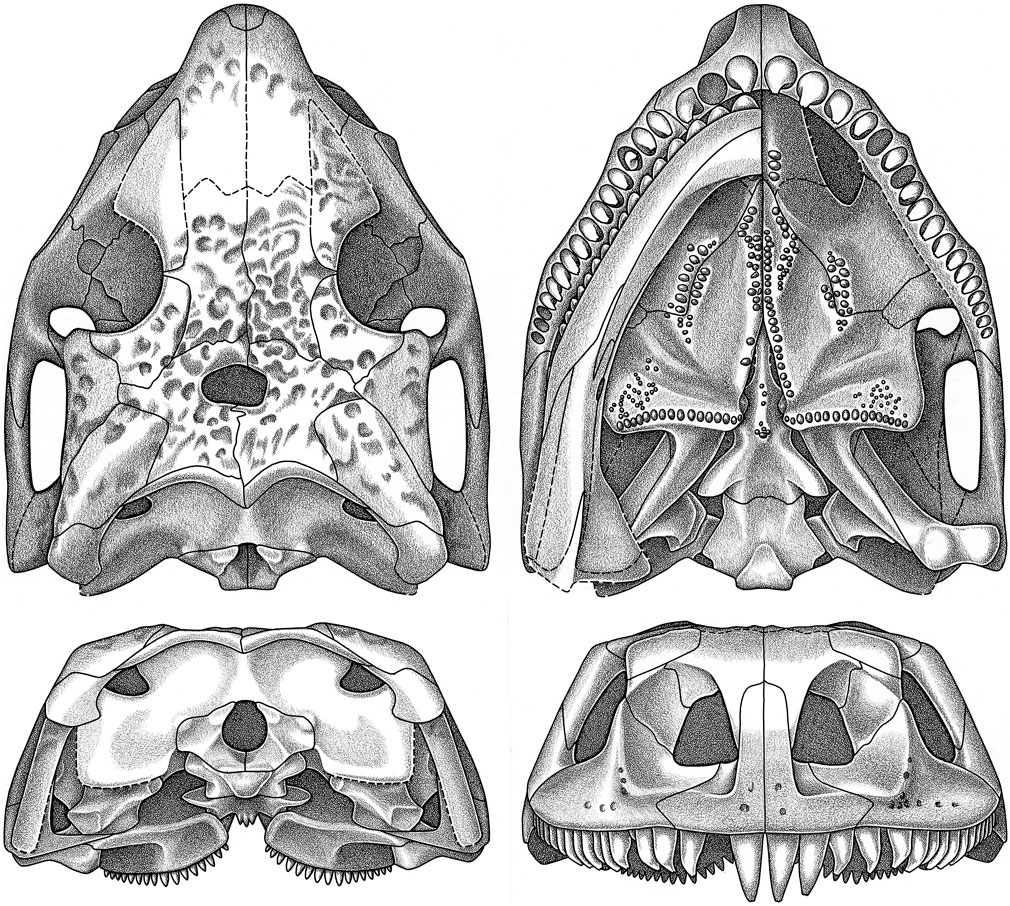
Skull of the early synapsid Cotylorhynchus, showing palatal dentition on the underside of the skull

Palatal dentition refers to teeth that naturally grow on the bones of the roof of the mouth in some fish and tetrapods (as opposed to the "marginal dentition" that grows at the edge of the mouth), either in rows or as a stippled covering referred to as a "shagreen". While ancestrally present in tetrapods, in many living tetrapod groups, including mammals, birds, turtles, and crocodilians, these teeth have been lost, though they are still retained in living lepidosaur reptiles and lissamphibians.

== Description ==
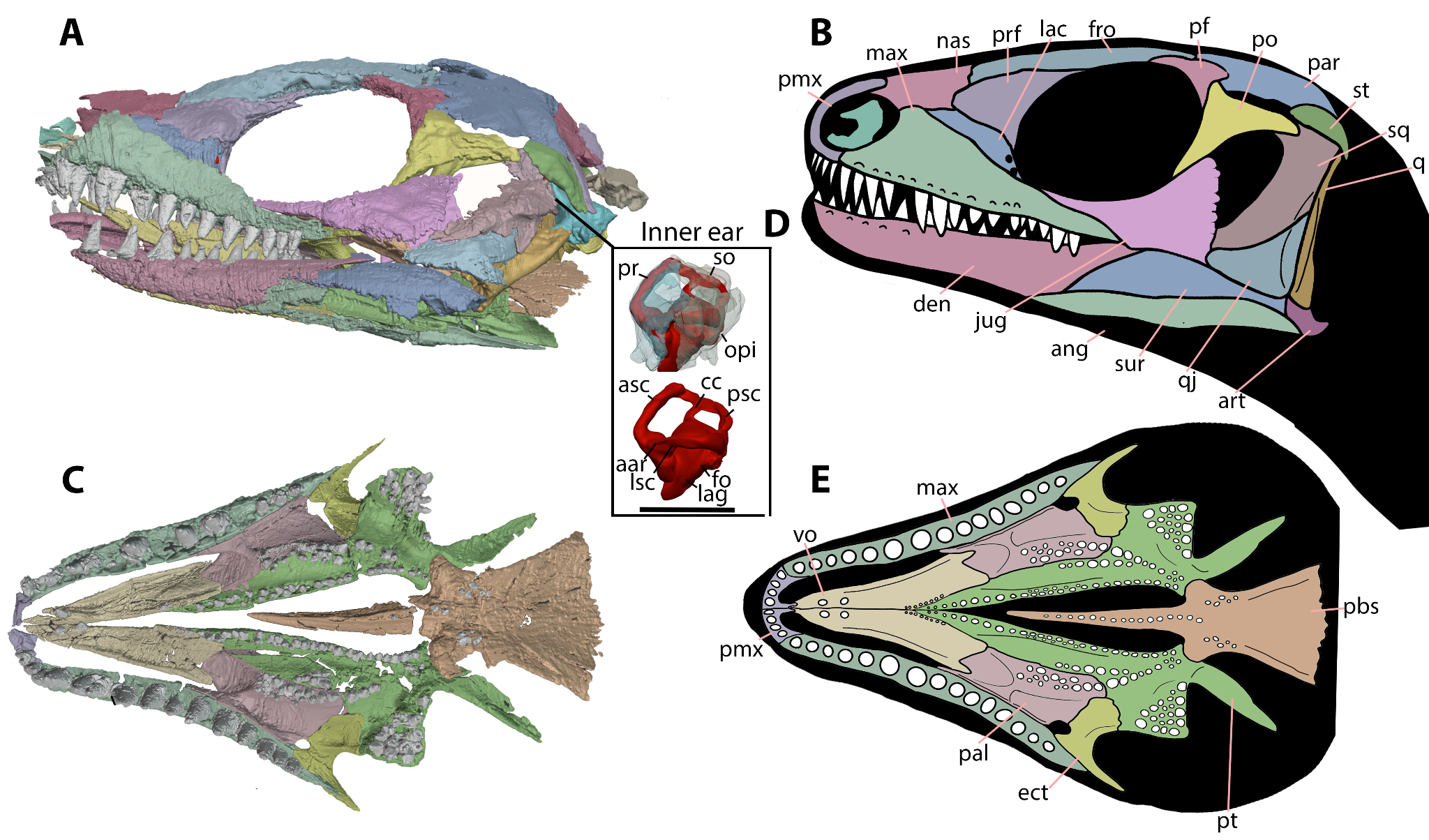
Skull of the early reptile Milleretta rubidgei (Millerettidae), showing the development of palatal dentition on the vomer (labeled vo, tan), palatine (pal, light red), pterygoid (pt, green) and the parabasiphenoid (pbs, orange, formed from the fusion of the basisphenoid and parasphenoid)

In tetrapods, palatine teeth can occur on the vomer, palatine, pterygoid (including the pterygoid flange), ectopterygoid, and parasphenoid. These teeth can either be placed in rows, similar to the marginal dentition on the edge of the mouth, or as a stippled covering referred to as a "shagreen". These teeth vary considerably in size and in some cases can exceed the size of the marginal teeth.

== Occurrence ==
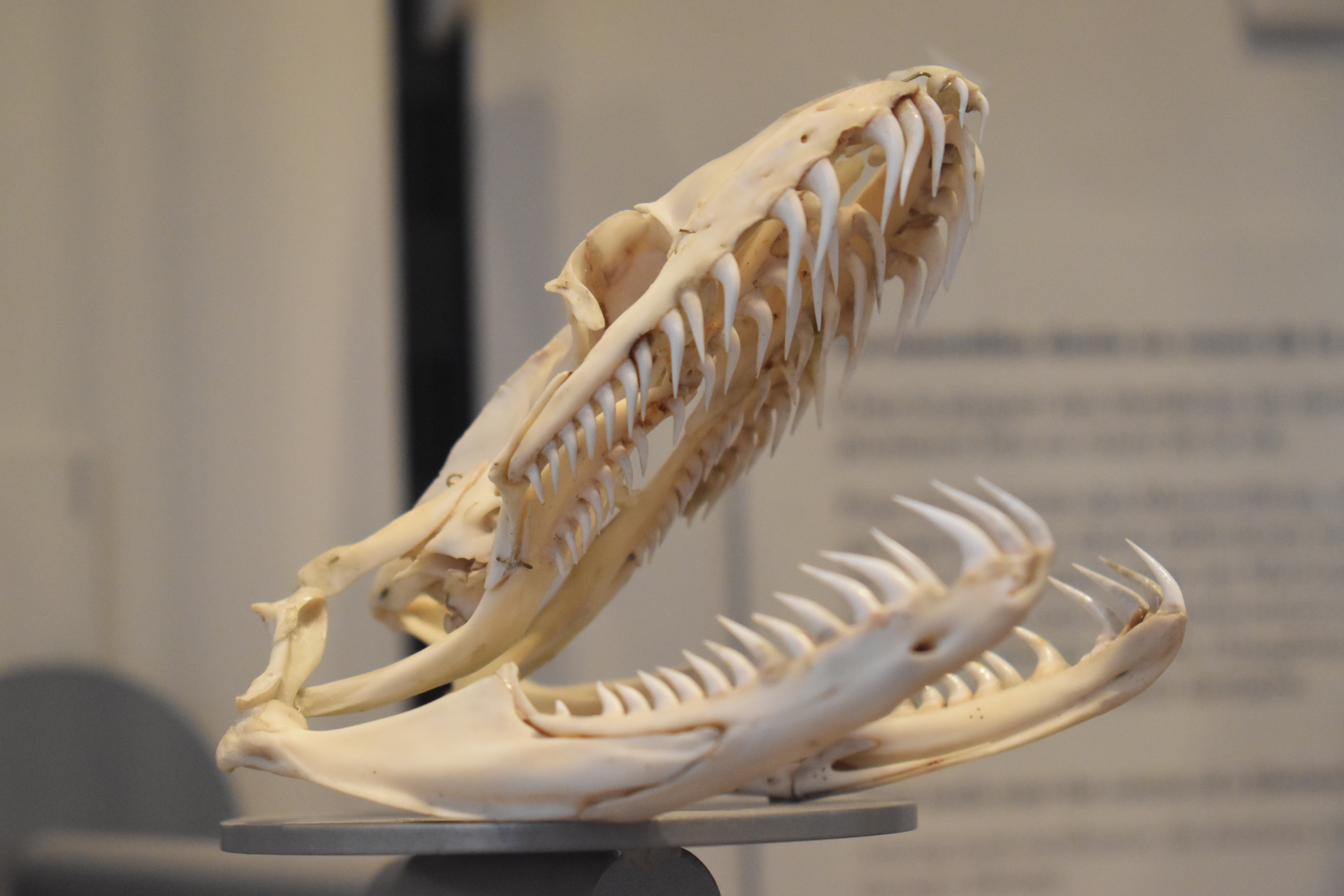
Skull of a snake belonging to the genus Python, showing palatal tooth rows

Palatal teeth are both present in Actinopterygii (ray-finned fish) and Sarcopterygii, and were inherited as an ancestral trait by the last common tetrapod ancestor. Palatal dentition is widespread amongst early tetrapods, though in many lineages of Amniota the palatal dentition became reduced and in some cases entirely lost, the latter including cynodonts (the ancestor of mammals), the ancestors of living turtles (though it is retained in very early stem turtles like Proganochelys), as well as the vast majority of archosaurs (which includes crocodilians, dinosaurs and their bird descendants), though a handful of archosaurs are known to retain a pterygoid tooth row, including the primitive dinosaurs Eodromaeus and Eoraptor, and the primitive pterosaur Eudimorphodon. Loss was not entirely uniform, and some lineages appear to have regained regions of palatal teeth that had been previously ancestrally lost. Lepidosaurian reptiles, including squamates (lizards and snakes) and the tuatara as well as living lissamphibians retain palatal teeth. Some lizard groups have lost palatal teeth, including geckoes, agamids and chameleons. Numerous lineages of frogs have also lost palatal teeth (often alongside the marginal teeth), while they are retained in all salamanders and caecilians.

== Function ==
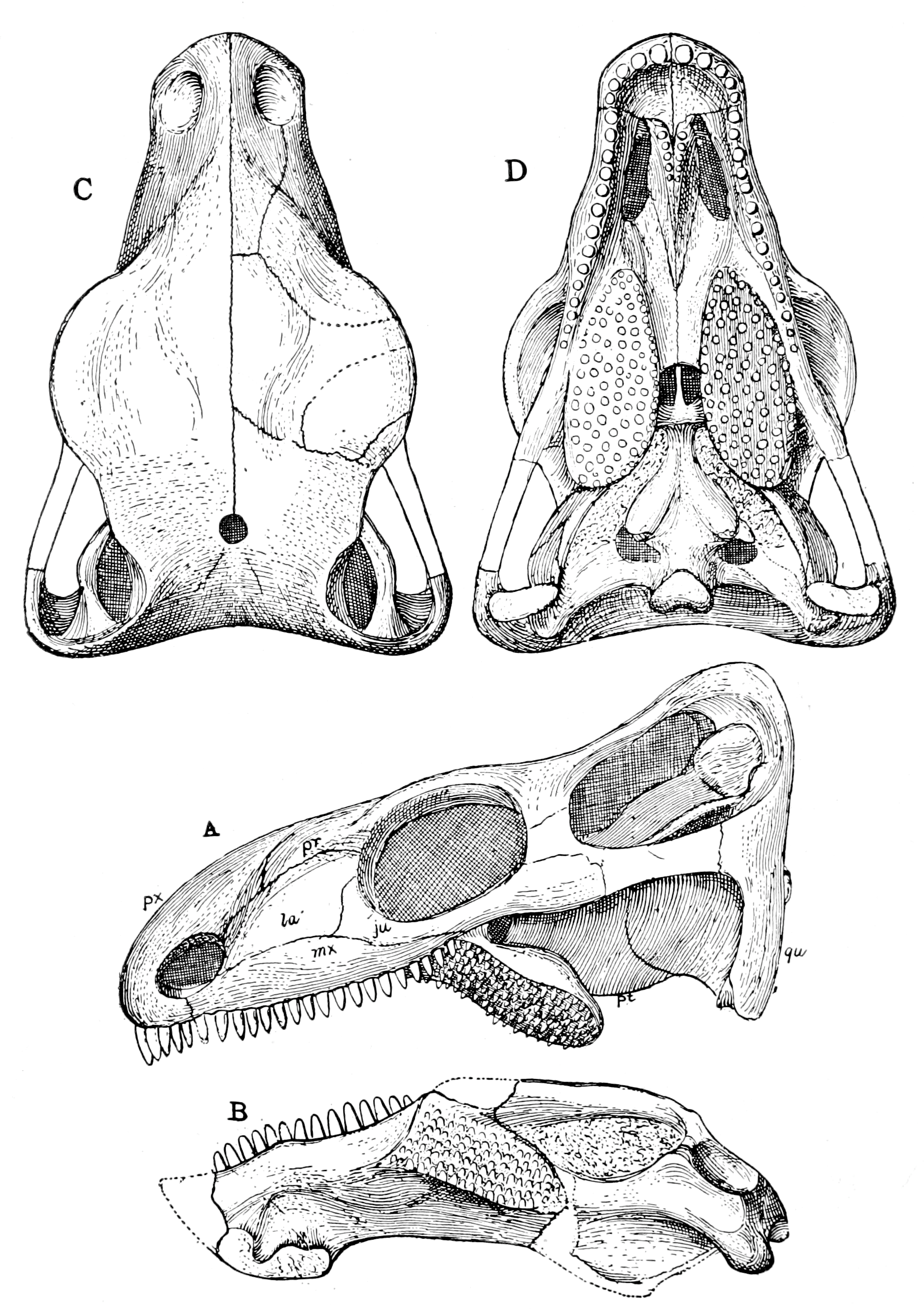
Skull and lower jaw of the edaphosaurid synapsid Edaphosaurus, showing the development of a battery of palatal teeth on the pterygoid, ectopterygoid and palatine bones, along with a corresponding interlocking battery on the lower jaw, used to grind high fiber plant material

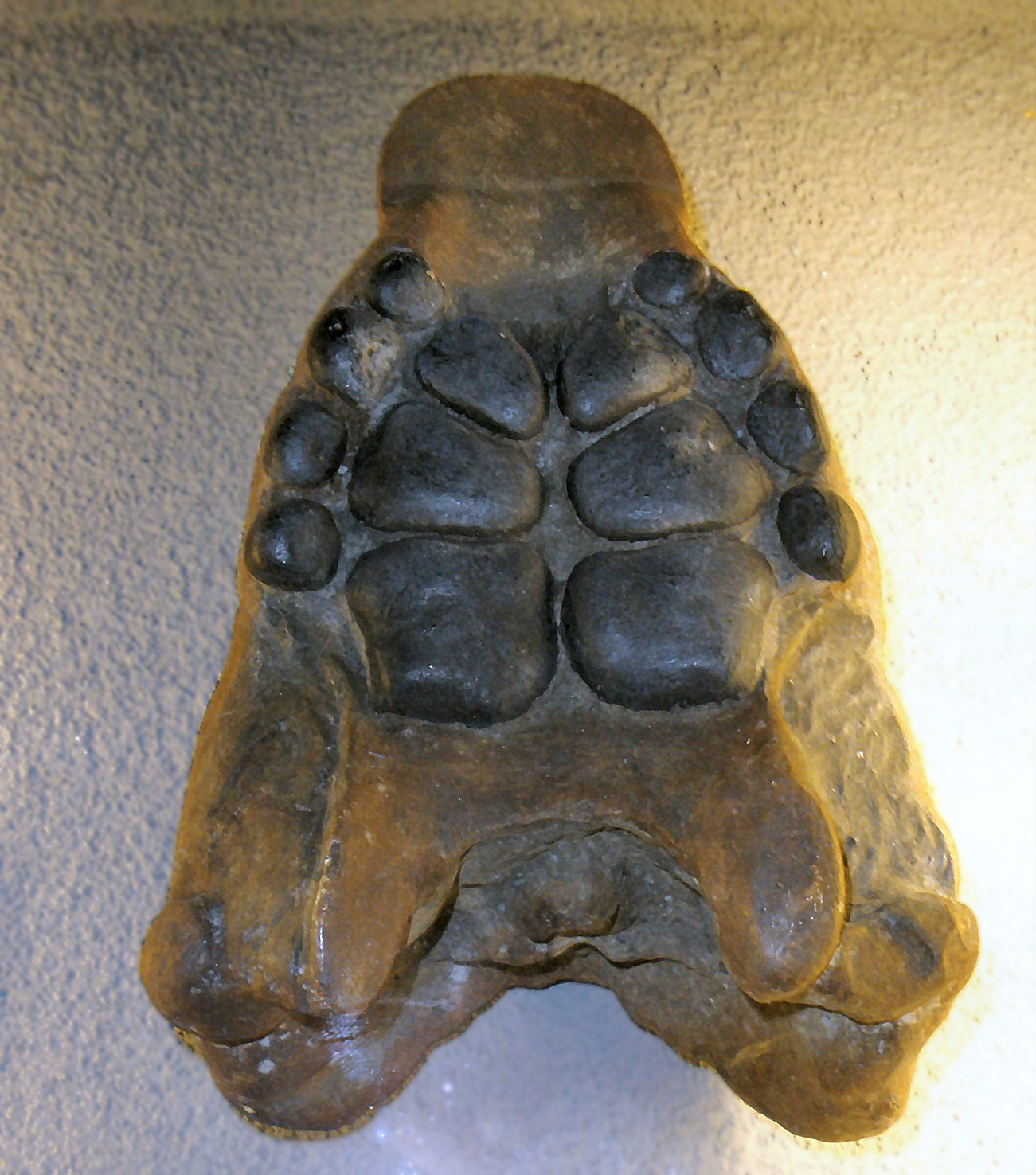
Underside of the skull of the aquatic placodont reptile Placodus, showing modification of palatal teeth into tooth plates used for crushing hard-shelled prey (durophagy)

Palatal dentition is widely thought to help manipulate food in the mouth in combination with the tongue, including by increasing grip, in some cases likely helping to restrain prey. In some lineages their function was modified. In Sphenodontidae (including the tuatara), the tooth row on the palatine bone is enlarged and orientated parallel to the upper marginal tooth row, with the lower marginal tooth row slotting between them, allowing for a shearing bite. In Placodontia, they became plate-like and served to crush prey. In advanced edaphosaurids like Edaphosaurus, the teeth on the palatine, pterygoid and ectopterygoid were present on a raised battery, which interlocked with a similar battery on the lower jaw, which in Edaphosaurus served to grind high-fibre plant material.

In living lungfish, marginal teeth are entirely lost in adults, and the palatal teeth modified into crushing tooth plates. In many snakes, the palatal tooth rows are used in combination with the marginal teeth (or alone in the case of elapids and viperids) to envelop the prey in the mouth and then moved via cranial kinesis to push prey further into the throat (the so-called "pterygoid walk").
