= Basisphenoid =

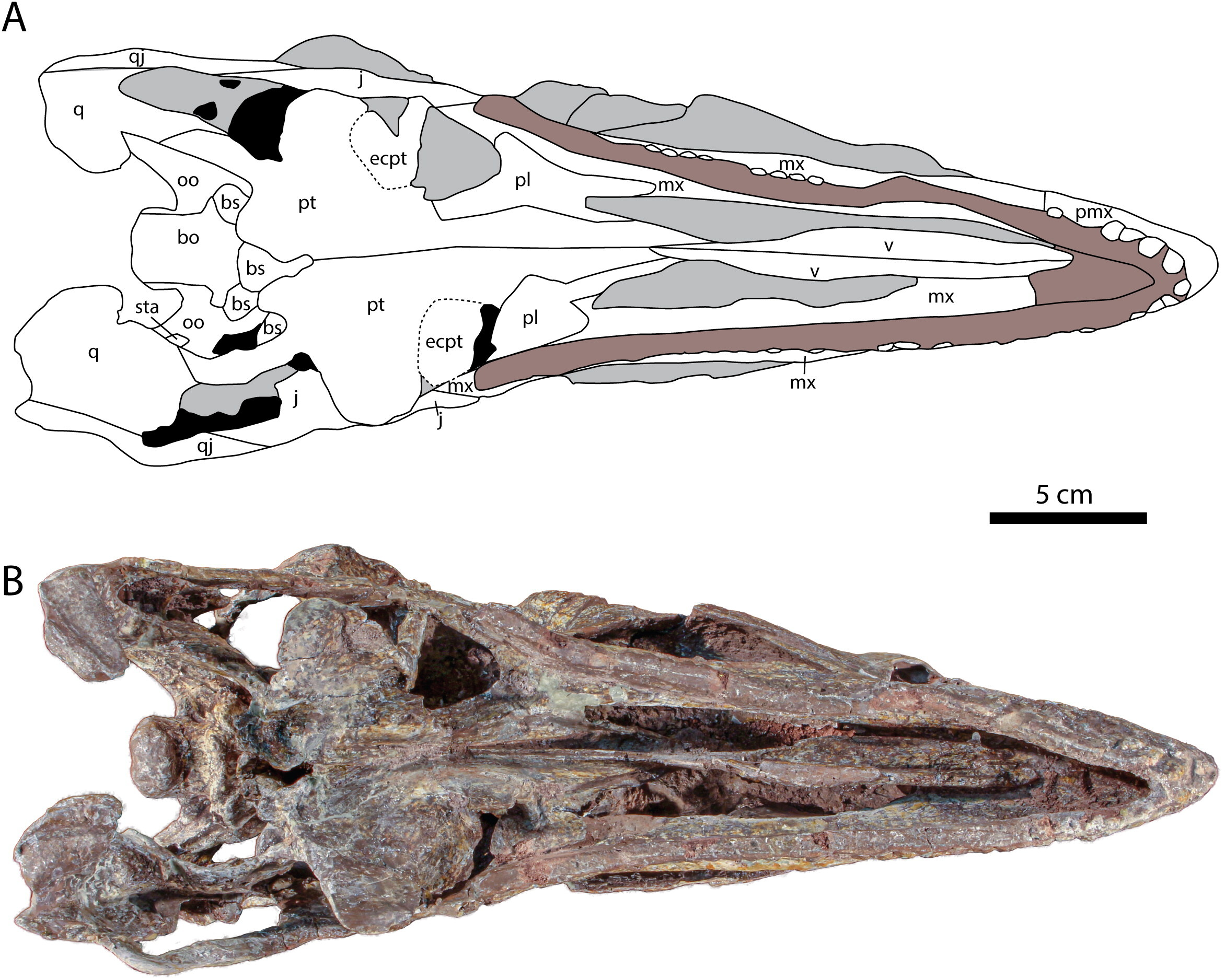
Palatal view of the skull of Plateosaurus. Basisphenoid is labeled as bs.

The basisphenoid is a bone in the skull of vertebrates. It is an unpaired midline element that forms part of the posterior and ventral margin of the braincase; it is typically located anterior to the basioccipital and posterior to the parasphenoid. It ossifies endochondrally and makes up a part of the chondrocranium. The parasphenoid contains the sella turcica, which houses the pituitary gland.

== Evolution ==
The basisphenoid originates as a part of the chondrocranium; among placoderms, chondrichthyans, and early acanthodians it is present as a region of the cartilaginous braincase.

In non-tetrapod osteichthyans, the basisphenoid contains grooves for the spiracle. It is typically absent in teleosts.

In many osteichthyans, including early stegocephalians and amniotes, the basisphenoid fuses to the parasphenoid (of dermal origin) very early in ontogeny; it may also fuse to the sphenethmoid. In such cases, the two bones cannot be distinguished, and fused element is referred to as the parabasisphenoid. Fusion of the two elements is thought to have occurred convergently in tetrapods and in actinopterygians.

In non-mammalian synapsids, the basisphenoid is often covered ventrally by the parasphenoid, to which it may fuse; among cynodonts, it articulates with the prootic to form a portion of the bony labyrinth. The portion of the basisphenoid which forms part of the bony labyrinth is known as the basisphenoid wing.

In mammals, the basisphenoid is much smaller and does not contribute to the bony labyrinth, due to an enlargement of the petrosal to form the promontorium. It is typically fused to the presphenoid, orbitosphenoid, and the alisphenoid (of the splanchnocranium) to form the sphenoid. It makes up the posterior part of the sphenoid base.
