= Presphenoid =

Sagittal section of the skull of the thylacine. Presphenoid is labelled PS.

The presphenoid is an unpaired midline bone present in the skull of many vertebrates. It occurs in the sphenoid region, anterior to the basisphenoid and posterior to the ethmoid region. When present, it may make up some or all of the bony nasal septum. In humans, it fuses with the orbitosphenoids, the alisphenoids, the basisphenoid, and the pterygoids (including the ectopterygoids) to form the sphenoid bone.

== Anatomy ==
The presphenoid contains the optic canals and forms the floor of the anterior cranial fossa. In some animals, such as recumbirostrans, the presphenoid makes up the interorbital septum. In certain mammals, it forms a thin vertical sheet of bone that makes up the bony nasal septum; this is similar to the role played by the mesethmoid in other mammal groups. This has led to a long history of confusion between the two elements.

The presphenoid articulates anteriorly with the ethmoid region - particularly the mesethmoid, if present; the wings of the presphenoid also articulate with the cribriform plate, when present. Posteriorly it articulates with the basisphenoid, and laterally with the orbitosphenoids.

In different taxa, the presphenoid may develop from one or two ossification centers, or may not ossify.

== Evolution ==
The presphenoid is a part of the chondrocranium, and is derived from the ancestral cartilaginous skull of early fishes.

The presphenoid undergoes ossification sporadically in different clades. It is, for instance, ossified in some, but not all, recumbrirostrans. It is thought to be absent in reptiles (including birds).

The presphenoid is believed to be ancestrally present in mammals; it has been lost in xenarthrans, pangolins, horses, and some eulipotyphlans, but is present in most other modern mammals. The presphenoid was historically thought to be absent in humans, but a 2026 developmental study demonstrated its presence.
