= Ophidiosphenoid =

The ophidiosphenoid, sometimes called the "alethinophidian bridge", is a paired bone present in the skull of alethinophidian snakes, where it forms a portion of the braincase. Previously considered to represent the laterosphenoid, it differs from that element in that it ossifies intramembranously, and as such is made of dermal bone.

== Anatomy ==
The ophidiosphenoid occurs lateral to the prootic, to which it may fuse. Unlike the laterosphenoid, which is located anterior to the foramen of the trigeminal nerve, the ophidiosphenoid passes over the foramen, dividing it into anterior and posterior foramina. Also unlike the laterosphenoid, it ossifies as membrane bone, rather than endochondrally. Opinions differ on its status as a distinct bone, and it is sometimes considered to represent a dermal extension of the prootic.

== Evolution ==
The ophidiosphenoid occurs in the clade Alethinophodia, which consists of all extant snakes save for the basal Scolecophidia. The element is considered to have a separate origin from the laterosphenoid of archelosaurs, though same name has been applied to the two elements.

Elements referred to as the ophidiosphenoid have also been reported in the Dibamidae and Amphisbaenia. The feature is thought to have evolved convergently among the groups.
