= Alisphenoid =

Bone in the braincase of mammals

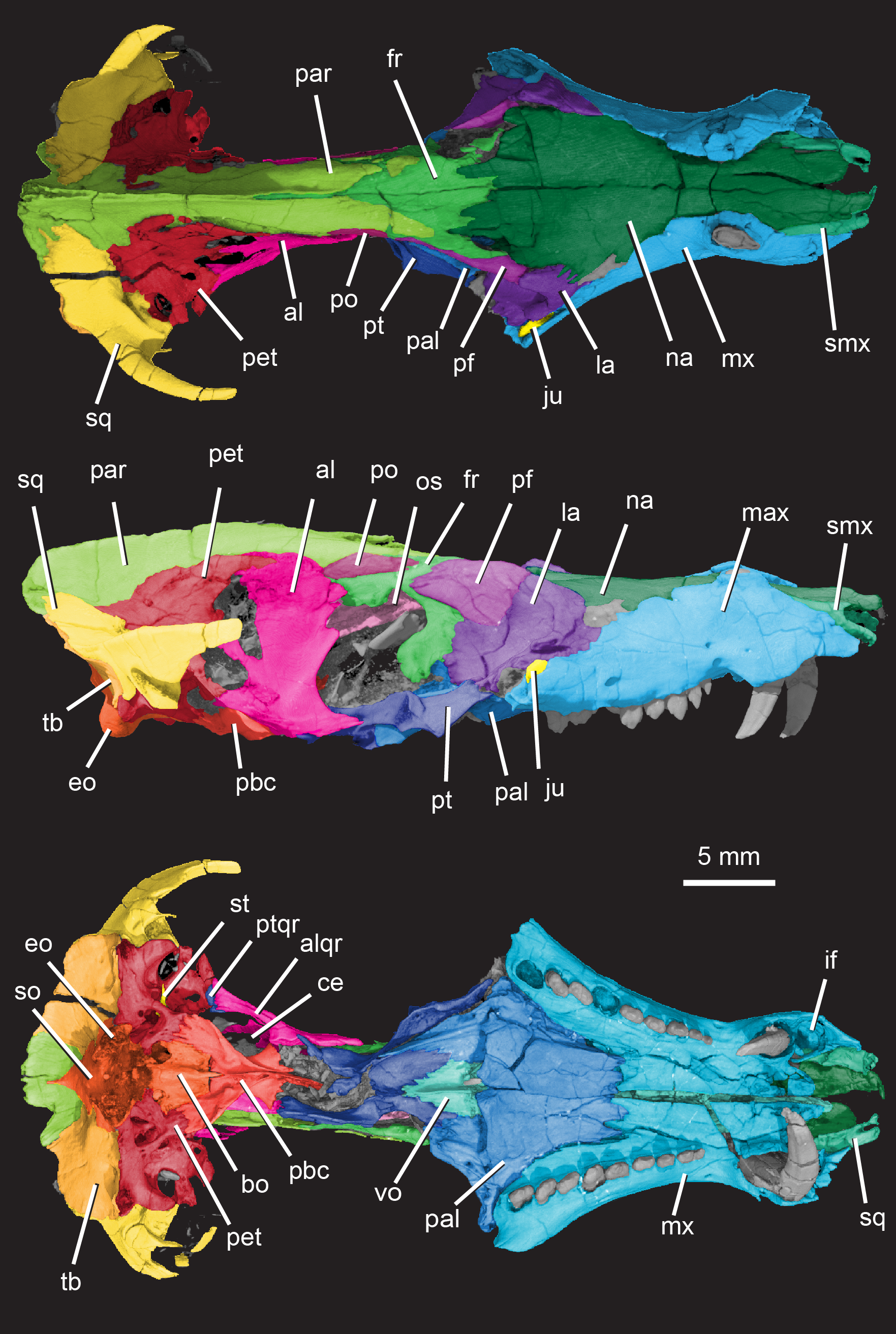
Skull of Pseudotherium. Alisphenoid is shown in pink and labeled al.

The alisphenoid is a paired bone present in the skull of mammals and their closest relatives, which forms part of the lateral wall of the braincase. Unlike most elements of the skull, it has its origins in the palatoquadrate of the first branchial arch, and is a part of the splanchnocranium. In humans, the alisphenoid fuses to a number of other bones to form the sphenoid bone, of which it is the greater wing. It is homologous with the epipterygoid of other animals.

== Anatomy ==
The alisphenoid forms part of the lateral wall of the braincase, and usually taken the form of a fairly large but relatively thin strut of bone on either side of the skull. It contacts the petrosal (specifically the prootic) and sometimes the squamosal on its posterior side; the basisphenoid on its ventral and medial side; roofing bones such as the parietal and/or frontal on its dorsal side; and the orbitosphenoid on its anterior side.

In therian mammals, the alisphenoid generally contains the foramina for the mandibular and maxillary branches of the trigeminal nerve (the foramen ovale and foramen rotundum, respectively). These foramina are linked by the alisphenoid canal. Together with the orbitosphenoid, it borders the superior orbital fissure, i.e., the foramen for the oculomotor, trochlear, and adducens nerves as well as the opthalmic branch of the trigeminal nerve. Among ancestral mammaliaforms, the mandibular and maxillary branches exited posterior to the alisphenoid, without penetrating it; this is also the case among modern monotremes, except that the maxillary nerve passes in front of the alisphenoid in that group. The alisphenoid also contains the foramen spinosum.

=== Alisphenoid strut ===
In some rodents, the alisphenoid strut is an extension of the alisphenoid bone that separates two foramina in the skull, the masticatory–buccinator foramen and the foramen ovale accessorium. The presence or absence of this strut is variable between species, but also within them; some Oryzomyini even have a strut on one side of the skull but lack it on the other side.

== Development ==
Traditionally, the alisphenoid is considered as ossifying endochondrally, possibly with incorporation of an unnamed dermal bone. More recent work suggests a more complicated picture. The central part of the alisphenoid is formed by the ala temporalis, which is generally considered homologous with the ascending process of the palatoquadrate. Additional ossification occurs ectochondrally in the spheno-obturator membrane, a membrane which encloses the trigeminal ganglion and other cranial nerve ganglia. Ossification proceeds sequentially, radiating out from the ala temporalis until the whole alisphenoid is ossified. In some therian mammals, the element seems to also contain dermal bone separate from the ectochondral membrane ossification.

== Evolution ==
The homology of the alisphenoid with bones of other vertebrates was initially uncertain; early studies equated the bone with a superficially similar element in the braincase of some reptiles known as the laterosphenoid (an element for which the homology is also complex). Robert Broom in 1911 proposed instead that the alisphenoid was equivalent with the epipterygoid based upon his comparisons with non-mammalian cynodonts. A 1924 paper by William K. Gregory and G. Kingsley Noble further developed the idea, confirming Broom's homology.

The ancestral mammaliaform is thought to have had a moderately sized alisphenoid; among monotremes the element shrunk, with a greater portion of the brain's sidewall being made up of the lamina obturans of the prootic. Conversely, in therian mammals the alisphenoid became enlarged; the lamina obturans was most likely lost, with the alisphenoid taking over its function. In some therians - namely Virginia opossums, hedgehogs, some bats, mice, and humans, the alisphenoid apparently includes an unnamed dermal bone that fuses to the ectochondral ossification. This is not seen in brush-tailed opossums, treeshrews, other bats, and kangaroos, suggesting that the dermal component of the alisphenoid originated convergently a number of times in Theria.

In some taxa, including humans and cetaceans, the alisphenoid fuses to the orbitosphenoids, basisphenoid, presphenoid, and pterygoids to form the sphenoid.
