= Ethmoidal artery =

Ethmoidal arteries may refer to:

- Anterior ethmoidal artery
- Posterior ethmoidal artery
