= Ectopterygoid =

Skull bone in vertebrates

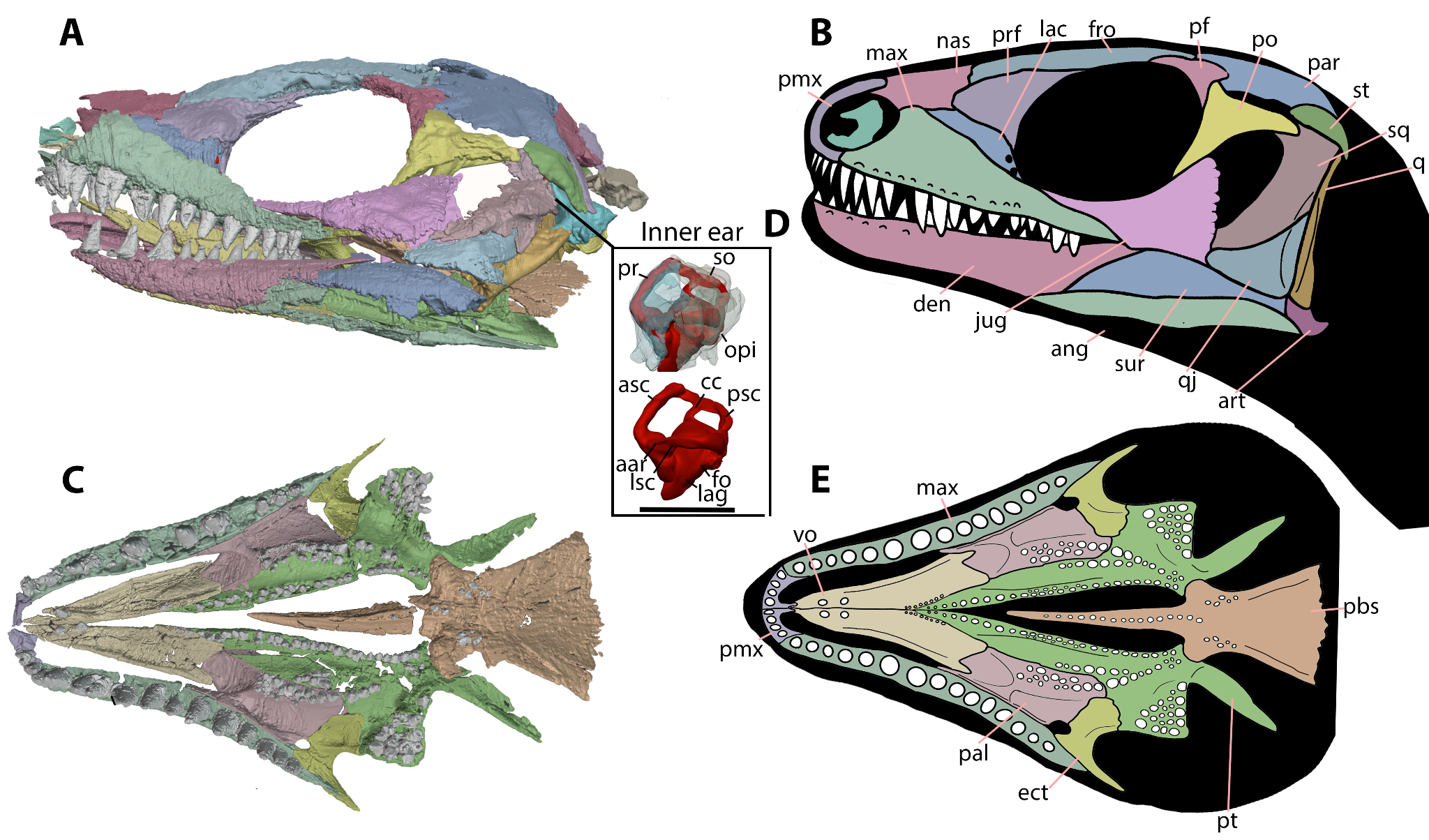
Skull of the early reptile Milleretta rubidgei (Millerettidae), showing ectopterygoid on the underside of the skull (labeled ect, yellow, bottom right)

The ectopterygoid is a skull bone present in bony fish as well as many tetrapods. It forms part of the roof of the mouth, and plesiomorphically serves to connect the palate including the adjacent pterygoid bone with the braincase. It is absent in living birds, but is present in dinosaurs and early birds like Archaeopteryx. While retained in monotremes, it is absent in adult therian mammals, though its remnants can be seen early in foetus development. In many early tetrapods, it bears teeth (palatal dentition), though these are lost in all synapsids and diapsid reptiles.
