= RBP3 =

Protein-coding gene in the species Homo sapiens

Identifiers
- Aliases: RBP3, D10S64, D10S65, D10S66, IRBP, RBPI, RP66, retinol binding protein 3
- External IDs: OMIM: 180290; MGI: 97878; HomoloGene: 9261; GeneCards: RBP3; OMA:RBP3 - orthologs

Gene location (Human)
Chr.	Chromosome 10 (human)
Band	10q11.22	Start	47,348,363 bp
Band	10q11.22	End	47,357,881 bp

Gene location (Mouse)
Chr.	Chromosome 14 (mouse)
Band	14 B|14 20.8 cM	Start	33,675,960 bp
Band	14 B|14 20.8 cM	End	33,686,173 bp
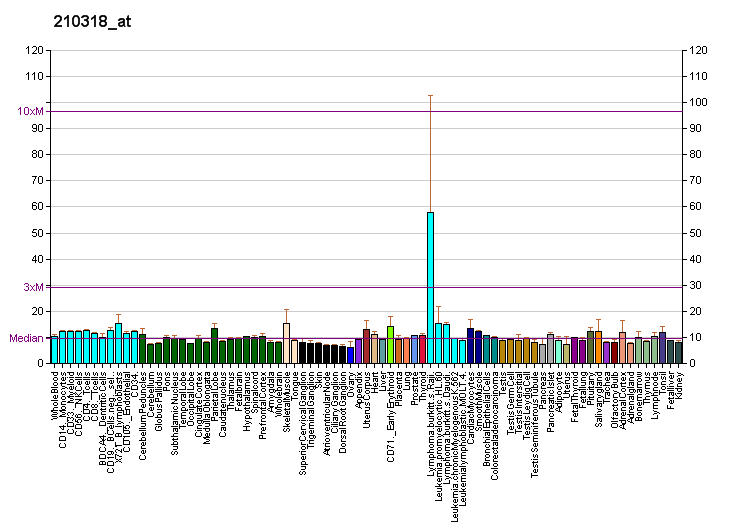
RNA expression pattern
Bgee	Human / Mouse (ortholog); Top expressed in: testicle; retinal pigment epithelium; Epithelium of choroid plexus; hippocampal formation; hippocampus proper; mesencephalon; frontal lobe; Cortex of frontal lobe; prefrontal cortex; substantia nigra / Top expressed in: neural layer of retina; epithelium of lens; retinal pigment epithelium; pineal gland; outer nuclear layer; right ventricle; embryo; lumbar subsegment of spinal cord; iris; embryo; More reference expression data
BioGPS	More reference expression data
Gene ontology
Molecular function	serine-type peptidase activity; retinoid binding; retinal binding; retinol binding
Cellular component	extracellular vesicle; extracellular region; interphotoreceptor matrix; extracellular space; cone matrix sheath
Biological process	proteolysis; retinoid metabolic process; lipid metabolism; visual perception; transport
Sources:Amigo / QuickGO
Orthologs
Species	Human	Mouse
Entrez	5949	19661
Ensembl	ENSG00000265203	ENSMUSG00000041534
UniProt	P10745	P49194
RefSeq (mRNA)	NM_002900	NM_015745
RefSeq (protein)	NP_002891	NP_056560
Location (UCSC)	Chr 10: 47.35 – 47.36 Mb	Chr 14: 33.68 – 33.69 Mb
PubMed search
- Wikidata
View/Edit Human	View/Edit Mouse

Retinol-binding protein 3, interstitial (RBP3), also known as interphotoreceptor retinoid-binding protein (IRBP), is a protein that in humans is encoded by the RBP3 gene. RBP3 orthologs have been identified in most eutherians except tenrecs and armadillos. A horizontal gene transfer from bacteria has been proposed to explain the evolution of the eye in chordates.

== Function ==
The inter-photoreceptor retinoid-binding protein is a large glycoprotein known to bind retinoids and found primarily in the interphotoreceptor matrix of the retina between the retinal pigment epithelium (RPE) and the photoreceptor cells. It is thought to transport retinoids between the RPE and the photoreceptors, a critical role in the visual process.

== Gene ==
The human IRBP gene is approximately 9.5 kbp in length and consists of four exons separated by three introns. The introns are 1.6-1.9 kbp long. The gene is transcribed by photoreceptor and retinoblastoma cells into an approximately 4.3-kilobase mRNA that is translated and processed into a glycosylated protein of 135,000 Da.

== Structure ==
The amino acid sequence of human IRBP can be divided into four contiguous homology domains with 33-38% identity, suggesting a series of gene duplication events. In the gene, the boundaries of these domains are not defined by exon-intron junctions, as might have been expected. The first three homology domains and part of the fourth are all encoded by the first large exon, which is 3,180 base pairs long. The remainder of the fourth domain is encoded in the last three exons, which are 191, 143, and approximately 740 base pairs long, respectively.

== Application ==
The rbp3 gene is commonly used in animals as a nuclear DNA phylogenetic marker. The exon 1 has first been used in a pioneer study to provide evidence for monophyly of Chiroptera. Then, it has been used to infer the phylogeny of placental mammal orders, and of the major clades of Rodentia, Macroscelidea, and Primates. RBP3 is also useful at lower taxonomic levels, e.g., in muroid rodents and Malagasy primates, at the phylogeography level in Geomys and Apodemus rodents, and even for carnivora species identification purposes.

Note that the RBP3 intron 1 has also been used to investigate the platyrrhine primates phylogenetics.
