= Neomorph (anatomy) =

In comparative anatomy, a neomorph is an anatomical structure in a clade of organisms which has no equivalent evolutionary equivalent in ancestral taxa. Examples of neomorphs include the palpebral bones of ornithischian dinosaurs and the calcar in bats.
