= Dermal bone =

Bony structure derived from intramembranous ossification

A dermal bone or investing bone or membrane bone is a bony structure derived from intramembranous ossification forming components of the vertebrate skeleton, including much of the skull, jaws, gill covers, shoulder girdle, fin rays (lepidotrichia), and the shells of turtles and armadillos. In contrast to endochondral bone, dermal bone does not have a cartilage precursor, and it is often ornamented. Dermal bone is formed within the dermis and grows by accretion only – the outer portion of the bone is deposited by osteoblasts.

The function of some dermal bone is conserved throughout vertebrates, although there is variation in shape and in the number of bones in the skull roof and postcranial structures. In bony fish, dermal bone is found in the fin rays and scales. A special example of dermal bone is the clavicle. Some of the dermal bone functions regard biomechanical aspects such as protection against predators. The dermal bones are also argued to be involved in ecophysiological implications such as the heat transfers between the body and the surrounding environment when basking (seen in crocodilians) as well as in bone respiratory acidosis buffering during prolonged apnea (seen in both crocodilians and turtles). These ecophysiological functions rely on the set-up of a blood vessel network within and straight above the dermal bones.
