= Chondrocranium =

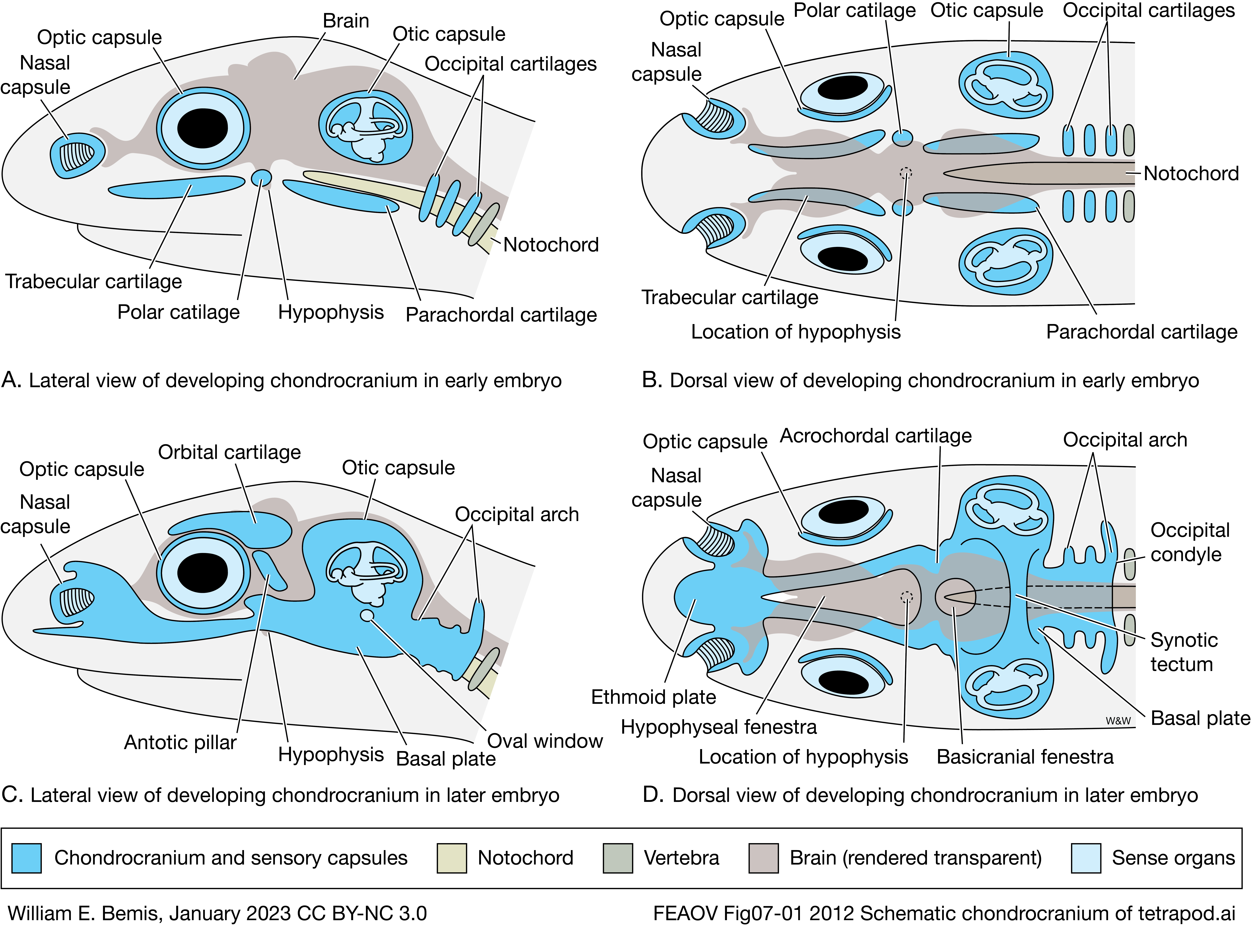

Details

Identifiers
- Latin: chondrocranium
- TA98: A02.1.00.009
- TA2: 357
- FMA: 76621

The chondrocranium (or cartilaginous neurocranium) is the primitive cartilaginous skeletal structure of the fetal skull that grows to envelop the rapidly growing embryonic brain; in osteology, the term chondrocranium also refers to endochondral bones that originate from the ancestral cartilaginous structure. It, together with the splanchnocranium and the dermatocranium, makes up the skull.

Embryologically, the chondrocranium represents the basal cranial structure, and lays the base for the formation of the endocranium.

== Development ==
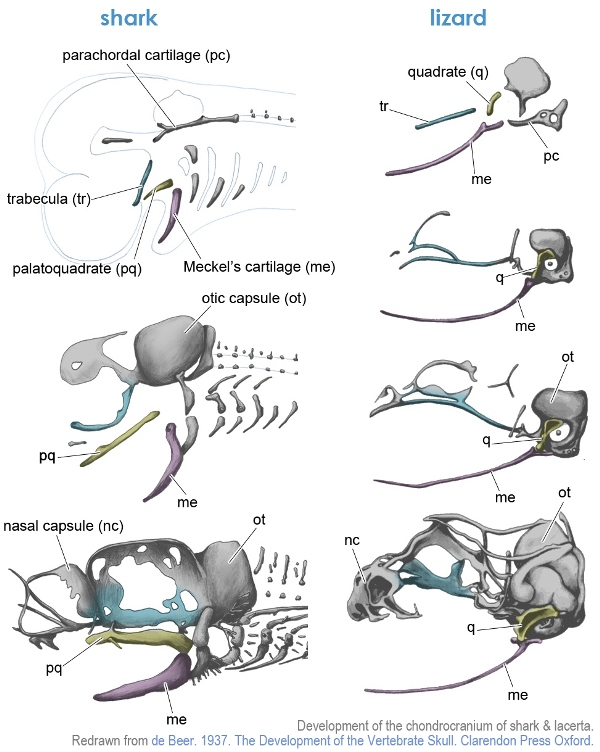
Development of the chondrocranium (and parts of the splanchnocranium) in the shark (left) and lizard (right).

Early in development, the chondrocranium is formed only from cartilage, which originates at multiple different points around the future skull. These are:

- The occipital cartilages, which develop from somites and condense into the occipital arch;
- The otic capsule, which contains the inner ear;
- The parachordal cartilages, which fuse to form the basal plate.
- The polar cartilage;
- The optic capsule, which contains the eye;
- The nasal capsule, which contains the nose; and
- The trabecular cartilages or trabeculae, which fuse to form the ethmoid plate.

Of these, the nasal capsule, trabeculae, and possibly otic capsules develop from neural crest, while the remaining cartilages develop from mesodermal mesenchyme.

In osteichthyans, some or all parts of the cartilages may later ossify.

In humans, the chondrocranium begins forming at 28 days from mesenchymal condensations and is fully formed between week 7 and 9 of fetal development. While the majority of the chondrocranium is succeeded by the bony skull, some components do persist into adulthood.

== Evolution ==
The chondrocranium is the earliest portion of the vertebrate skull to have evolved; in cartilaginous fishes (e.g. sharks and rays) and agnathans (e.g. lampreys and hagfish), the chondrocranium persists throughout life. In most osteichthyans, much of the chondrocranium becomes ossified into a number of distinct skeletal elements.

== Divisions ==
The portion of the chondrocranium that is associated with the notochord is termed the chordal chondrocranium and is formed from mesodermally-derived mesenchyme. The more rostral portion of the chondrocranium that lie anterior to the notochord constitutes the prechordal chondrocranium, and is derived primarily from neural crest-derived mesenchyme.

=== Occipital region ===
The bones of the occipital region make up the posterior portion of the skull, and are responsible for attaching it to the spinal column. In mammals, they are fused into one bone, the occipital.

- Supraoccipital
- Exoccipital
- Basioccipital

=== Ethmoid region ===
The elements of the ethmoid region are ossified in teleost fishes as well as in mammals, but are typically unossified in amphibians and sauropsids. They make up part of the nasal capsule, and in mammals are known as the nasal conchae. They also form the nasal septal cartilage and the interorbital septum. Among mammals, a number of elements - namely the mesethmoid, ectethmoids, and cribriform plate - fuse to form the ethmoid.

- Ethmoturbinal
- Nasoturbinal
- Maxilloturbinal
- Mesethmoid
- Ectethmoid
- Cribriform plate
- Rostral bone (in pigs)

=== Sphenoid region ===
Bones of the sphenoid region largely form the floor of the braincase. In mammals, bones of this region often fuse with the alisphenoid to form the sphenoid bone.

- Sphenethmoid
- Orbitosphenoid
- Basisphenoid
- Presphenoid
- Laterosphenoid (Pleurosphenoid) - present only in archosauriformes.

=== Periotic region ===
Bones of the periotic region enclose the inner ear. In mammals, the periotic bones are fused into a single bone known as the petrosal.

- Prootic
- Epiotic
- Opisthotic
- Sphenotic
- Supraotic

== See also ==
- Dermal bone
- Dermatocranium
- Splanchnocranium
