= Endocranium =

Lower and inner parts of the skull

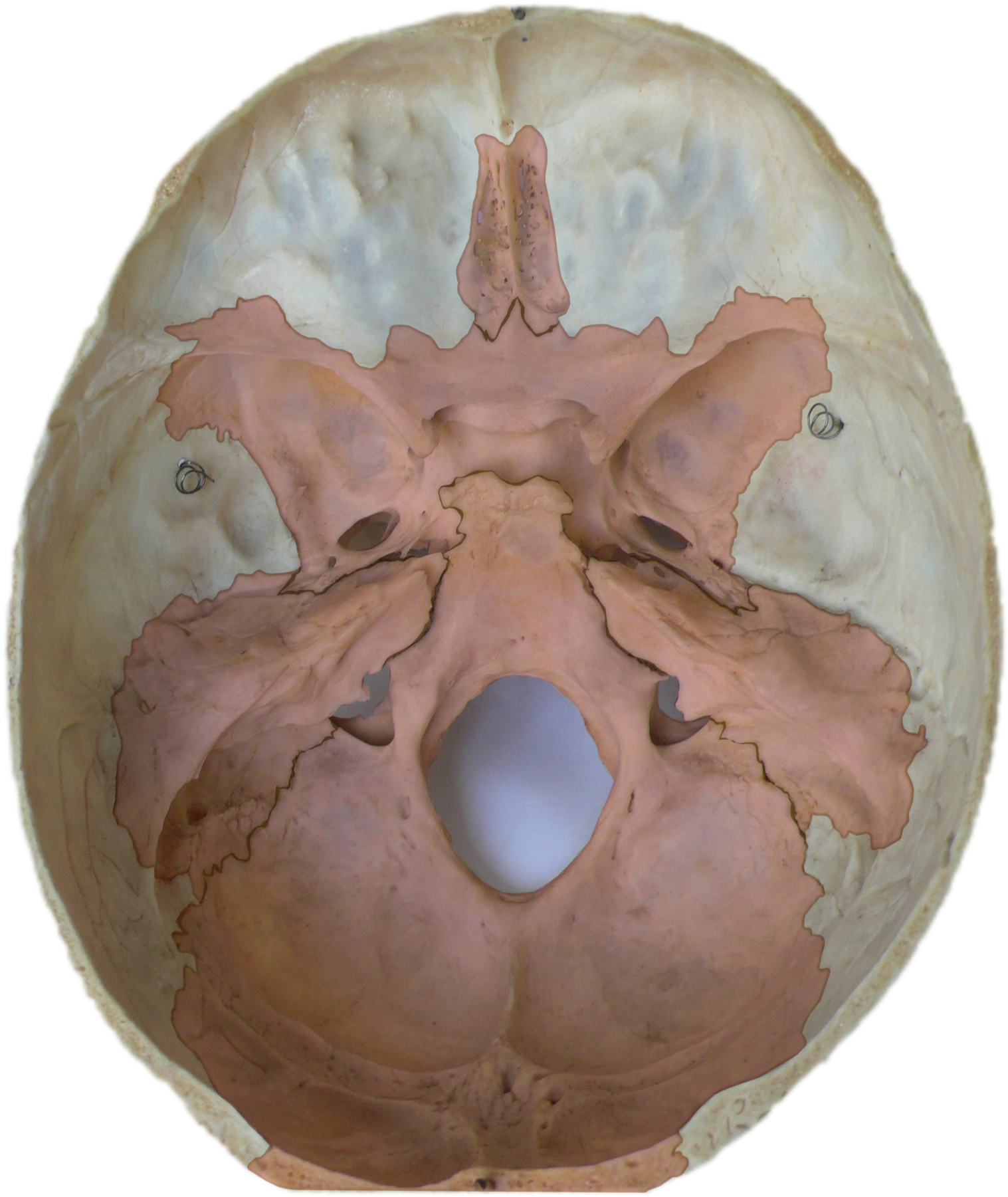
- Human endocranium (pink fields), inner surface.

Details

Identifiers
- Latin: endocranium

The endocranium in comparative anatomy is a part of the skull base in vertebrates and it represents the basal, inner part of the cranium. The term is also applied to the outer layer of the dura mater in human anatomy.

== Structure ==
Structurally, the endocranium consists of a boxlike shape, open at the top. The posterior margin exhibits the foramen magnum, an opening for the spinal cord. The floor of the endocranium has several paired openings for the cranial nerves, and the anterior margin holds a spongy construction, allowing for the external nasal nerves to pass through. All bones of the structure derive from the cranial neural crest during fetal development.

=== Endocranial elements in humans ===
In humans and other mammals, the endocranium forms during fetal development as a cartilaginous neurocranium, that ossifies from several centers. Several of these bones merge, and in the adult primates (including humans), the endocranium is composed of only five bony elements (from front to back):

- The ethmoid bone, lying behind the nose.
- The sphenoid bone, underlying the forward portion of the brain
- Paired petrous part of the temporal bones, containing the inner ear structures
- Most of the occipital bone, surrounding the foramen magnum

Sexual dimorphism in the prenatal period is observed, for example in the area of the anterior cranial fossa: the angle of the anterior fossa in male fetuses is greater than in female fetuses.

== Other animals ==
=== Endocranial components in other tetrapods ===
The endocranium in mammals is much reduced in relative size and number of bones compared to the condition in the ancestral land vertebrates, though the occipital bone occur as one or more stout bony elements in several mammal groups. The occipital bone is also found as several bony elements in birds and reptiles, while the skull of modern amphibians is generally reduced with a simplified endocranium. The skull of early labyrinthodonts were rather complex, and contained in addition to the bones mentioned above several small cartilaginous components that are fused to temporal and occipital bones in mammals:

- Paired prootic and opisthotic bones above each fenestra ovalis, fused to the petrous part of the temporal bones in mammals.
- Paired exoccipital bones medially and a single basioccipital bone below the foramen magnum, part of the occipital bone in mammals.

=== The endocranium in fish ===
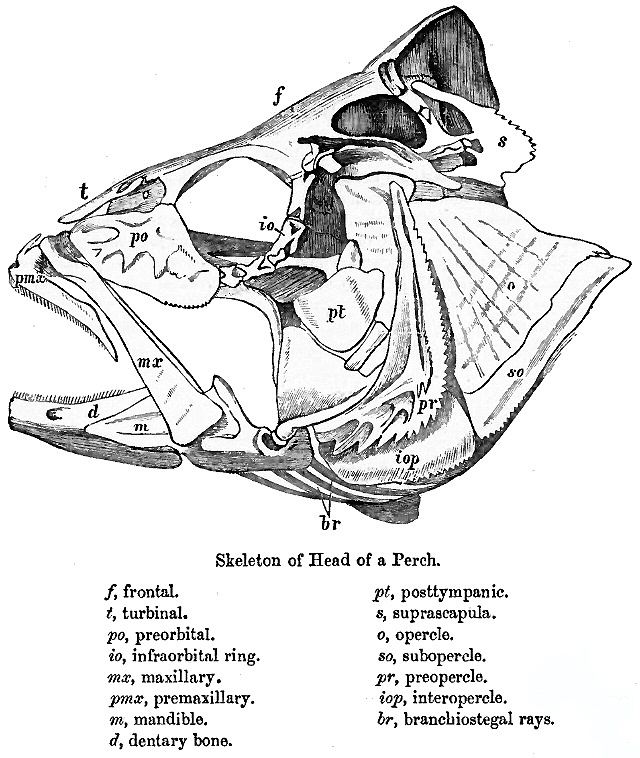
The loosely connected skull of a perch.

While the endocranium is an integral part of the skull in mammals, birds and reptiles, its connection to the roofing parts of the skull is more loose in the lower vertebrates. In Agnathans and Chondrichthyes, the skull lacks the skull roof dermal elements, their whole cranium being composed of the endocranium, properly called a chondrocranium. In most Osteichthyes, the skull is only loosely joined, and the endocranial elements do not form a unit with the skull roof.

=== Fossilization ===
An endocast or endocranial cast is a cast made of the mold formed by the impression the brain makes on the inside of the neurocranium (braincase), providing a replica of the brain with most of the details of its outer surface. Endocasts can also form naturally, when sediments fill the empty skull, after which the skull is destroyed and the cast fossilized. Scientists are increasingly utilizing computerized tomography scanning technology to create digital endocasts without damaging valuable specimens. This gives a 3D representation of the brain. Brain size and complexity can then be determined.

Endocasts were used for looking at the brains of Homo sapiens to find hemispheric specialization.

== See also ==
- Dermatocranium
- Splanchnocranium
