= Otoccipital =

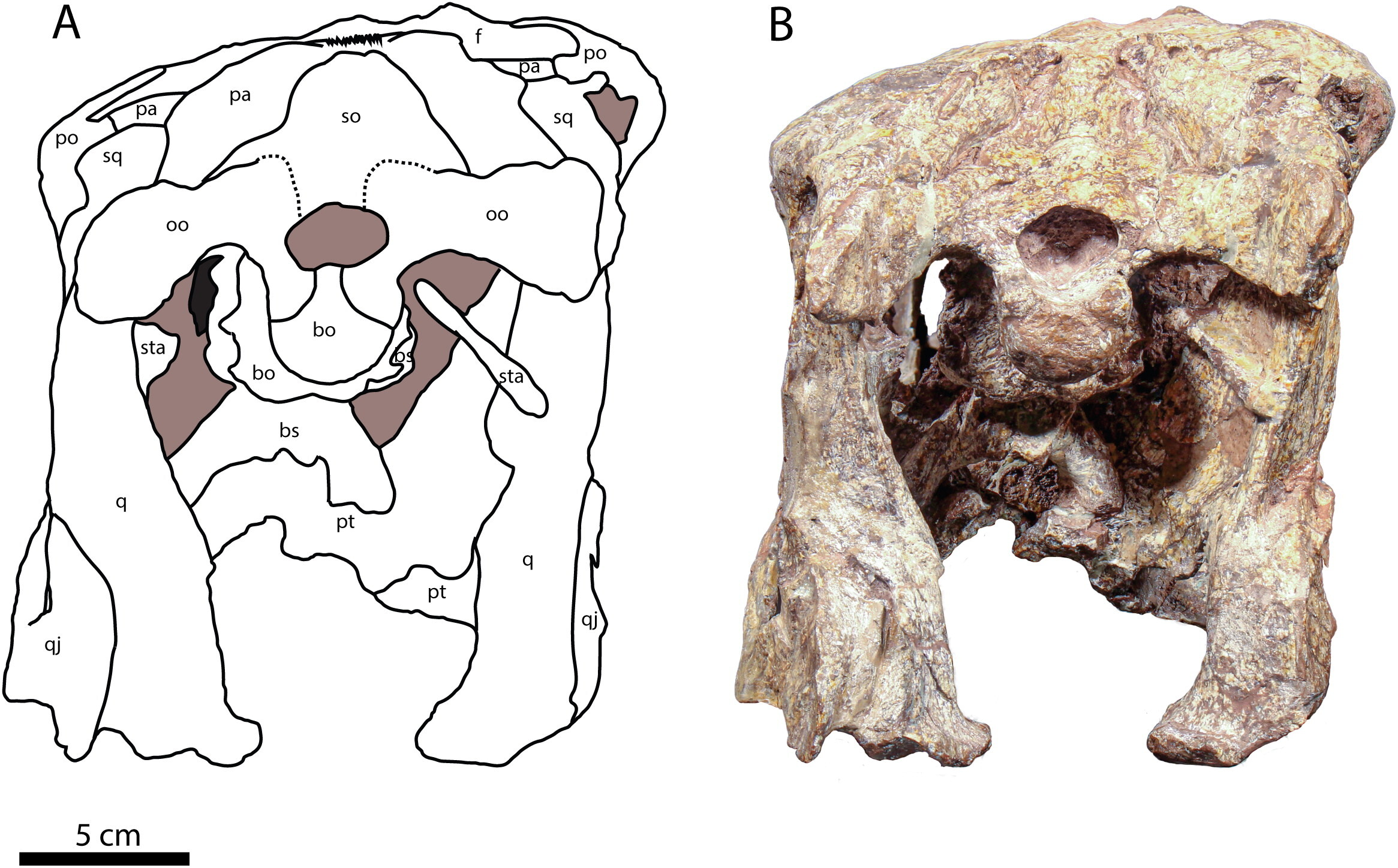
Skull of Plateosaurus trossingensis in posterior view. Otoccipital is labeled oo.

The otoccipital is a composite bone present in the rear of the skull of some vertebrates. It is formed from the fusion of the exoccipital and the opisthotic, and is also known as the exoccipital–opisthotic complex. It forms the rear of the braincase and partial wall of the otic capsule. The fusion is present in most diapsids, but the ancestral condition for crown-group reptiles is probably an unfused exoccipital and opisthotic, with the fused state arising independently in lepidosaurs and archosaurs. In the tuatara, the exoccipitals and opisthotics are separate elements in juveniles but can become fused in adults. In squamates, they are generally fused by the time they hatch, with the exception of dibamids and rare occurrences in other lizards. The exoccipital and opisthotic are indistinguishably fused in nearly all archosaurs by the time they hatch, though it is sometimes possible to discern the boundary between the two elements by a difference in bone texture. Euparkeria, an archosauriform closely related to archosaurs, retains a separate exoccipital and opisthotic. In most non-archosauriform archosauromorphs, the braincase is unfused, with separate opisthotics and exoccipitals. In the embryonic development of the Nile crocodile, the exoccipital component of the otoccipital begins ossifying before the opisthotic component does.

The otoccipitals are complex elements that form the lateral borders of the foramen magnum and contain the foramina for the glossopharyngeal, vagus, accessory, and hypoglossal nerves.
