= Cranial vault =

Space in the skull occupied by the brain

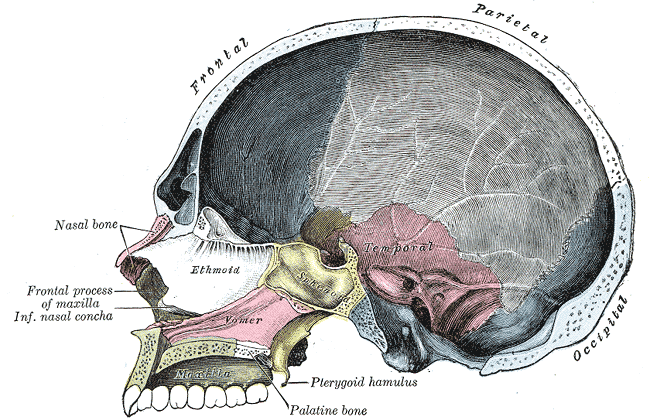
Sagittal section of a human skull, showing the cranial vault

The cranial vault is the space in the skull within the neurocranium, occupied by the brain.

== Development ==
In humans, the cranial vault is imperfectly composed in newborns, to allow the large human head to pass through the birth canal. During birth, the various bones, connected only by cartilage and ligaments, will move relatively to each other. The open portion between the major bones of the upper part of the vault, called fontanelles, normally remain soft up to two years after birth.

As the fontanelles close, the vault loses some of its plasticity. The sutures between the bones remain until 30 to 40 years of age, allowing for growth of the brain. Cranial vault size is directly proportional to skull size and is developed early.

The size and shape of the brain and the surrounding vault remain quite plastic as the brain grows in childhood. In several ancient societies, head shape was altered for aesthetic or religious reasons by binding cloth or boards tightly around the head during infancy. It is not known whether such artificial cranial deformation has an effect in brain power.

== Evolution ==
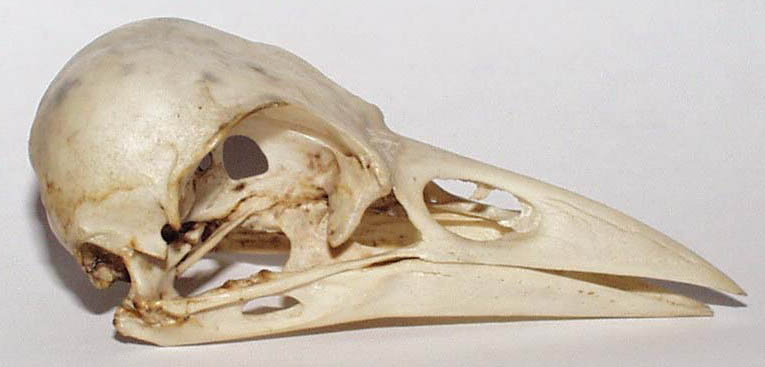
Skull of carrion crow, showing the enlarged vault found in birds.

The cranial vault is composed of the endocranium forming the basal parts, topped by the skull roof in land vertebrates.

In fishes, no distinct cranial vault as such exists. Instead, the skull is composed of loosely jointed bones. The cranial vault as a distinct unit arose with the fusion of the skull roof and the endocranium on the early Labyrinthodonts. In amphibians and reptiles, the vault is rather small and inconspicuous, only forming proper vaults in mammals and birds.

== See also ==
- Skull
- Craniometry
- Phrenology
