= Tectorial membrane of atlanto-axial joint =

Ligament in the spinal canal in the head joint area

Tectorial membrane (axis)
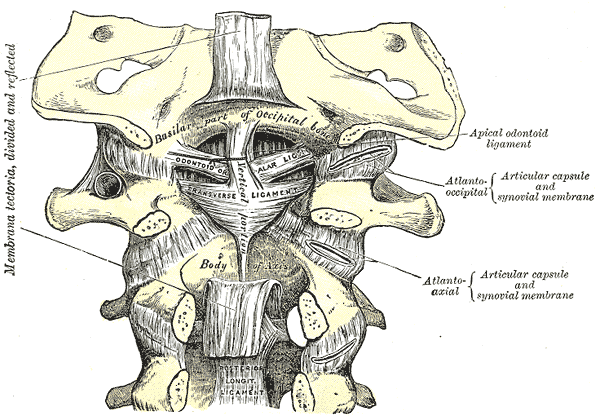
- Membrana tectoria, transverse, and alar ligaments. (Membrana tectoria labeled at far left.)

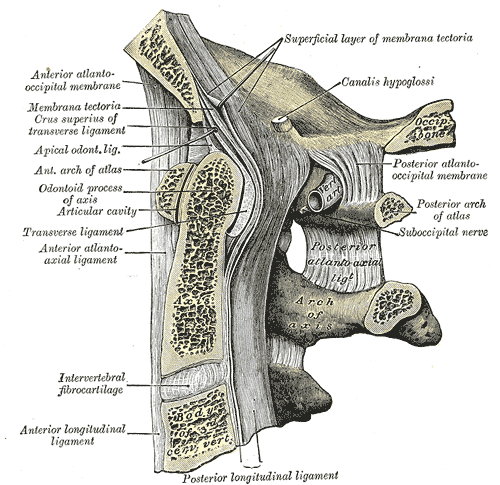
- Median sagittal section through the occipital bone and first three cervical vertebræ. (Membrana tectoria labeled at left, second from top.)

Details

Identifiers
- Latin: membrana tectoria
- TA98: A03.2.04.007
- TA2: 1704
- FMA: 25013

The tectorial membrane of atlanto-axial joint (occipitoaxial ligaments) is a tough membrane/broad, strong band representing the superior-ward prolongation of the posterior longitudinal ligament (the two being continuous).

It attaches inferiorly onto (the posterior aspect of) the body of axis. It broadens superiorly. Superiorly, the membrane extends deep to the median atlanto-axial joint and its associated ligaments, then through the foramen magnum into the cranial cavity where it ends by attaching onto the basilar part of occipital bone superior to the foramen magnum.

== Anatomy ==
The membrane broadens superiorly.

=== Structure ===
The membrane consists of two laminae - superficial and deep.

The superficial lamina broadens superiorly before attaching onto the superior/internal surface of the basilar part of occipital bone superior to the foramen magnum, here blending with the cranial dura mater.

The deep lamina consists of a strong medial band which extends superiorly to the foramen magnum, and of two lateral bands which superiorly reach and blend with the articular capsules of the atlanto-occipital joint.

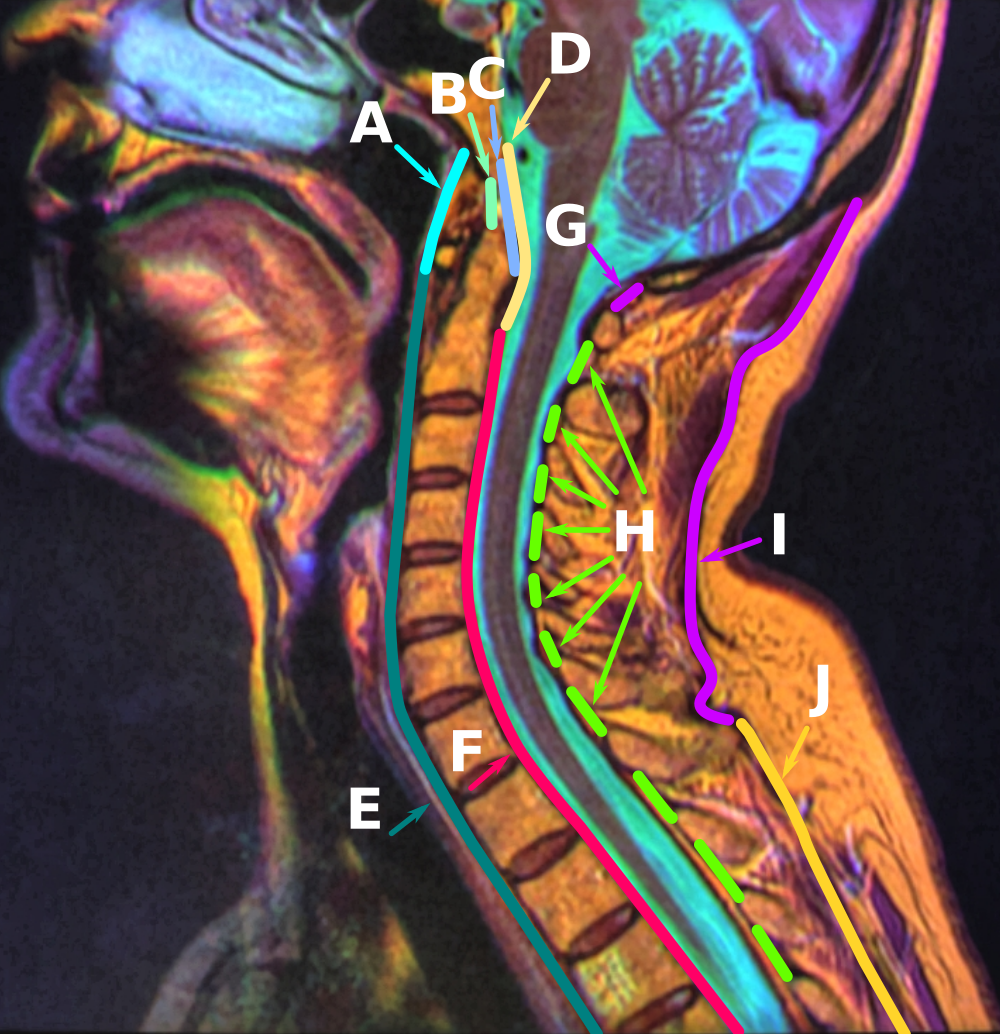
D: Tectorial membrane of atlanto-axial joint

=== Relations ===
The membrane situated is posterior/deep to the transverse ligament of the atlas; the two are separated by a thin intervening layer of loose areolar connective tissue, and sometimes by a bursa.

The membrane is situated anterior/superficially to the spinal dura mater (which is firmly attached to the tectorial membrane).
