= Epiotic =

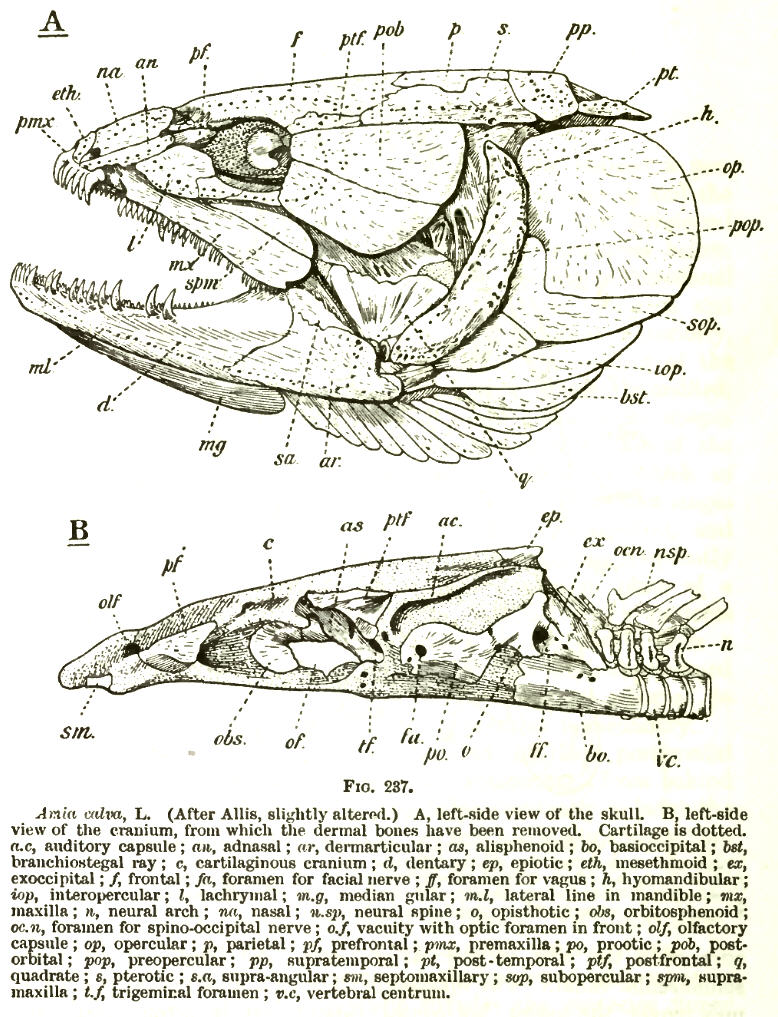
Skull of the bowfin. The epiotic is visible in the lower image, labeled ep.

In vertebrates, the epiotic is a skull bone that participates in the otic capsule and sometimes the external skull wall; along with the prootic and the opisthotic, it encloses the inner ear. Because it frequently fuses to other elements early in ontogeny, it is poorly understood. It has been proposed that the element may represent a recurring neomorph, rather than a bone that is ancestrally present among vertebrates, or even that the element does not exist.

== Evolution ==
The epiotic is present as a distinct element in many actinopterygian fishes, though its homology is debated (see below).

It is absent in most turtles. In at least snakes and other squamates and pseudosuchians, it is present and fused to the supraoccipital, as in the turtle Phrynops and some dinosaurs; in juveniles of some ornithischians, the element is distinct. In birds the element commonly forms a part of the external cranial surface. In mammals and other synapsids, it is believed to be fused to the prootic and the opisthotic to form the petrosal; as the petrosal in humans is fused with the squamosal and tympanic to form the temporal bone, the epiotic may form part of the petrous part of the temporal bone.

== History of study ==
In 1670, Dutch anatomist Theodor Kerckring noted the presence of three distinct ossification centers in the human otic capsule. The significance of this, however, was not recognised at the time.

In his 1858 Croonian Lecture, Thomas Henry Huxley proposed that the otic region of the ostrich consisted of three bones - an anterior, which he called the petrosal, a posterior, which he called the mastoid, and a third. This third bone he termed the epiotic. He further argued that in birds and snakes the element fuses to the supraoccipital, but remained distinct in fishes. By 1864, however, he had changed his opinion, now believing that the so-called "mastoid" developed from portions of all three bones, and identified the remaining two as the prootic and opisthotic.

Huxley's proposal sparked a decades-long debate over the existence of the epiotic, and of the homology of the petrosal in general, with authors such as Georg Baur arguing that the epiotic was entirely absent in reptiles. 1917 opinions by Robert Broom, D. M. S. Watson, and Samuel Wendell Williston expressed doubts over the existence of the element, with Watson stating that he had never met a person who had actually seen the epiotic. Lyell Thomas in 1926 found evidence of three ossification centres in embryonic mice, which he took to support Huxley's interpretation.

Due to the extreme degree of fusion in the periotic region of many vertebrates, it is poorly studied. Additionally, its homology is debated. For example, in actinopterygiian fishes, where an element that is commonly referred to as the "epiotic" exists as a distinct bone, there has been a long history of confusion with the pterotic and the epioccipital, with authors such as Colin Patterson expressing doubt over whether the element is a true epiotic.

In the 21st century, a number of sources describe the existence of the epiotic, while others exclude it without comment.
