= Foramen magnum =

Opening in the occipital bone of the skull

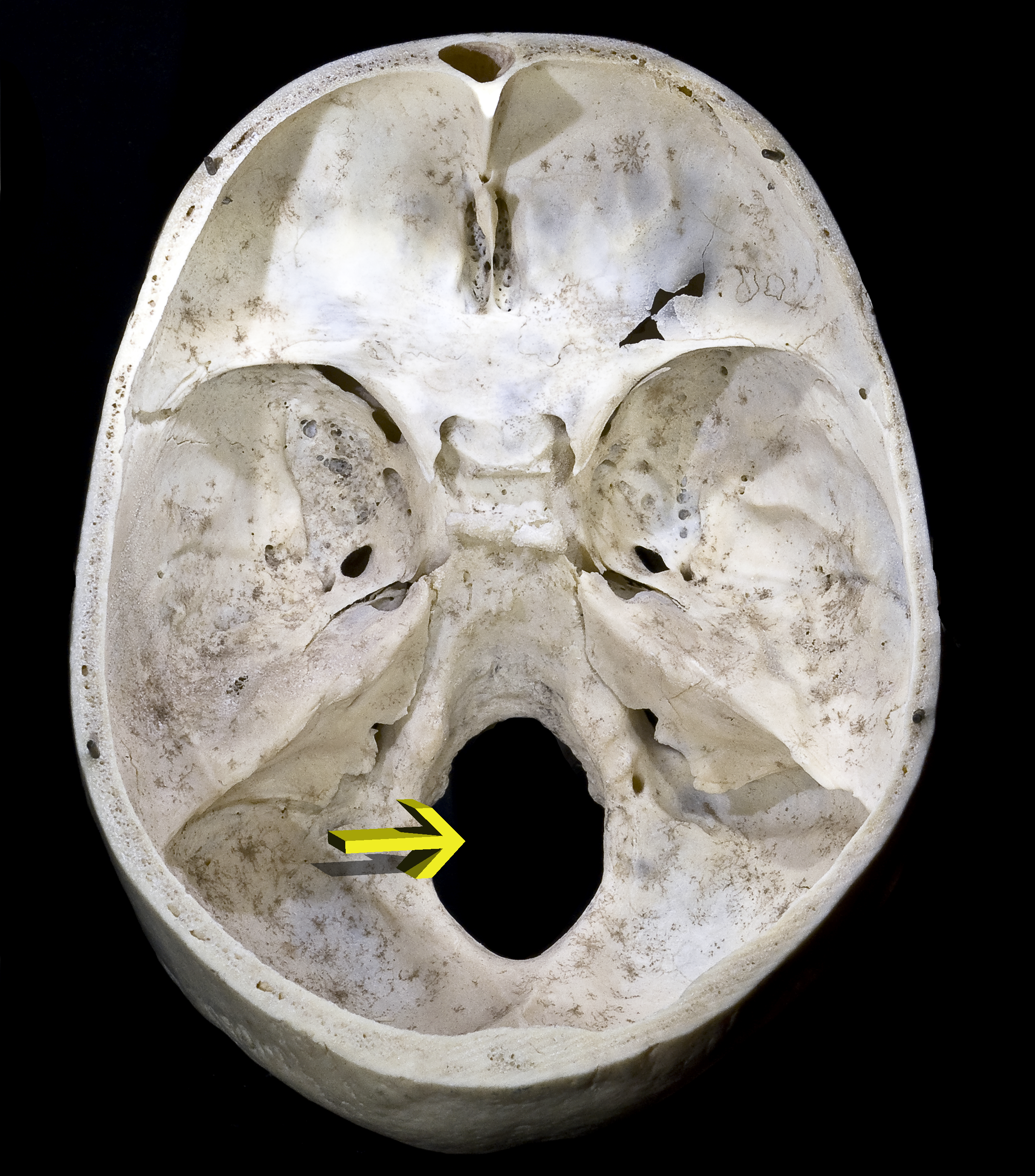
- Upper surface of the human cranial base; the hole indicated by an arrow is the foramen magnum.

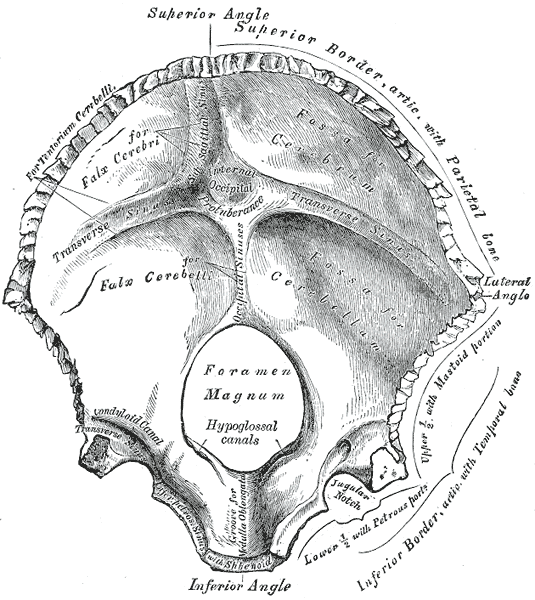
- Occipital bone. Inner surface.

Details
- Part of: Occipital bone
- System: Skeletal

Identifiers
- Latin: foramen magnum
- MeSH: D005539
- TA98: A02.1.04.002
- TA2: 553
- FMA: 75306

The foramen magnum (Note: UK: /fəˌreɪ.mɛn ˈmæɡ.nəm/, US: /fəˌreɪ.mən ˈmæɡ.nəm/ fə-RAY-mən MAG-nəm; lit. 'large opening' in Neo-Latin; Foramen refers to a hole, an orifice, a short passage, or an opening.) is a large, oval-shaped opening in the occipital bone of the skull. It is one of the several oval or circular openings (foramina) in the base of the skull. The spinal cord, an extension of the medulla oblongata, passes through the foramen magnum as it exits the cranial cavity. Apart from the transmission of the medulla oblongata and its membranes, the foramen magnum transmits the vertebral arteries, the anterior and posterior spinal arteries, the tectorial membranes and alar ligaments. It also transmits the accessory nerve into the skull.

Bipedal species typically display an anteriorly placed foramen magnum to balance the head atop the vertebral column. In hominins, this anterior shift is uniquely coupled with increased cranial base flexion. Studies of foramen magnum position have shown its relationship to posture and locomotion. This forward placement is apparent in bipedal hominins such as modern humans, Australopithecus africanus, and Paranthropus boisei. This common feature of bipedal hominins is the driving argument used by the paleontologist Michel Brunet to support that Sahelanthropus tchadensis was bipedal and may be the earliest known bipedal hominin. The recognition of this feature has given scientists another tool for identifying bipedal mammals.

== Structure ==
The foramen magnum is a large, oval-shaped opening (foramen) in the occipital bone of the skull. It is present in humans, and in many other animals. Anteriorly, it is bounded by the basiocciput. Posteriorly, it is bounded by the supraocciput. Laterally, it is bounded by the occipital condyles.

On the occipital bone, the foramen magnum presents two midline cephalometric landmarks. The opisthion is the midpoint on the posterior margin of the foramen magnum. The basion is located at the midpoint on the anterior margin of the foramen magnum.

The alar ligament, which is attached on each side to the tubercle of occipital condyle, divides the foramen magnum into an anterior smaller compartment and a posterior larger compartment.

== Variation ==
From the size, position and where it is located the foramen magnum can help determine many factors. In humans, the foramen magnum is found to be located and positioned anteriorly. In some rodents and mammals, the foramen magnum can be found anteriorly in the cranium.

The foramen magnum varies in size between individuals. Earlier ossification of the occipital bone leads to a smaller foramen.

The foramen magnum varies in size and shape when comparing different populations to each other. In humans, men tend to have a larger sized foramen magnum than women, but the overall shape is consistent.

In humans, the foramen magnum is farther underneath the head than in the other great apes. Thus, in humans, the neck muscles (including the occipitofrontalis muscle) do not need to be as robust in order to hold the head upright. Comparisons of the position of the foramen magnum in early hominid species are useful to determine how comfortable a particular species was when walking on two limbs (bipedalism) rather than four (quadrupedalism).

=== Heart-shaped foramen magnum ===
In an early hominin, Paranthropus boisei, also known as Australopithecus boisei, has a foramen magnum that is similar to a shape of a heart or a cardioid. When KNM-ER 406 was examined among other species, the foramen magnum was different. Compared to the usual oval-shaped foramen magnum, the shape of the Australopithecus boisei foramen magnum appears to be shortened. In the foramen magnum of Australopithecus boisei, both the anterior and posterior are different in size and diameter. The anterior of the foramen magnum had a greater lateral diameter and was more broad compared to other early hominins. While the lateral diameter of the posterior foramen magnum was shortened to create more of a cardioid shape. The anterior edges of the foramen magnum in Australopithecus boisei lacks the oval curve that would normally appear in other species that have an oval to circular-shaped foramen magnum. The unique shape of the foramen magnum was also seen in some casts of Hadar species. The Hadar shows traits and characteristics of having a similar cardioid shape. The change in the shape of the foramen magnum has been studied to identify the possibility of different functions. There is a potential correlation between the change of shape of the foramen magnum to how it functions in the body. Although not proven, compared to other hominins, the route that blood travels through the foramen magnum in Australopithecus boisei are more straight and direct. With the enlargement and broadening of the anterior foramen magnum, allow for more venous drainage from the occipital and marginal sinuses.

== Function ==
The foramen magnum transmits a number of important structures between the neck and the neurocranium.

Structures passing through anterior compartment (osseoligamentous compartment) include:

- The apical ligament and tip of the dens.
- The upper band of cruciate ligament of the atlas (C1 vertebra).
- The membrana tectoria.

Structures passing through posterior compartment (neurovascular compartment) include:

- The lower end of medulla oblongata, surrounded by meninges.
- The fourth part of the vertebral artery, surrounded by sympathetic plexus of nerves.
- accessory nerves.
- anterior and posterior spinal arteries.
- The tonsil of the cerebellum (occasionally) as in a tonsillar herniation known as a Chiari malformation.

== Clinical significance ==
The foramen magnum may be too large, too small, or the wrong shape. A small foramen magnum can cause neurological problems, and the reduced circulation of cerebrospinal fluid can cause hydrocephalus. This may be treated with suboccipital craniectomy.

== Other animals ==
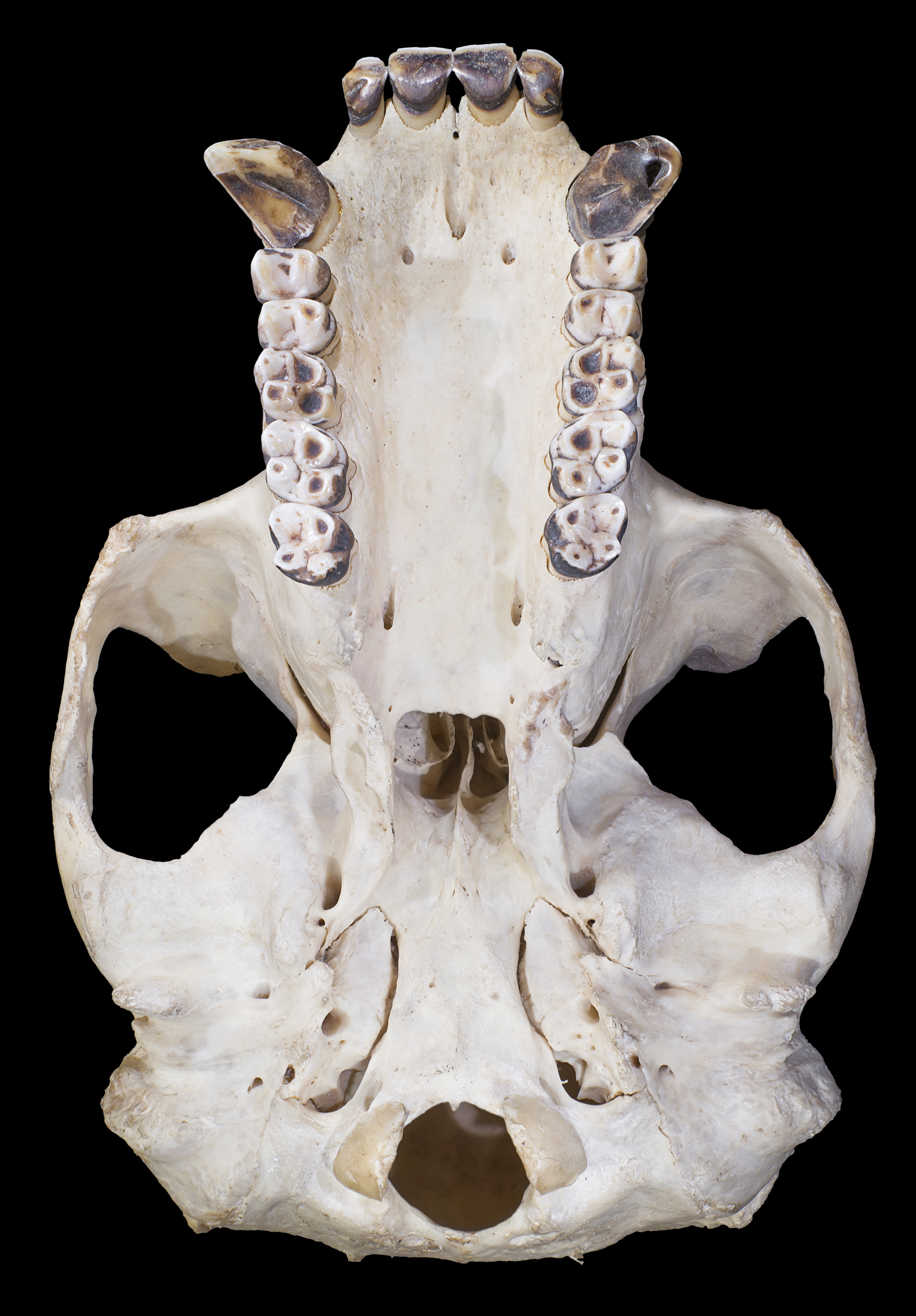
Cranial base of a western gorilla. The foramen magnum is positioned quite far to the rear.

In basal chondrichthyans, the foramen magnum was one of several openings to the rear of the neurocranium.

In non-human osteichthyans, the foramen magnum is rimmed ventrally by the basioccipital, laterally by the exoccipitals, and dorsally by the supraoccipital.

An anterior foramen magnum can be found in other bipedal mammals besides humans.

== Evolution in fossils ==
Although not fully proven, there are many studies that show the possibility that where the foramen magnum is positioned in the cranium is significant in fossils. By being able to locate where the foramen magnum is positioned, anthropologists and other researchers are able to determine whether or not the species were bipedal (among other factors). The positioning of the foramen magnum changing over time can be seen in different fossils. Analyzing the foramen magnum in fossils like Ardipithecus ramidus, links the fossil to other earlier and later hominid who share similar anterior foramen magnum and other bipedalism features. Although not proven, there are correlations with the foramen magnum being more anterior positioned to the ability of mammals to walk on two limbs. Comparing this to other animals, such as some primates, the foramen magnum are located more of a posterior position in the cranium. With the foramen magnum being position anterior in the cranium, the body of bipedal mammals is given a different center of gravity compared to quadrupedal mammals. The anterior foramen magnum shifts the weight of the body more to the mammals' pelvis and femur, present in some primates, like great apes. With a posterior foramen magnum, the alignment and weight of the body falls more lateral under the head This allows for humans and other bipedal mammals to be able to walk on two limbs. Even with a posterior foramen magnum, some primates are still able to use their lower two limbs to walk.

With a common anterior foramen magnum in fossils, the fossils can be studied and researched to link mammals to others who are potentially bipedal. With more correlations and similarities of fossils who have an anterior foramen magnum; it links to the idea that these species might be bipedal. The shift in the foramen magnum moving towards a more anterior position in the cranium, gives rise to the idea of possible bipedalism.

== Additional images ==
Skull seen from below. The hole through which the medulla (shown in red) is passing is foramen magnum.

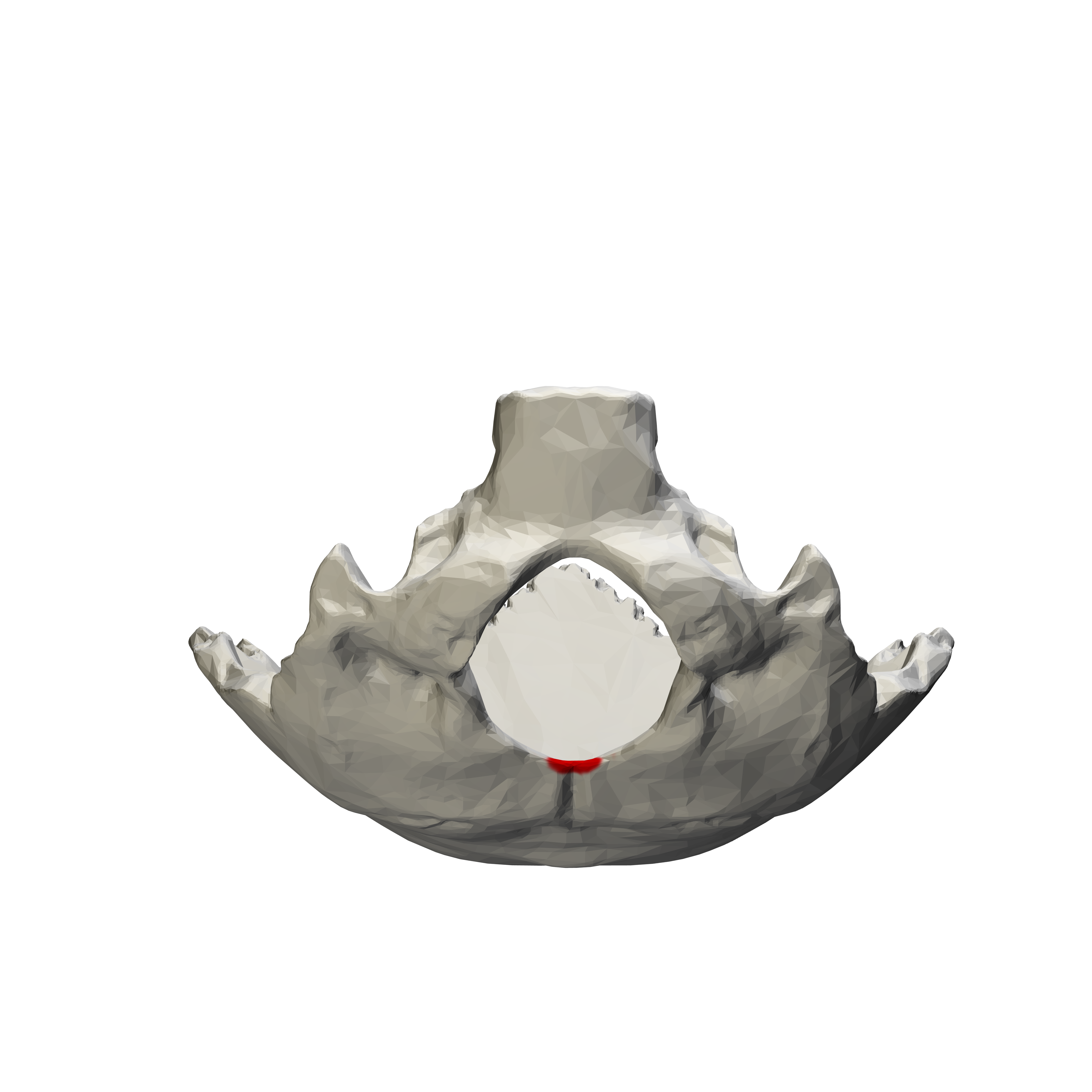
Opisthion shown in red

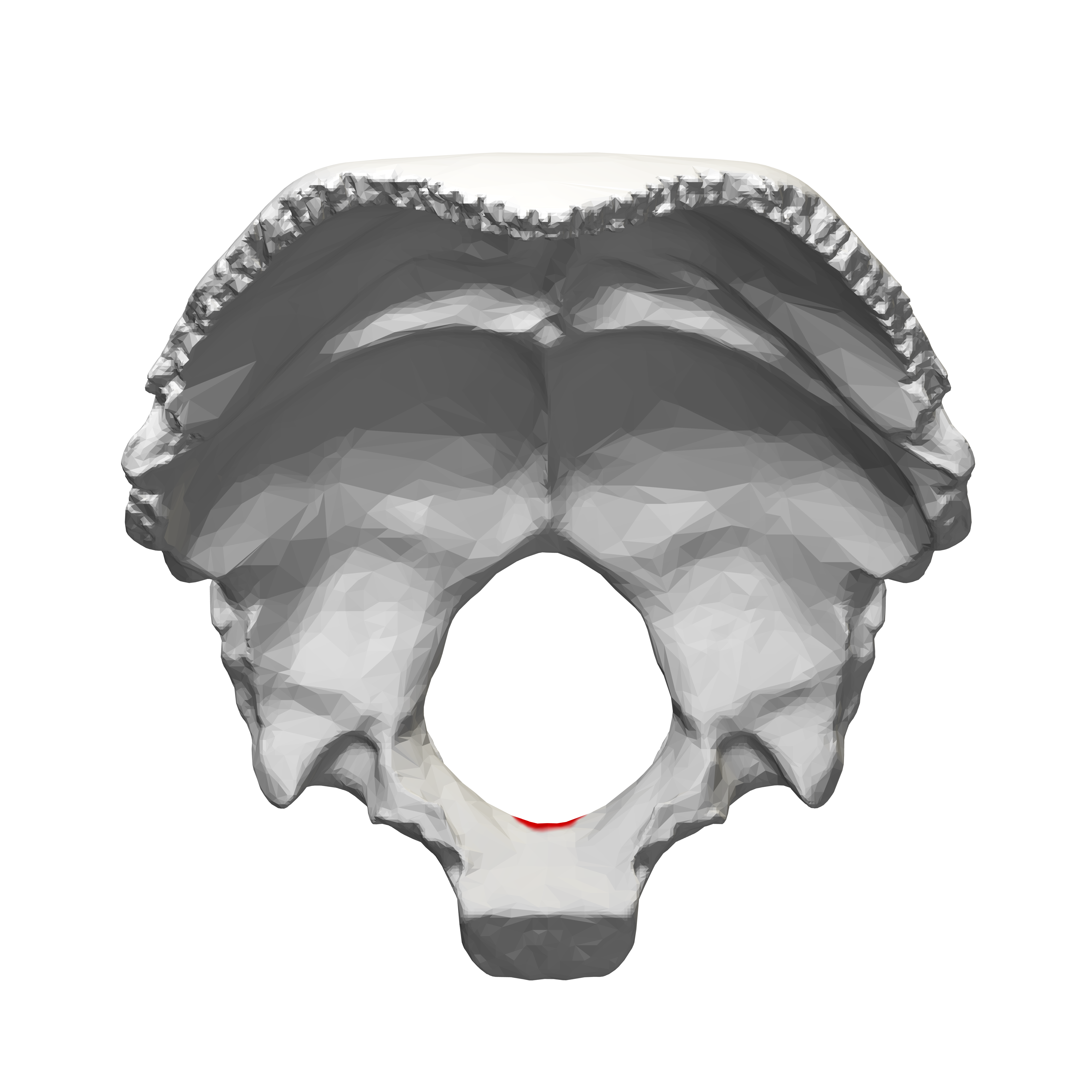
Occipital bone inner surface (basion shown in red)

== See also ==
- Posterior cranial fossa – the part of the cranial cavity between the foramen magnum and the cerebellar tentorium
