= Basioccipital =

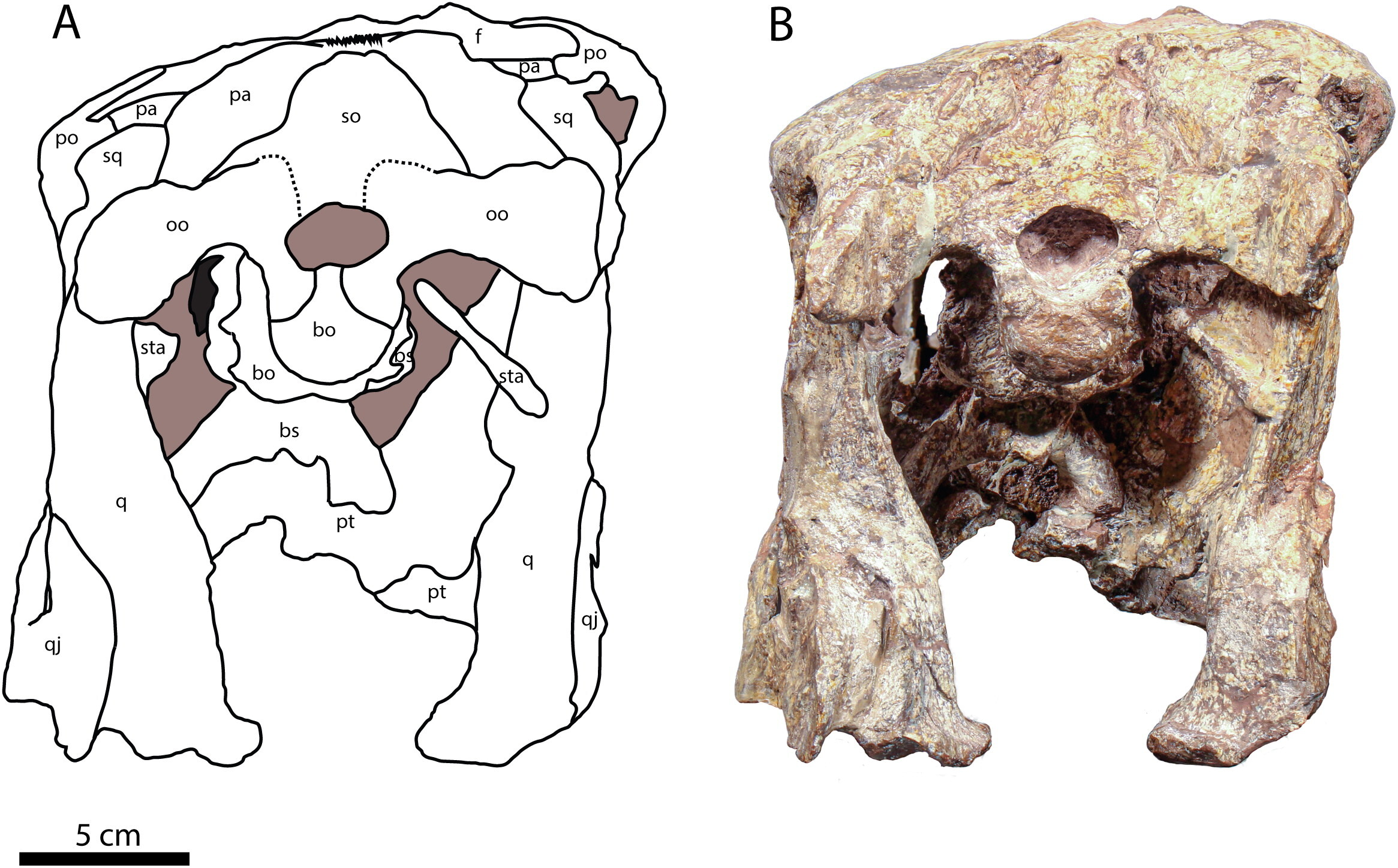
Skull of Plateosaurus in posterior view. Basioccipital is labeled as bo.

The basioccipital is a bone present in the posterior region of the skull in vertebrates. It encloses the ventral margin of the foramen magnum. It is a part of the chondrocranium.

== Evolution ==
Unlike most of the skull, the basioccipital develops from somites, which otherwise develop into the vertebrae. This has led to the hypothesis that the basioccipital has its evolutionary origin as a modified vertebra. However, this hypothesis has been contested on the basis of embryonic evidence in actinopterygian fishes.

The basioccipital is present in basal amniotes, where it forms the majority of the occipital condyle. This is the role it takes in most modern and fossil sauropsids.

In humans, the basioccipital fuses with the supraocipitals and the exoccipitals to form the basilar part of the occipital bone.
