= Prootic =

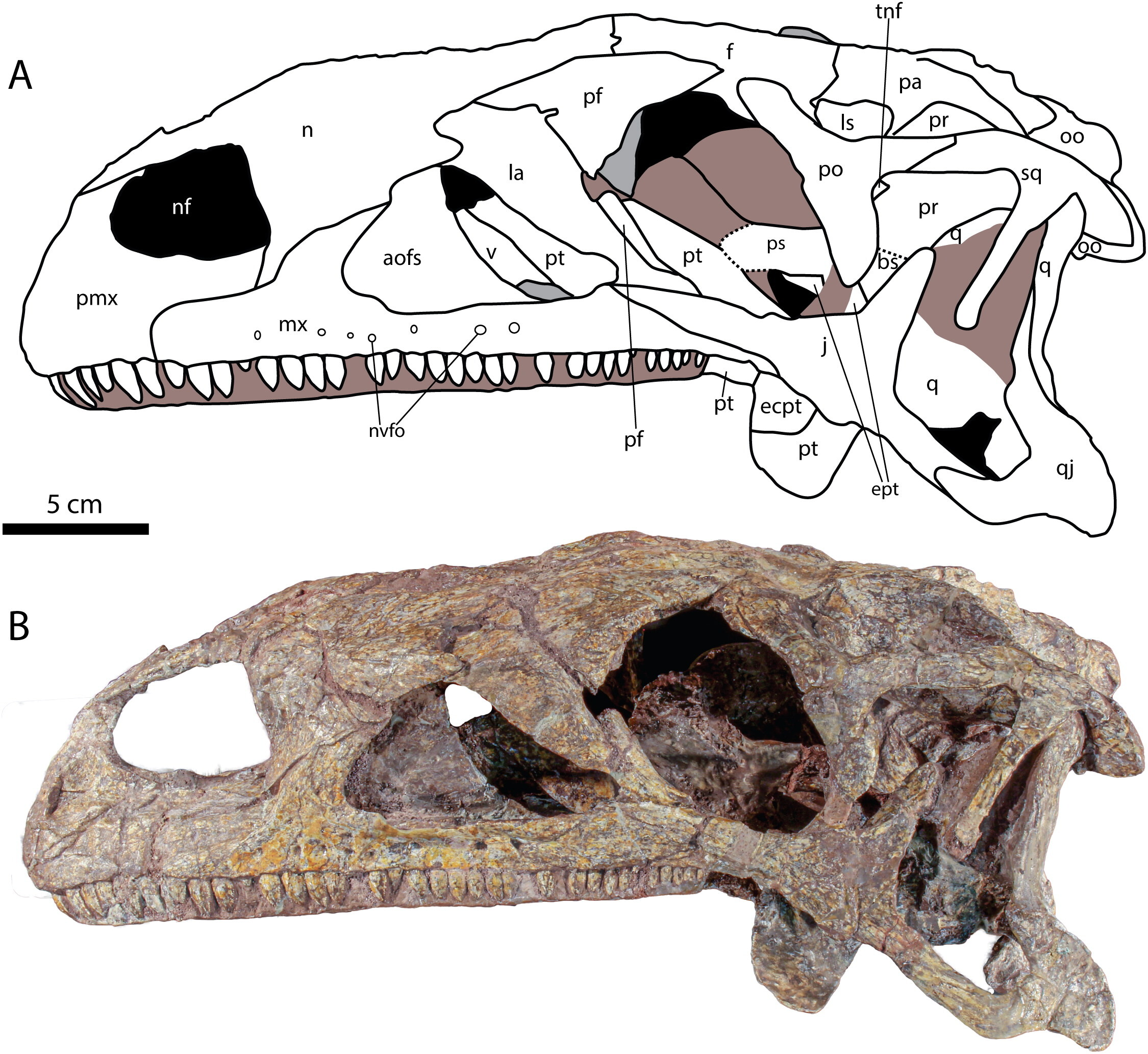
Skull of Plateosaurus trossingensis; the prootic is labeled pr.

The prootic (spelled proötic in some older works) is a bone of the skull that participates in the otic capsule; along with the opisthotic and possibly epiotic, it encloses the inner ear. In many animals, it also forms much of the front lateral portion of the braincase.

== Function ==
The prootic forms the anterior part of the otic capsule; together with the other periotic bones it encloses the bony labyrinth, which allows for hearing and balance. The trigeminal nerve (cranial nerve V), which controls jaw movement and facial sensation, exits the braincase through a notch at the front edge of the prootic.

== Evolution ==
The prootic, as with other bones of the otic capsule, develops from the vertebrate chondrocranium (the internal cartilaginous braincase). The otic capsule is believed to have been present in the ancestor of modern vertebrates; however, as early vertebrates lacked endochondral bone, the prootic was not present. Ossification of the otic capsule, and therefore the first appearance of the prootic, occurred in early members of the clade Osteicthyes (bony fish and their descendants).

In teleost fishes, the prootic articulates with the epiotic and the sphenotic to form the otic capsule.

In amphibians and sauropsids, the prootic articulates with the opisthotic to form the otic capsule. In mammals, it fuses with the opisthotic and the epiotic to form the petrosal. In humans, the petrosal is fused with the squamosal and tympanic to form the temporal bone, and therefore the prootic is equivalent to part of the petrous part of the temporal bone.
