= Petrosal bone =

Bone of the skull

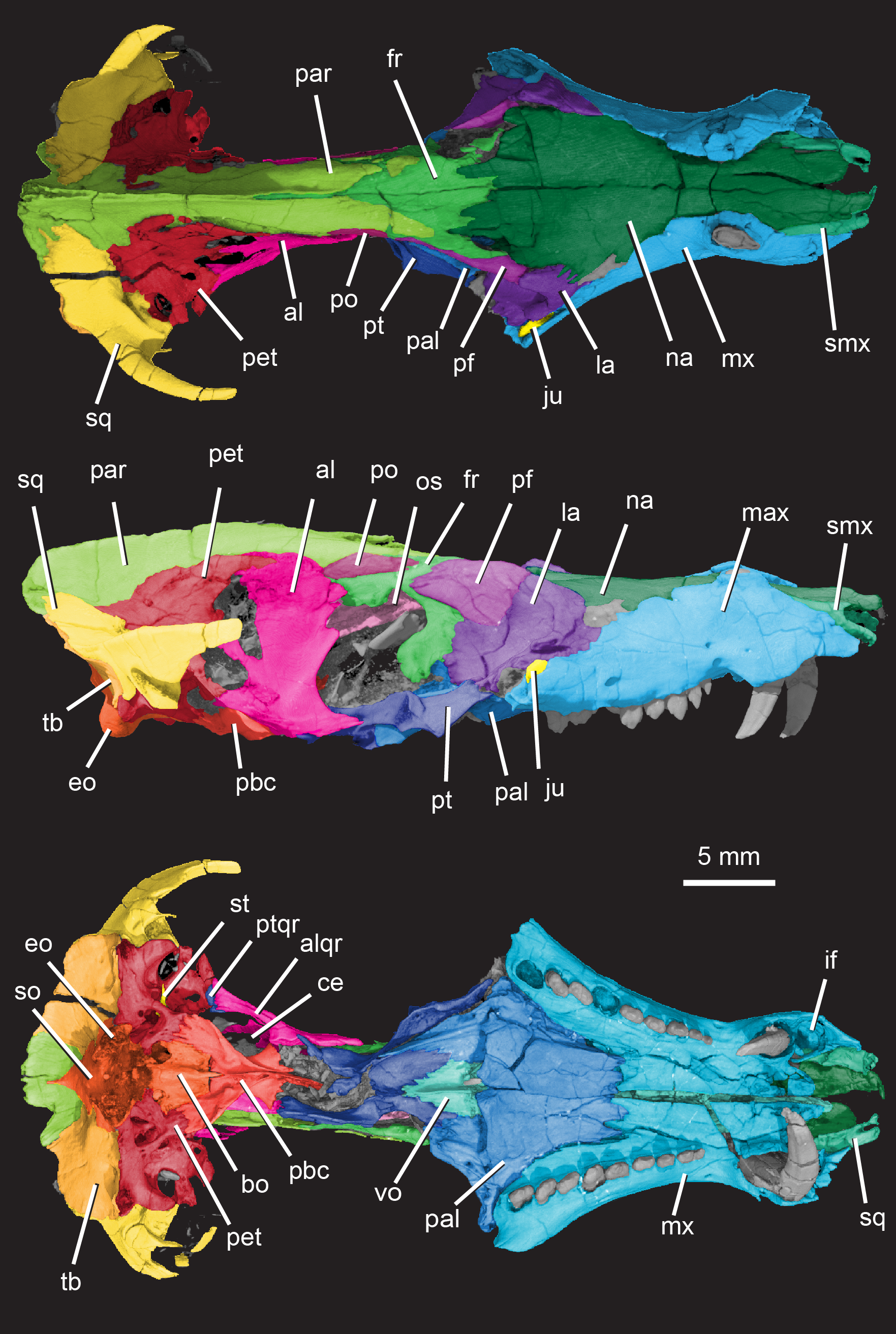
Skull of Pseudotherium, a non-mammalian cynodont. The petrosal is shown in red and indicated as pet.

The petrosal or petrosal bone, also known as the periotic bone or mastoid bone, is a bone of the skull that encloses the inner ear in mammals and their closest relatives. It is formed from a fusion of the prootic, the opisthotic, and possibly the epiotic; in humans, it is fused to the squamosal and the tympanic to form the temporal bone, of which it forms the petrous and mastoid portions.

The petrosal includes the bony labyrinth, which houses the cochlea. The cochlea is connected to the stapes via the oval window. The petrosal articulates with the ectotympanic, which typically forms part of the auditory bulla; in primates, the petrosal itself forms a major part of the bulla.

In most non-mammalian synapsids, the prootic and opisthotic are separate elements. They are fused together to form the petrosal in mammaliaforms and the closely related tritylodontids, Brasilitherium, and Diarthrognathus, while in Brasilodon and Riograndia they remain separate.

In cetaceans, the petrosal fuses to the tympanic bone. Research on the petrosal in cetaceans has long been conducted separately from that on other mammals; because of this, a large number of anatomical terms to refer to parts of the petrosal have been developed in parallel, leading to confusion and difficulty of comparison between the two sets of literature.

The petrosal is an especially dense bone (indeed, its name literally translates to "stony"); because of this, it readily fossilises. Fossil petrosals have been intensively studied, as they often survive processes that destroy more delicate bones.
