= Exoccipital =

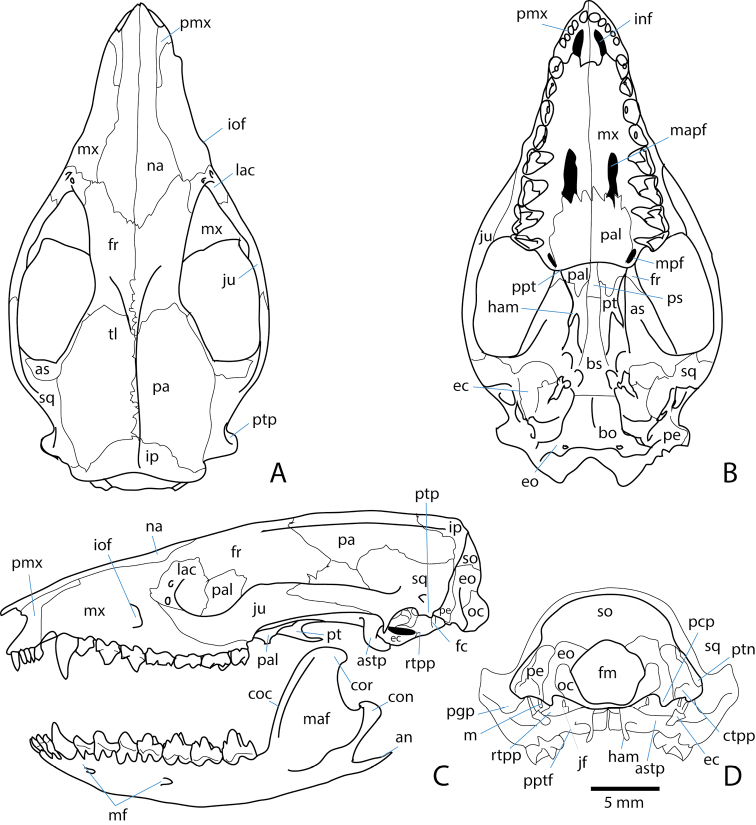
Skull of Monodelphis. Exoccipital is labeled eo.

The exoccipital is a paired bone of the skull located on either side of the foramen magnum in vertebrates. They form part of the posterior wall of the braincase.

== Development ==
The exoccipitals are a part of the chondrocranium, and develop from the occipital arch in the embryo; as such, they develop from somites and may share serial homology with the vertebrae. They are among the first bones of the skull to undergo ossification.

== Evolution ==
As the exoccipitals develop from somites, they may have evolved from vertebrae, though it is more likely that this represents a homeotic transformation. The exoccipitals are not present among the earliest vertebrates or in modern cyclostomes or chondrichthyans, as those groups lack endochondral bone.

Among osteichthyans, the exoccipitals are present in actinopterygians and in all tetrapods. In amniotes, the exoccipitals are pierced by the hypoglossal canal, through which the hypoglossal nerve exits the brain.

In most stem-reptiles, the exoccipital is fused to the basioccipital, while in most squamates and all archosaurs the exoccpital fuses to the opisthotic to form the otoccipital.

In mammals, including humans, the exoccipitals are fused to the basioccipital and supraoccipital to form the occipital bone, specifically the lateral parts. The paired occipital condyles are each located on one of the exoccipitals.
