= Spinal arteries =

The spinal arteries are the:

- Anterior spinal artery
- Posterior spinal artery
