= Skull roof =

Roofing bones of the skull

The full complement of bones of the tetrapod skull roof, as seen in the temnospondyl Xenotosuchus

The skull roof or the roofing bones of the skull are a set of bones covering the brain, eyes and nostrils in bony fishes, including land-living vertebrates. The bones are derived from dermal bone and are part of the dermatocranium.

In comparative anatomy, the term is applied to the whole dermatocranium. In general anatomy, the roofing bones may refer specifically to the bones that form above and alongside the brain and neurocranium (i.e., excluding the marginal upper jaw bones such as the maxilla and premaxilla). In human anatomy, the skull roof often refers specifically to the skullcap.

== Origin ==
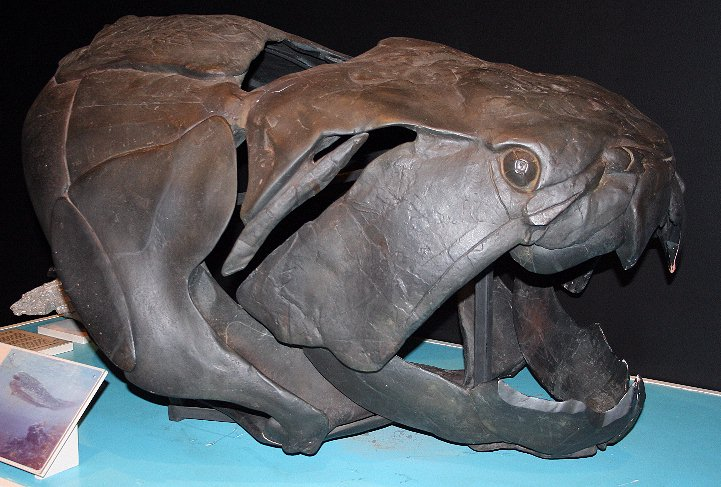
Dermal armour in Dunkleosteus, a placoderm.

Early armoured fish (such as jawless ostracoderms and jawed placoderms) did not have a skull in the common understanding of the word, but instead had a cartilaginous endocranium that was partially open from above. The loose cartilage was topped by dermal bones forming armour. The dermal bones gradually evolved into a fixed unit overlaying the endocranium like a heavy "lid", protecting the animal's head and brain from above. A more or less full shield of fused dermal bones was common in early bony fishes of the Devonian, and particularly well developed in shallow water species.

Cartilaginous fish, such as sharks, have a skeleton which is entirely formed from cartilage. They lack a continuous dermal armour and thus have no proper skull roof.

== Bony fishes ==
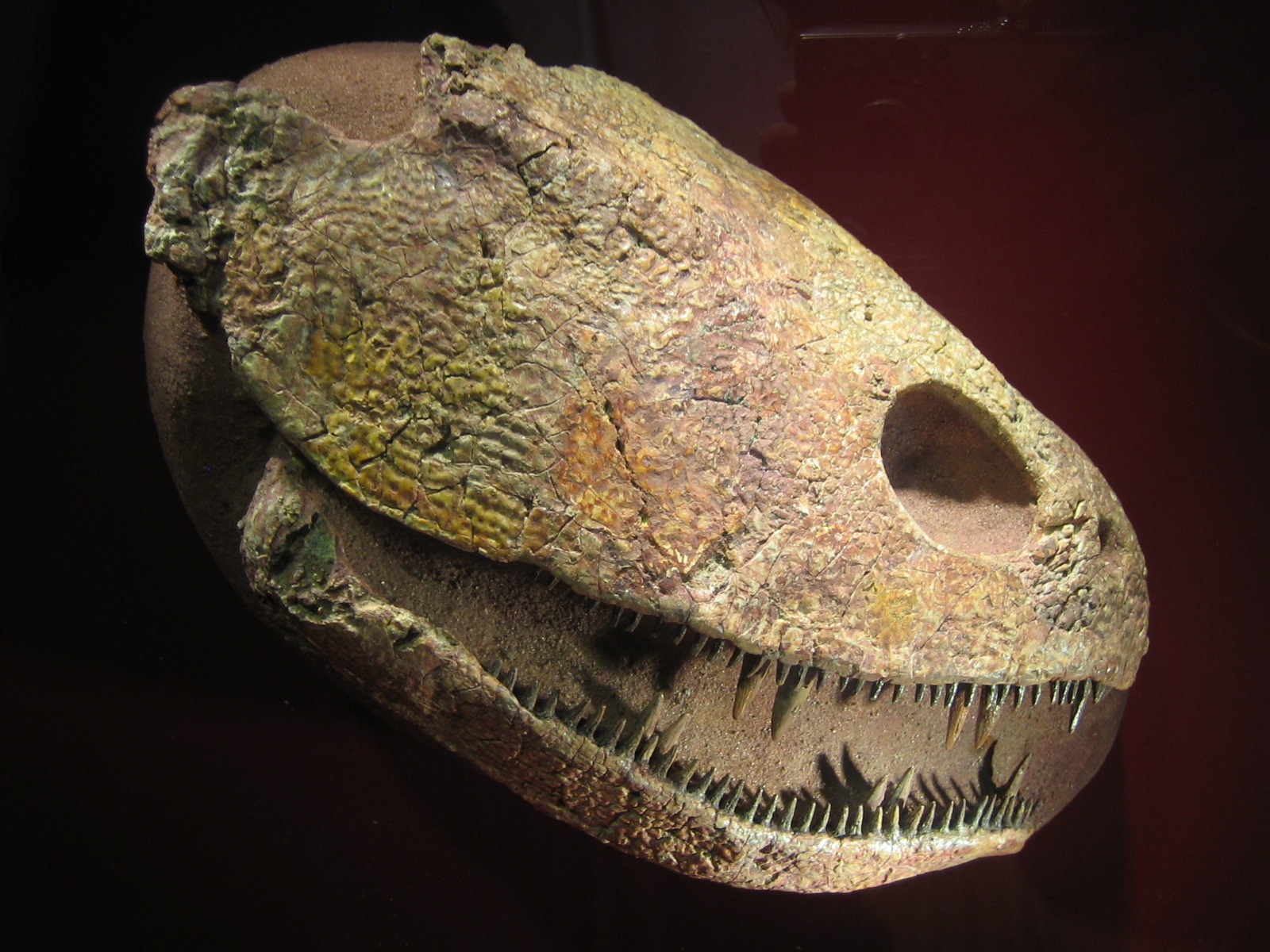
Skull of Platycephalichthys, a sarcopterygian. Most of the roofing over the cheek region is formed by the operculum.

In early sarcopterygians ("lobe-finned fish"), the skull roof was composed of numerous bony plates, particularly around the nostrils and behind each eye. The skull proper was joined by the bones of the operculum. The skull itself was composed rather loosely, with a joint between the bones covering the brain and the snout.

The skull roof in lungfish is composed of a number of bony plates that are not readily compared to those found in early amphibians. In most ray-finned fishes, the skull is often reduced to a series of loose elements, and a skull roof as such is not found.

== Early tetrapods ==
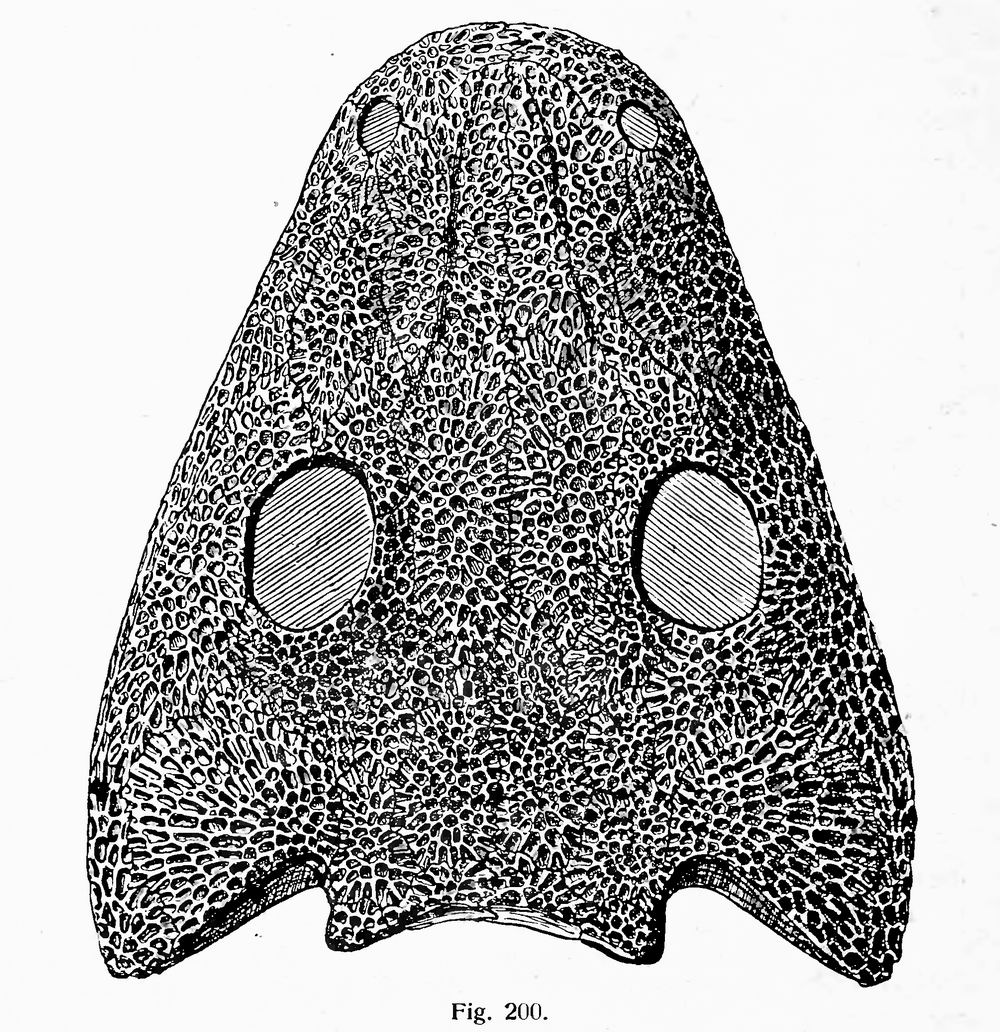
The skull roof in Cheliderpeton, a temnospondyl amphibian

As tetrapodomorph fish trended towards greater adaptations for life on land, the skull became more tightly integrated. At the same time, the number of bones were reduced, the skull bones separated from the shoulder girdle, and the operculum disappeared. The earliest limbed tetrapods ("amphibians" in the broad sense) solidified a pattern of plates which formed the basis for that seen in all land-living vertebrates. These early tetrapods (including temnospondyls, embolomeres, and various minor groups) have historically been termed "labyrinthodonts" ("maze teeth") or "stegocephalians" ("roof heads"). Not including marginal or cheek bones (such as the premaxillae, maxillae, jugals, quadratojugals, and squamosals), the skull roof bones established by these early tetrapods include the following:

- Nasals (midline)
- Lacrimals
- Prefrontals
- Frontals (midline)
- Postfrontals
- Postorbitals
- Parietals (midline)
- Intertemporals
- Supratemporals
- Postparietals (midline)
- Tabulars

The skull roof itself formed a continuous cover over the whole of the head, leaving only openings for nostrils (nares), eyes (orbits), and a small parietal eye (also known as a pineal foramen) between the parietal bones. This type of skull was inherited by the first amniotes (fully terrestrial tetrapods), which evolved in the Carboniferous. This type of skull roof without any above openings behind the eyes is called anapsid. Today, the only reptiles with anapsid skulls are turtles, though this is likely a case of secondary loss of the temporal fenestrae.

In modern amphibians such as frogs and salamanders, the skull roof is further reduced and has large openings. Only in caecilians can a full covering skull roof be found, an adaption for burrowing.

=== The debate over skull roof homology ===
One of the most persistent debates in 20th-century paleontology was how to homologize the skull roof of fish with that of tetrapods. In practically all tetrapods, the midline of the skull roof comprises at least three pairs of plate-like bones. From front-to-back, these bones are the nasals (top of the snout), frontals (between the eyes), and parietals (behind the frontals). Early tetrapods also possessed postparietals, additional paired or singular bones at the rim of the skull, behind the parietals. Lobe-finned fish and early ray-finned fish usually lack paired bones at the top of the snout, instead presenting a mosaic of smaller plates. Nevertheless, two pairs of bones do consistently occur further back. The front pair are positioned between the eyes and surround a pineal foramen, when it is present. The latter pair are elongated and abut the extrascapular bones, which lie behind the skull. The "traditional" or "orthodox" hypothesis considers these two pairs to be equivalent to the frontal and parietal bones, respectively. This was mainly justified by their position in regards to the eyes and brain, in accordance with mammal anatomy.

An alternative interpretation was proposed by T.S. Westoll (1938, 1943) and A.S. Romer (1941). Their interpretation noted that the tetrapods with a pineal foramen almost always have the hole surrounded by the parietal bones. This would indicate that the "frontal" bones of fish are actually parietal bones. By extension, the "parietals" of fish are actually postparietals, while the tetrapod nasal and frontal bones develop from fused snout ossicles. According to this hypothesis, the eyes shift forwards, the snout expands, and the postorbital region (behind the eyes) contracts at the origin of tetrapods. Newly discovered "transitional" fossils such as Ichthyostega, Elpistostege, and Panderichthys were used as further evidence in support of their interpretation.

The Westoll/Romer hypothesis was initially controversial, with the strongest critiques coming from Scandinavian paleoichthyologists. Proponents of the orthodox hypothesis argued that the "parietals" of fish are too strongly connected to the underlying brain anatomy to justify the W/R scenario, which posits that the "parietals" (= postparietals) diminish into oblivion over the course of evolution. Another concern was that the W/R hypothesis necessitates the complete loss of the extrascapulars in tetrapods. According to the orthodox hypothesis, the tetrapod postparietals develop from extrascapulars which have acquired a stronger connection to the skull. Despite the criticism, the W/R scenario is now accepted by most paleontologists studying the fish-tetrapod transition. Developmental studies show support for the novel evolution of the frontal bones in tetrapods and their lack of homology with the "frontals" of fish. Further tetrapodomorph discoveries, such as Acanthostega and Tiktaalik, provide more concrete evidence for the anatomical shifts hypothesized by Westoll and Romer.

== Diapsids and synapsids ==
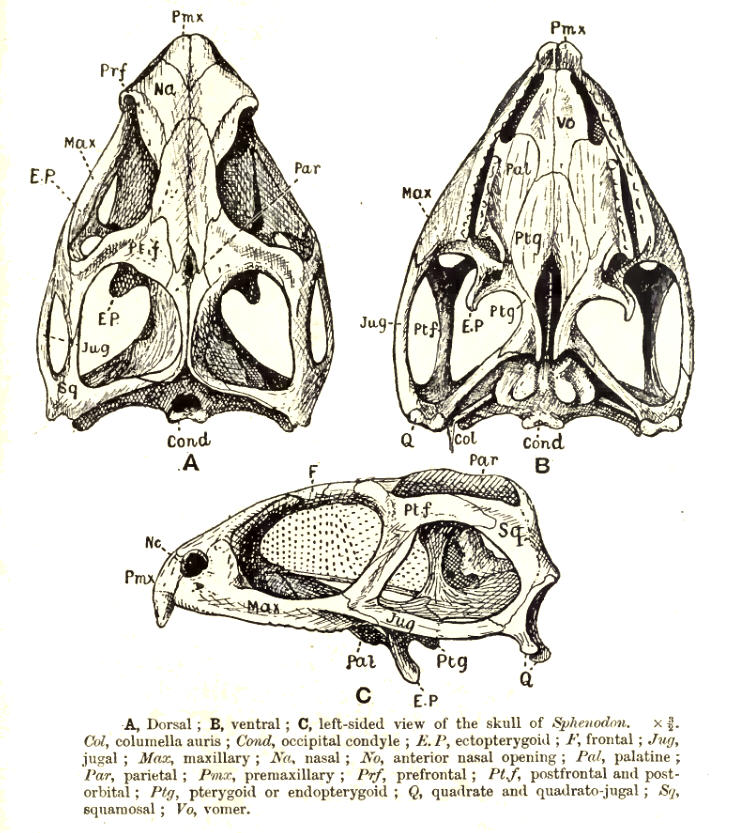
Tuatara skull, showing the double openings behind the eye.

In two groups of early amniotes, the skull roof evolved temporal fenestrae to allow for greater movement of the jaw muscles. The two groups evolved the openings independently:

- The synapsids have one opening on each side, fairly low on the side of the skull, between the jugal or zygomatic bone and the elements above. Synapsids include mammals and their reptile-like ancestors (historically described under the misnomer "mammal-like reptiles"). In mammals, the side opening is closed by the sphenoid bone, so that the skull roof appears whole, despite the temporal opening.
- The diapsids have two openings on each side, the two openings separated by an arch formed from processes of the postorbital and squamosal bones. All modern reptiles (apart from turtles) are diapsids in an anatomical sense, as are the birds and their dinosaur ancestors.
