= Opisthotic =

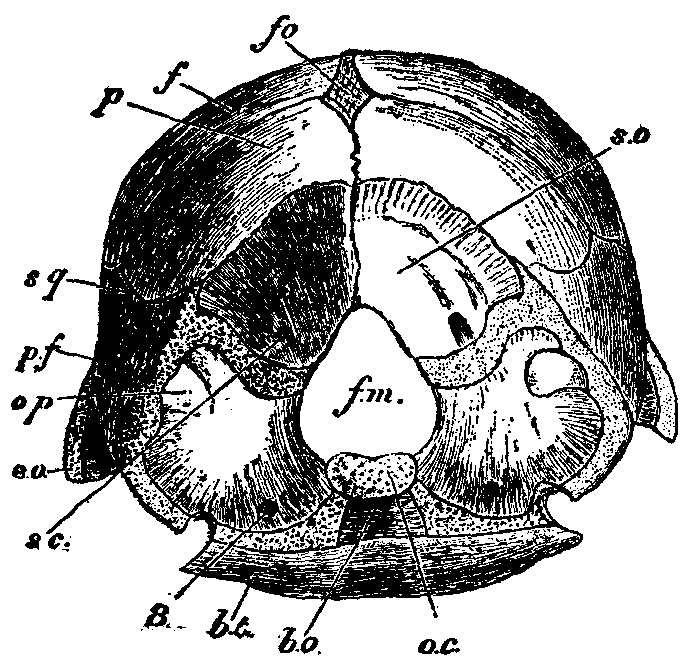
Posterior view of the skull of the chicken. Opisthotic is indicated by op.

The opisthotic, sometimes spelled opisthootic, is a bone of the skull that participates in the otic capsule; along with the prootic and epiotic, it encloses the inner ear.

== Function ==
The opisthotic forms the posterior part of the otic capsule. Together with the other periotic bones, it encloses the bony labyrinth, which allows for the senses of hearing and balance.

== Evolution ==
As with other bones of the otic capsule, the opisthotic forms a part of the chondrocranium. Though the otic capsule is believed to have been present in the ancestor of living vertebrates, the opisthotic only becomes ossified in osteichthyes, with the appearance of endochondral bone.

In teleost fishes, the opisthotic articulates with the epiotic and the sphenotic to form the otic capsule.

In amphibians and sauropsids, the opisthotic and prootic articulate to form the otic capsule; in most diapsids, it is fused to the exoccipital to form the otoccipital. In mammals, it fuses with the prootic and the epiotic to form the petrosal; as the petrosal in humans is fused with the squamosal and tympanic to form the temporal bone, the opisthotic forms part of the petrous part of the temporal bone.
