= Supraoccipital =

Skull bone

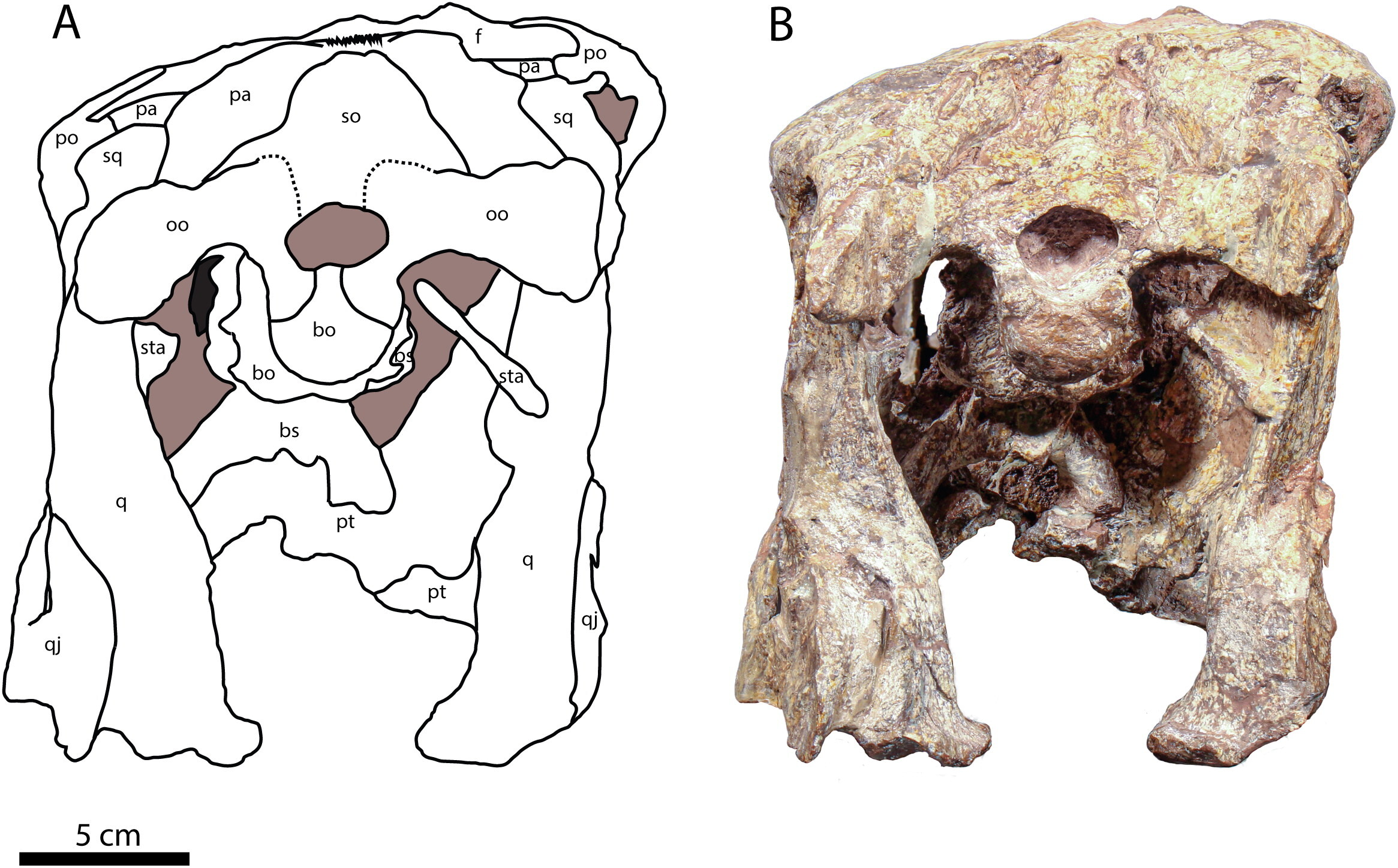
Skull of Plateosaurus in posterior view. Supraoccipital is labeled so.

The supraoccipital is a skull bone present in many vertebrates that forms part of the braincase. It lies above the foramen magnum. It ossifies from a cartilaginous bridge that spans between the otic capsules, and consequently has a different origin from the basioccipital and exoccipitals, which are equivalent to the centrum and neural arch of a vertebra, respectively. The supraoccipital ossifies earlier in the development of mammals than it does in other amniotes. In primates, the interparietal bone fuses with the supraoccipital early in embryonic development. In humans, the supraoccipital fuses with the exoccipitals and basioccipital to form the occipital bone, of which it forms the squamous part.
