= Khoratichthys =

Khoratichthys Temporal range: Late Jurassic-Early Cretaceous ~149.2–137.1 Ma

Scientific classification
- Kingdom: Animalia
- Phylum: Chordata
- Class: Actinopterygii
- Clade: Ginglymodi
- Order: Lepisosteiformes
- Genus: †Khoratichthys; Deesri et al., 2016

Type species
- Khoratichthys gibbus Deesri et al., 2016

Genus of fishes (fossil)

Khoratichthys is an extinct genus of ginglymodian from Thailand. The only specimen known from the genus was found in strata belonging to the latest Jurassic to Early Cretaceous Phu Kradung Formation. Similar to a few other closely related genera, Khoratichthys has a hunched back that rapidly increases in height behind the head. The fish has been found to be a basal member of Lepisosteiformes, the larger clade that contains gars.

== History and naming ==
The holotype and only known specimen of Khoratichthys (NRRU 6011-01) is thought to originate from a reservoir within the Khao Phu Luang national forest of the Nakhon Ratchasima Province, Thailand. The strata within this reservoir belong to the Late Jurassic-Early Cretaceous Phu Kradung Formation. The reason why the exact locality of the holotype is unknown is due to the fact that the specimen was collected from an offering site used by Ban Non Sao-Ae and other nearby villages in 1997. The specimen was later described by Uthumporn Deesri and coauthors in 2016 where they described it as the first ginglymodian material from the formation found that far south of the Phu Phan Mountain Range.

The generic name of Khoratichthys originates from 'Khorat' which is the local name of Nakhon Ratchasima. The species name "gibbus" is the Latin word for hump, named after the hunched back of the fish.

== Description ==
Khoratichthys is a medium-sized fish known by a single, fairly complete specimen with a standard length of about 30 centimetres (12 in). The body of the fish, as seen with a few other ginglymodians, has been described as hunchbacked due to the rapid increase in depth between the pectoral and dorsal fins. The head itself has a depth of 65 millimetres (2.6 in) which sharply increases to 115 millimetres (4.5 in) in the mentioned area. After this point, the body decreased in depth until the caudal peduncle which has a depth of about 40 millimetres (1.6 in).

=== Skull ===
The sloped skull of Khoratichthys is fairly long, being 95 centimetres (37 in), and most likely had a wide gape. The only two bones of the skull roof identified in the known specimen are the frontal and parietal. The former is much longer than the latter and neither of the bones seem to have any sort of ornamentation. One of the extrascapulars might be preserved in the specimen. If accurate, the bone would have had a curved groove towards the front. The jaws of the fish are also similarly incomplete with only the dentary and premaxillary being confidentally identified in the specimen. The preserved anterior portion shows a curved lower jaw with teeth organized into four rows. Each of the teeth have a cylindrical base with a rounded acrodine cap (also referred to as semitritorial teeth). A line of at least three pores are visible on the upper area of the bone, representing the mandibular sensory canal. The premaxilla is small and slightly curved with nasal processes that run under the frontal bone. Teeth on this bone are similar to those seen on the dentary but smaller. There is a third bone that is identified as either the maxilla or a compound structure made up of parts of the pterygoid and palatine. The orbit of the fish is large and surrounded by a number of bones. The ventral and posteroventral edges of the orbit are made up of at least six infraorbitals. The first of these is the largest though doesn't make up any part of the orbit, a trait seen in other ginglymodians. The second and third infraorbital are trapezoidal and rectangular respectively with the latter being the smallest in the series. The other three bones of the series are square with curved ventral and dorsal edges. Dorsal to the sixth infraorbital is the dermosphenotic which is nearly trapezoidal though is partially concave anteroventrally due to the edge of the orbit. The last infraorbital has a ridge that runs into the dermosphenotic which in turn has at least three nodes. This represents where the infraorbital sensory canal connects to the otic sensory canal. The rest of the dorsal edge of the orbit is formed by the two supraorbitals. The anterior supraorbital is larger than the posterior and is in contact with the first infraorbital. A total of six suborbitals run in a single row posterior to the infraorbitals and dermosphenotic. All of these bones are around the same size and range between rectangular and subrectangular though show a bit of variation. The sixth and dorsal-most bone in the series is the largest.

The preopercle of Khoratichthys is a long, thin bone that runs along almost the entire length of the suborbital series: resulting in the bone being slightly curved. A total of seven pores run along the length of the bone which represent the preopercular sensory canal. The opercle is a large, almost square-shaped bone though it is slightly deeper than it is wide. The ventral margin of the bone connects with the dorsal margin of the subopercle, resulting in the dorsal edge of the latter bone to be extremely concave. In contrast to this, the ventral edge of the bone is very convex with this largely being due to the anterior portion of the bone being much thinner than the posterior. The ascending process of the bone only reaches about half way up the opercle. The interopercle is in contact with the lower anterior portion of the subopercle through a vertical contact. It is a triangular bone that deepens posteriorly, being about the same depth as the subopercle. A majority of the branchiostegal rays are not visible in the specimen but two are partially preserved under the subopercle. Two additional bones interpteted as supraneural ossifications are located just behind the skull.

=== Postcranium ===
The pectoral girdle of Khoratichthys is fairly well preserved with most of the bones being visible between the part and counterpart. Both the cleithrum and postcleithrum are preserved but hard to interpret in the specimens, especially the anterior portion of the cleithrum. Above the cleithrum is the supracleithrum which has a ridge close to its anterior edge that most likely correlates to the supratemporal sensory canal. The posttemporal, a bone located at the top of the girdle, is crescent-shaped. A series of four postcleithra are present with the anterior-most in the series being the smallest. As in other closely related fish like Lepidotus, the pectoral fins of the fish are located towards the bottom of the body. Each fin is twisted at the front and is made up of five unsegmented fin rays. Each of these rays are very long, the largest having a length of 50 millimetres (2.0 in). In front of the pectoral fins there are at least three basal fulcra. Much less is known about the pelvic fins due to their poor preservation but they are located at the midpoint between the pectoral and anal fins. They are in line with the 4th row of scales from those on the ventral midline.

The unpaired fins of Khoratichthys are more completely preserved than the paired fins, being nearly complete. Both the dorsal and anal fins insert just before the caudal peduncle with the former inserting slightly before the latter. The dorsal fin is made up of nine fin rays and was most likely triangular. The first of the rays is unbranched while the others are branched. The bases of each fin ray begins as a long unsegmented portion that progressively decreases on rays further down the fin. At the front of the fin, there is a total of four basal and five fringing fulcra. The anal fin is slightly smaller than the dorsal but is made up of more fin rays, being eleven rather than nine. Similar to the dorsal fin, each ray has a unsegmented base than gets progressive smaller in rays further down in the fin. At the front of the fin, there are three basal and at least three fringing fulcra. Anterior to the anal fin there are two anal scutes. The caudal fin of the fish is made up of eighteen rays: ten on the dorsal lobe and eight on the ventral lobe. Besides the two marginal rays, the fin rays of the caudal fin are segmented. In front of the dorsal lobe there are five scutes, two basal fulcra, and potentially six pairs of fringing fulcra. Fulcra are much less numerous preceding the ventral lobe with there only being one unpaired basal fulcrum, three paired basal fulcra, and at least four fringing fulcra.

Like other lepisosteiforms, the body of Khoratichthys is covered in rhomboid ganoid scales. The exact shape of these scales differ based on where they are on the body. On a majority of the body they are rectangular, taller than they are wide, but become rhomboidal on the caudal peduncle. Each of the scales have a dorsal process that inserts into a socket found in the scale above it. Two pegs are also present on the top and bottom of the anterior edge of each scale, the top being the larger of the two. Along the body, there are a total of thirty-six transverse rows of scales along the body. The largest of these rows, located where the body depth is the greatest, is made up of twenty-three scales. The lobe of the caudal fin is made up of fourteen inverted scales. The dorsal ridge scales on the trunk, eighteen in total, each possess a large backwards-pointing spine. This is also seen on the ventral midline scales but less extreme. The lateral line of Khoratichthys is marked by scales with a single small pore.

== Classification ==
In the original 2016 paper, a phylogenic analyses was done to determine the placement of the fish within Ginglymodi. The general results of the tree disagreed with previous publications in its placement of Macrosemiidae and members of both Semionotiformes and Callipurbeckiidae. Khoratichthys itself was placed in a polytomy within Lepisosteiformes containing it, Neosemionotus, Lophionotus, and a clade containing Lepidotes and other more derived ginglymodians like gars. The reason for this polytomy is most likely the fact that the three more basal taxa within the polytomy lack information on the relationship between the quadrate and metapterygoid along with the articulation between the symplectic and quadrate. The phylogenic analysis from the paper can be found below:

- - - Notagogus
    - Macrosemius rostratus
  - - Luoxiongichthys hyperdorsalis
    - - Semionotus bergeri
      - - - Callipurbeckiidae
            - Callipurbeckia minor
            - - Macrosemimimus fegerti
              - Paralepidotus ornatus
              - - Sangiorgioichthys aldae
                - - Semiolepis brembanus
                  - Tlayuamichin itztli
          - - Lepisosteiformes
              - Neosemionotus puntanus
              - Khoratichthys gibbus
              - Lophionotus sanjuanensis
              - - Lepidotes gigas
                - - Isanichthys palustris
                  - Isanichthys lertboosi
                  - - Scheenstia zappi
                    - - Thaiichthys palustris
                      - - - Pliodetes nigeri
                          - Araripelepidotes temnurus
                        - - - Dentilepisosteus laevis
                            - Obaichthys decoratus
                          - - Lepisosteidae

== Paleoenvironment ==
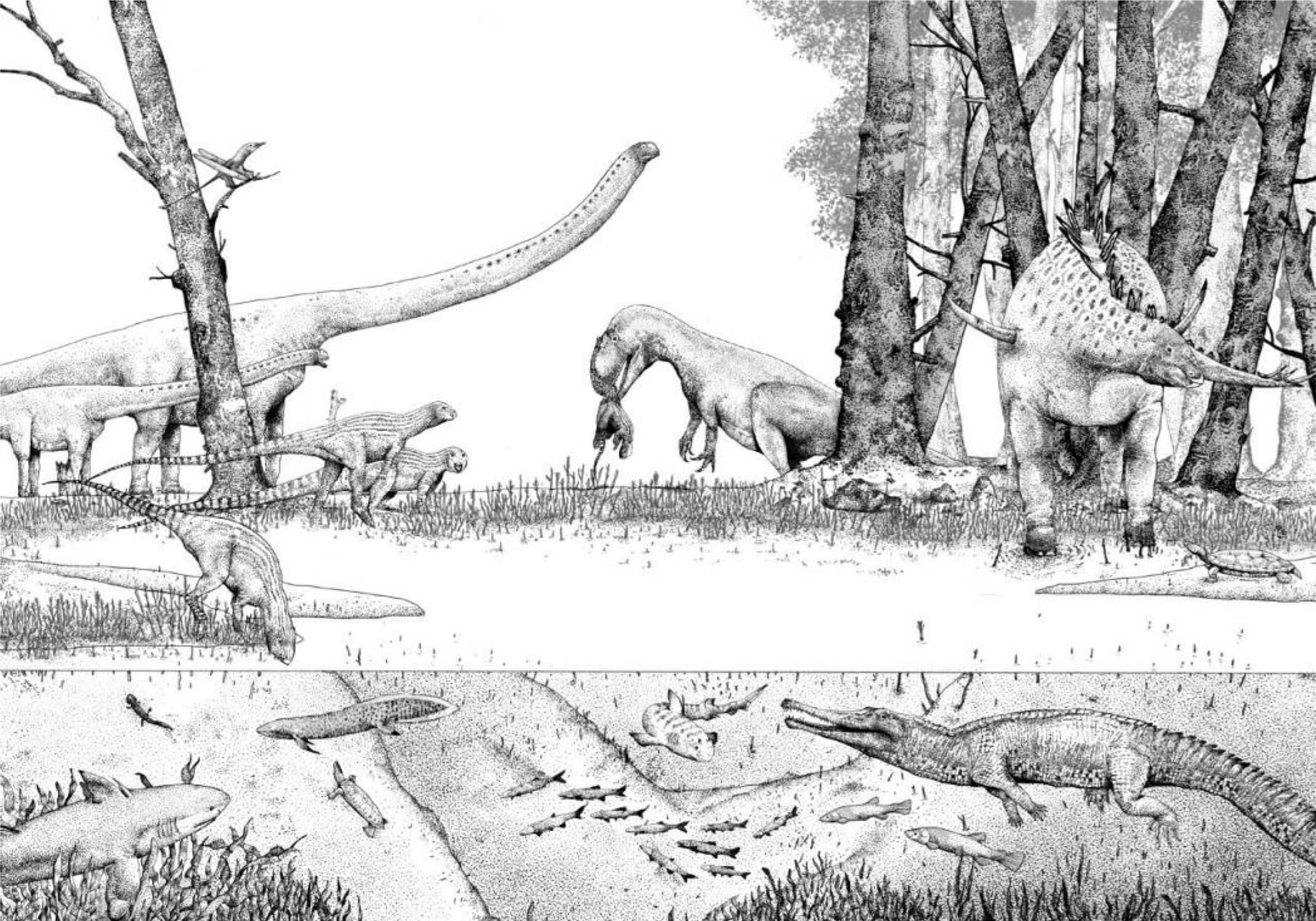
A representation of the paleoenvironment of the Phu Kradung Formation

Based on the lithology of the Phu Kradung Formation, the environment was most likely a floodplain dominated by lakes with meandering and braided rivers found throughout. Though macroflora has been rarely found within the formation, one of the pollen morphotaxa found has been found in association with Dicksoniaceae, Lycopodiaceae, and Cheirolepidiaceae at other formations. Wood morphotaxa also suggest a changing climates throughout the formation's deposition. Xenoxylon is a common indicator of cool and wet boreal climates. In contrast to this, both Shimakuroxylon and Brachyoxylon are thought to be associated with warmer, subtropical climates. The ichthyofauna of the formation is made up of other ginglymodians, lungfish, and a number of hybodonts. A number of semiaquatic animals like turtles, teleosaurs, pholidosaurs, and brachyopids. The biota, however, is best known for its dinosaur fauna which was made up of mamenchisaurids, stegosaurs, metriacanthosaurids, a tyrannosauroid, and a neornithischian.
