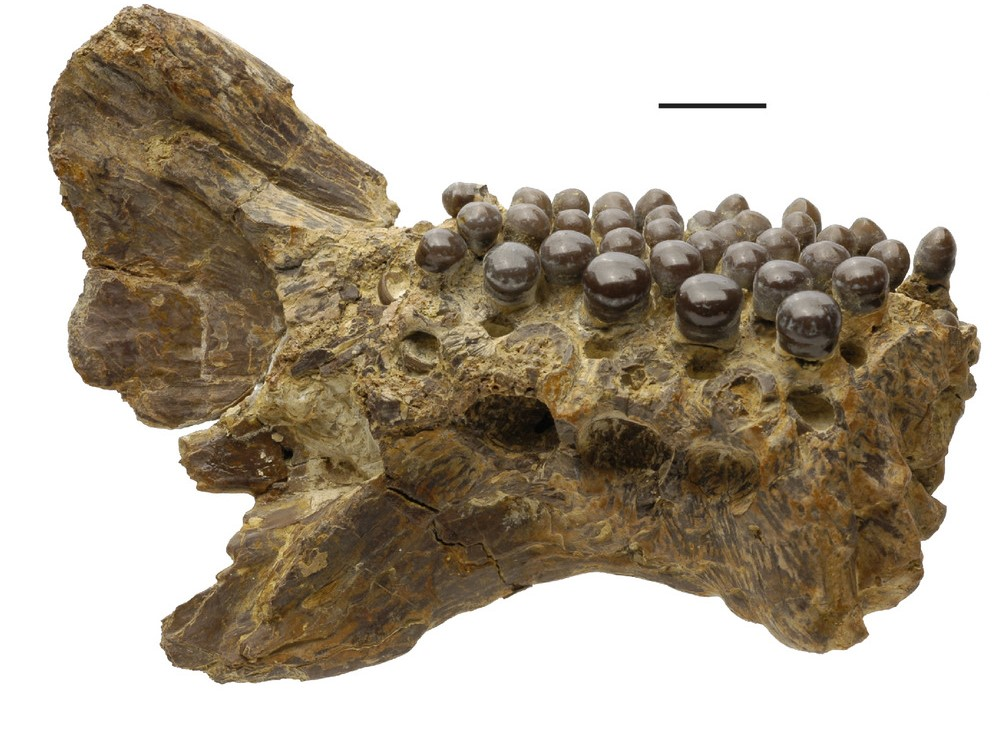
- Lower jaw with teeth of Scheenstia sp. scale bar = 1 cm

Scientific classification
- Kingdom: Animalia
- Phylum: Chordata
- Class: Actinopterygii
- Clade: Ginglymodi
- Order: Lepisosteiformes
- Family: †Lepidotidae
- Genus: †Scheenstia; López-Arbarello & Sferco, 2011

Type species
- Scheenstia zappi López-Arbarello & Sferco, 2011

Species
- †S. mantelli (Agassiz, 1833); †S. laevis (Agassiz, 1837); †S. maximus (Wagner, 1863); †S. decoratus (Wagner, 1863); †S. degenhardti (Branco, 1885); †S. hauchecornei (Wagner, 1863); †S. zappi López-Arbarello & Sferco, 2011; †S. bernissartensis (Traquair, 1911)

= Scheenstia =

Scheenstia Temporal range: Late Jurassic–Early Cretaceous, 150–125 Ma
- Fossil specimen of S. maximus

Extinct genus of fishes

Scheenstia is an extinct genus of neopterygian ray-finned fish from the Late Jurassic–Early Cretaceous of Europe. Fossils have been found in both marine and freshwater environments.

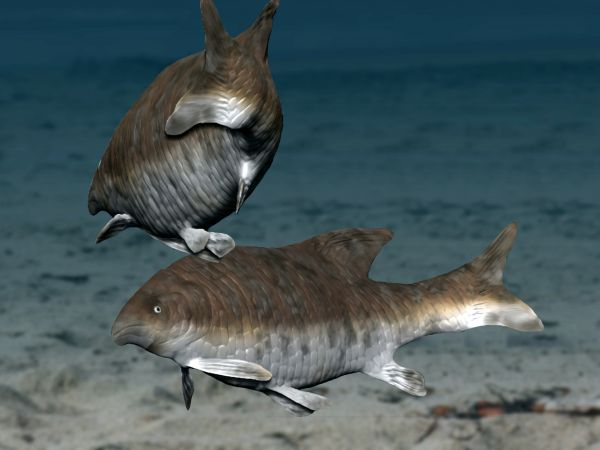
Life restoration of S. maxima

Most species of the genus were previously referred to the related genus Lepidotes, but most Late Jurassic–Early Cretaceous species of that genus have since been re-classified as Scheenstia following detailed phylogenetic analysis. It is a member of Lepisosteiformes meaning that its closest living relatives are gars. The teeth of Scheenstia are low and rounded, and were likely used for crushing hard shelled organisms (durophagy). The teeth were replaced synchronously, undergoing a 180 degree rotation during development, unique among vertebrates. It was probably a relatively slow swimmer that was capable of making fine movements in order to remove prey from the seafloor. One species, the marine Scheenstia maximus from the Late Jurassic of Germany, could reach body lengths in excess of 1.5 metres (4.9 ft), likely up to 2 metres (6.6 ft).

The teeth of Scheenstia were historically known as toadstones, and were attributed magical and medicinal properties in medieval Europe, with some being incorporated into jewelry, including on a crown held at Aachen Cathedral used to crown Charles IV, Holy Roman Emperor.

== Classification ==
Scheenstia is related to the genus Lepidotes, with both genera placed in the family Lepidotidae. Lepidotes has been one of the greatest actinopterygian wastebasket taxa, with one 2012 study finding species referrable to a minimum of three different and distantly related genera. Scheenstia is also related to Isanichthys. A cladogram showing the relations of Neopterygii was published in the review, and a simplified version labelling the previous species of Lepidotes is shown here.

- Ginglymodi
  - Semionotiformes
    - Sangiorgioichthys
    - - Macrosemiidae
        - Luoxiongichthys
        - - - Notagogus
            - Macrosemius
          - Propterus
      - - Semionotidae
          Semionotus
        - Callipurbeckiidae
          - Semiolepis
          - - Paralepidotus
            - - Macrosemimimus
              - - Tlayuamichin
                - Callipurbeckia (incl. L. minor, L. notopterus, L. tendagurensis)
  - Lepisosteiformes
    - Neosemionotus
    - - - Scheenstia (incl. L. mantelli, L. laevis, L. maximus, L. decoratus, L. degenhardti, L. hauchecorni)
        - Lepidotes
      - - Isanichthys
        - Lepisosteoidei

Some studies have suggested that Scheenstia may be paraphyletic with respect to the lepidotid genera Camerichthys and Isanichthys.
