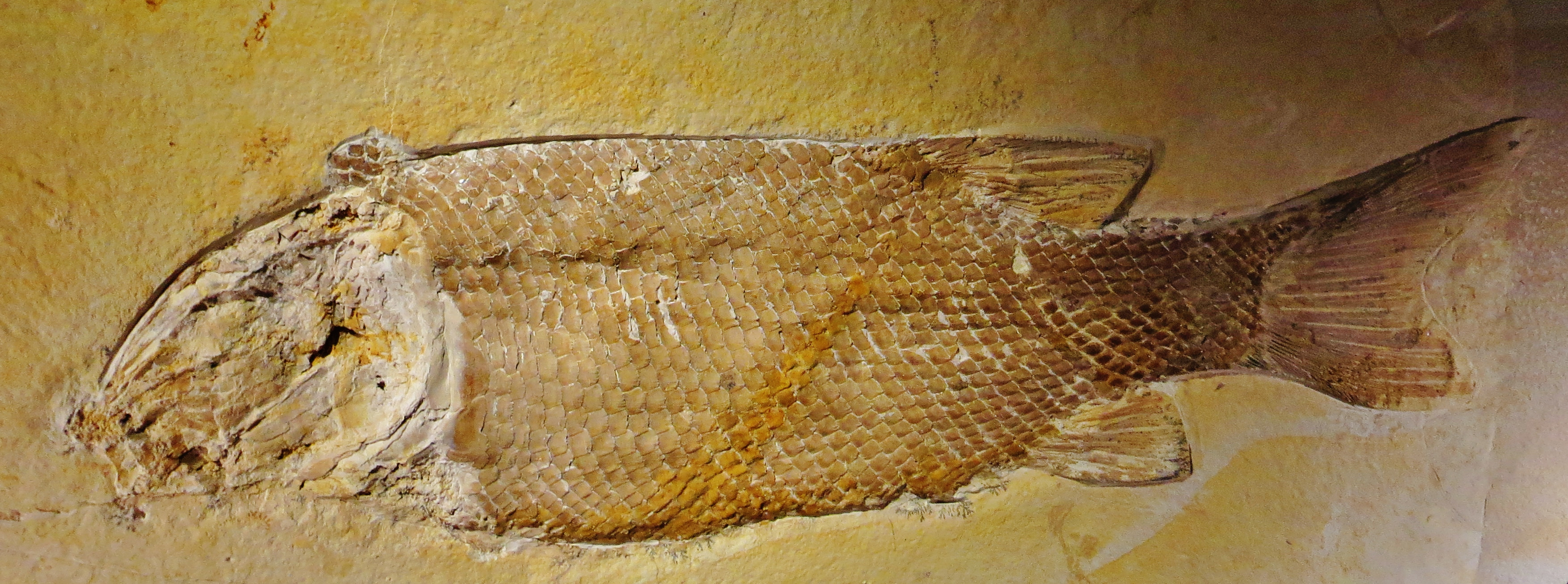
- Specimen of Callipurbeckia, the type genus of the family
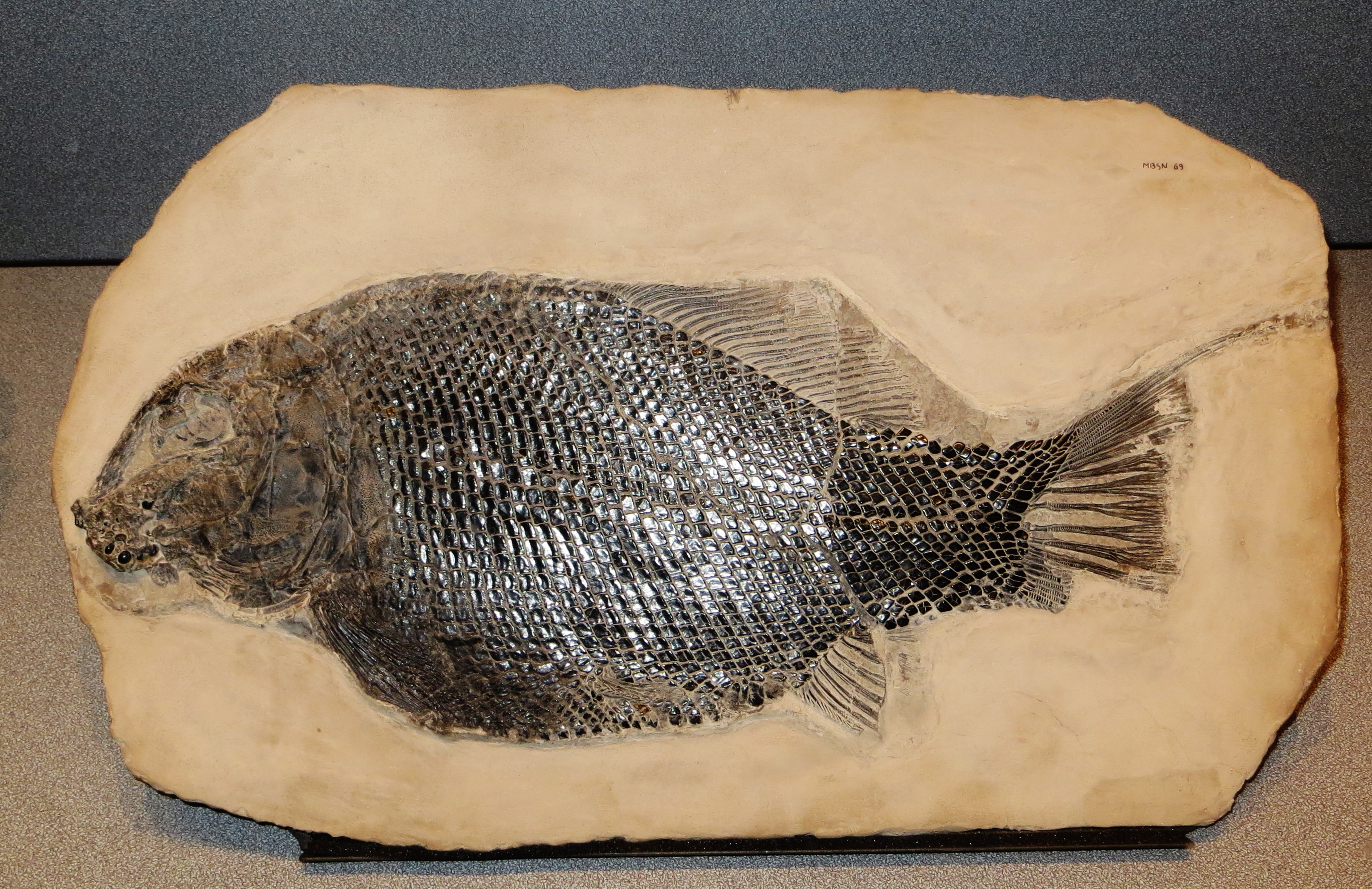
- A specimen of Paralepidotus, one of the oldest members of the family

Scientific classification
- Kingdom: Animalia
- Phylum: Chordata
- Class: Actinopterygii
- Clade: Ginglymodi
- Order: †Semionotiformes
- Family: †Callipurbeckiidae; López-Arbarello, 2012

Type genus
- Callipurbeckia López-Arbarello 2012

Genera
- Callipurbeckia; Macrosemimimus; Occitanichthys; Paralepidotus; Semiolepis; Tlayuamichin

= Callipurbeckiidae =

Callipurbeckiidae Temporal range: Norian-Albian 216.6–100 Ma

Extinct family of fishes

Callipurbeckiidae is an extinct family of marine semiontiform ginglymodians that ranged from the Late Triassic to the Early Cretaceous. A majority of known members of the family have been found throughout western Europe though the youngest member, Tlayuamichin, was found in Mexico. Callipurbeckiids were medium-sized, fusiform fish that were overall similar in morphology to other ginglymodians. Like other members of the group, these fish were durophagous. Their exact placement within Semiontiformes is not fully agreed upon but more recent publications place them as a most basal family within the clade.

== History ==
Though the coining of the family is fairly recent, a majority of fish belonging to Callipurbeckiidae were first described throughout the late 19th century. As with a number of other groups, a majority of the earlier known genera were at one point assigned to the genus Lepidotes, Semionotus, or both. As with numerous other genera, all taxa now within the family were also placed in Semionotidae due to its poor definition. The naming of genera now belonging to the family began during the early 20th century when Paralepidotus ornatus, a species with a complex taxonomic history, was coined by Ernst Stolley in 1919. At around the same time Arthur Smith Woodward revised Lepidotes minor, a species described by Louis Agassiz in 1833, as a part of a description of fish from England. This species was then moved to the genus Semionotus in a review of the genus by Amy Reed McCune in 1986.

Before 2012, two genera that would be eventually be placed in the family were named. The first of these was in 2008 when Cristina Lombardo and Andrea Tintori named Semiolepis based on material from the Zorzino Limestone. The second of these, Tlayuamichin, was named by Adriana López-Arbarello and Jesus Alvarado-Ortega in 2011 based on material from the Tlayúa Quarry. These two taxa now represent some of the oldest and youngest records of the family. The family itself was coined in a 2012 phylogenetic assessment of Ginglymodi by Adriana López-Arbarello. As a part of this publication, multiple species of Lepidotes, including L. minor, were placed in the genus Callipurbeckia based on phylogenic results from the publication. A genus from Jurassic Europe described by Kerstin M. Schröder and coauthors earlier that year was also placed within the family. Since the coining in 2012, a single new genus assigned has been assigned to the family. In 2016, López-Arbarello and coauthors named Occitanichthys based on material from the Canjuers Lagerstätte.

== Description ==
The general anatomy of members of Callipurbeckiidae is generally similar to other more basal members of both Semionotiformes and Lepisosteiformes. Like a number of other groups, the most defining features of the family are seen in the skull. All members of the family are small to medium-sized fusiform fish with members usually having a body length of 30–50 centimetres (12–20 in).

=== Skull ===
The head of callipurbeckiids is similar to a majority of other ginglymodians in having a triangular head that rapidly slopes downwards anteriorily. Unlike a majority of other families within Semionotiformes, the maxilla in most members of the family lacks teeth. An exception to this is with basal members like Semiolepis which have slightly backwards-pointing teeth on the bone. All members of the family have teeth used to crush hard-shelled animals. While the bottom dentition of the fish are largely peg-like, much less with known about the premaxillary teeth in most general. Those seen in Semiolepis are the same morphology as is seen on the lower dentition. Based on alveoli on later taxa such as Tlayuamichin, they were likely much smaller than those seen on the dentary. The vomer of the fish also have teeth which range from peg to button-shaped, depending on the genus.

One of the most diagnostic features seen in Callipurbeckiidae is a process on the subopercle. It is located on the dorsal edge of the bone and extends to about half the height of the operculum. A feature seen in most later members is the presence of two suborbitals, bones located between the circumorbital and opercular series.

=== Postcranium ===
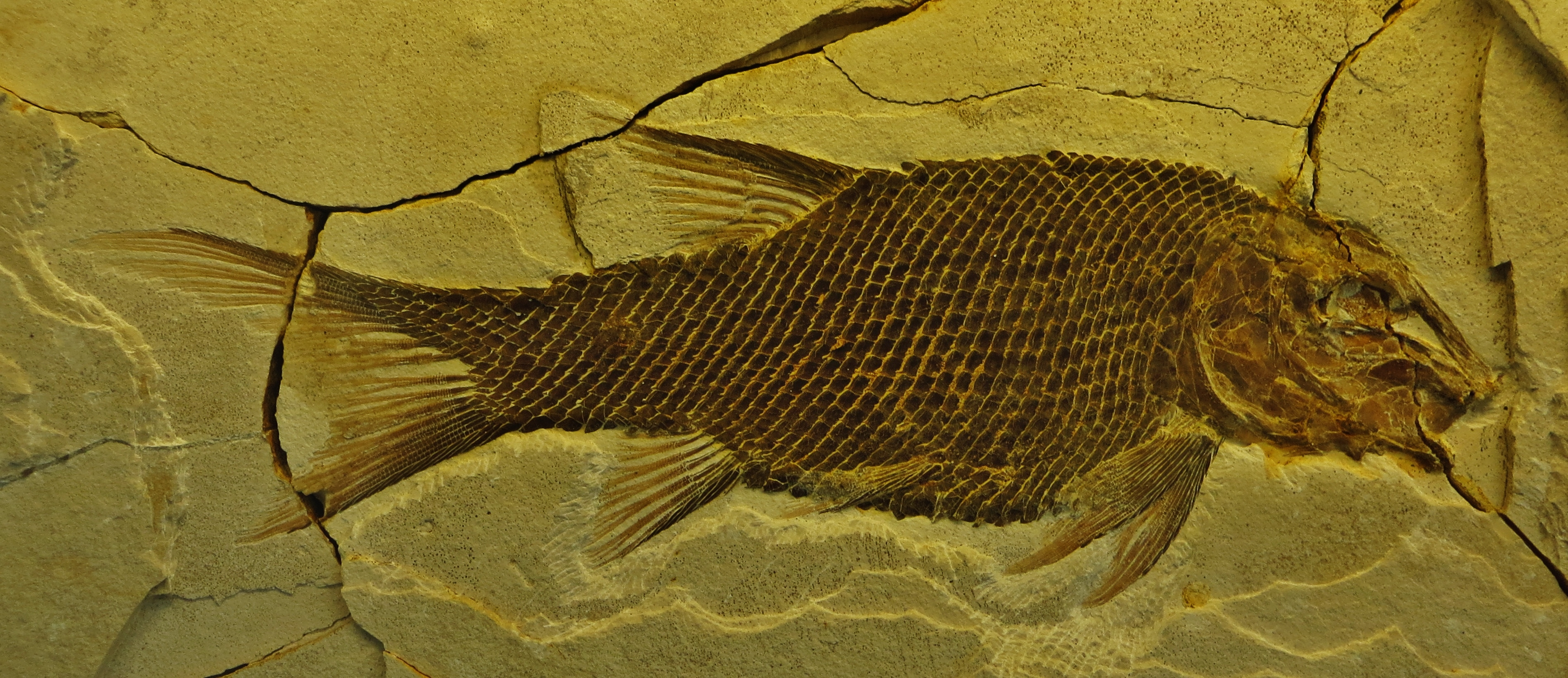
Macrosemimimus fegerti, a member of the family known from the well known Solnhofen Archipelago.

The pectoral girdle is largely similar to other members of the order though the supracleithrum bears a concave facet that is used for articulation with the posttemporal. The pectoral fins of the fish are located low on the body and made up of rays that each have a long unbranched segment at their base. The pelvic fins are located near the back of the trunk, resulting in it being closer to the insertion of the dorsal fin than the anal fin. The fish have a single dorsal fin placed nearly parallel to the anal fin. Both of these fins are almost triangular with the anal fin being slightly smaller than the dorsal. The dorsal and anal fins are both located just in front of the caudal penduncle. Each of these fins have large fulcra on their leading edge. The shape of the caudal fin in callipurbeckiids differs between genera with it ranging between triangular and developed heterocercal. Large fulcra are present on the dorsal and ventral edges of the caudal fin.

As in other ginglymodians, the body of callipurbeckiids is covered in thick rhomboid scales. Some of these, such as the dorsal ridge scales of Occitanichthys, have large spines. Pegs located on the dorsal and ventral pegs used for articulation between scales is seen in later members. One genus within the family, Tlayuamichin, has a modified pectoral scale with spines located above the pectoral fin.

== Classification ==
=== External phylogeny ===
The exact placement of Callipurbeckiidae differs between publications though all phylogenic analyses place the family within Semionotiformes. When coined by López-Arbarello in 2012, the family was placed as the sister group to the genus Semionotus. However, this relationship was noted to be weakly supported at the time. A later 2016 publication by López-Arbarello and Wencker found the family to instead be the outgroup to a clade containing Macrosemiidae and Semionotidae. This contrasted results from previous publications that found Macrosemiidae to be the basal-most family of the three. Even with this being the case, the authors found this to be a much more stable position for Macrosemiidae. In 2020, Lionel Cavin and coauthors published a description of Scheenstia bernissartensis (previously placed in the genus Lepidotes) which included a phylogenic analysis. Unlike both of the previous results, Cavin and coauthors found Semionotidae to be the outgroup of the three families. This arrangement of the order has been found in other more recent publications such as the 2019 paper by Guang-Hui Xu et al. along with in 2021 by Valéria Gallo et al. Mentioned phylogenies can be found below:

López-Arbarello (2012)

- - Semionotiformes
    - Sangiorgioichthys
    - - - Luoxiongichthys
        - Macrosemiidae
    - - Callipurbeckiidae

López-Arbarello & Wencker (2016)

- - Semionotiformes
    - Luoxiongichthys
    - - Sangiorgioichthys
      - - Kyphosichthys
        - - - Semionotidae
            - Macrosemiidae
          - - Callipurbeckiidae

Cavin et al. (2020)

- - Semionotiformes
    - Lepidhoyas
    - - Semionotidae
      - - Macrosemiidae
        - Callipurbeckiidae

In 2025, Guang-Hui and coauthors published a redescription of Guizhoubrachysomus which resulted in it being reassigned to the family Dapediidae. The phylogenic results, unlike other publications, placed the family within Semionotiformes. Similar to some publications, the results of the phylogenic analysis placed members of Callipurbeckiidae as near members of Semionotidae (with Semiolepis being a polyphyletic genus). Also as in other analyses, Macrosemiidae was found to be a derived family of the order though is placed as the sister group to Dapediidae. The phylogenic analysis from this paper can be found below:

- - Semionotiformes
    - Lophionotus
    - - Semionotus elegans
      - - - Macrosemimimis
          - Tlayuamichin
        - - Semionotus brembanus
          - - Macrosemiidae
            - Dapediidae

=== Internal phylogeny ===
In the original publication, Callipurbeckiidae was defined as all genera that are more closely related to Callipurbeckia than Semionotus, Macrosemius, Lepidotes, or Lepisosteus. Even with this being the case, López-Arbarello did define specific combination of features in the group such as presence of orbital sensory canal and small parietals. This publication found Paralepidotus and Semiolepis to be the basal-most members of the family. The three most derived members of the family then form a clade containing two groups. The first of these only contains the two species of Macrosemimimus and the other contains both Callipurbeckia and Tlayuamichin. In the 2016 description of Occitanichthys, the same relationships were seen but with the described genus being placed within the clade containing Callipurbeckia and Tlayuamichin. However, a 2021 analysis by Valéria Gallo et al. resulted in different internal relationships. In this analysis, Occitanichthys was determined to be the basal-most member, followed by Macrosemimimus. The other genera form a clade containing two branches like in the original publication. These contain the original basal-most two taxa from the 2012 paper and the clade containing Callipurbeckia and Tlayuamichin. Yet another different result was determined by Detlev Thies et al. in 2026, though it is more similar to earlier publications. While the same basal-most taxa were seen as in papers by López-Arbarello, the branches than make up the more derived members of the family differ. These branched are formed by Callipurbeckia and Macrosemimimus; while the other is formed by Occitanichthys and Tlayuamichin. Some of these arrangements of the internal relationships of the family can be found below:

López-Arbarello (2012)

- - Callipurbeckiidae
    - Paralepidotus
    - - Semiolepis
      - - Macrosemimimus
        - - Callipurbeckia
          - Tlayuamichin

Gallo et al. (2021)

- - Callipurbeckiidae
    - Occitanichthys
    - - Macrosemimimus
      - - - Paralepidotus
          - Semiolepis
        - - Callipurbeckia
          - Tlayuamichin

Thies et al. (2026)

- - Callipurbeckiidae
    - - Paralepidotus
      - Semiolepis
    - - - Callipurbeckia
        - Occitanichthys
      - - Macrosemimimus
        - Callipurbeckia

== Paleoecology ==
Based on the anatomy of callipurbeckiids, they were slow swimming but maneuverable fish that lived near the sea floor. The dentition of the fish also suggests that these fish were durophagous. The most well understood genus ecologically, Paralepidotus, is known to have fed on the bivalve Modiolus based on coprolites. Throughout its ontogeny, the fish became more durophagous based on the fact that the teeth of larger individuals were stouter than those seen in smaller individuals.
