= Toadstone =

Mythical gemstone, actually a fossilised fish tooth

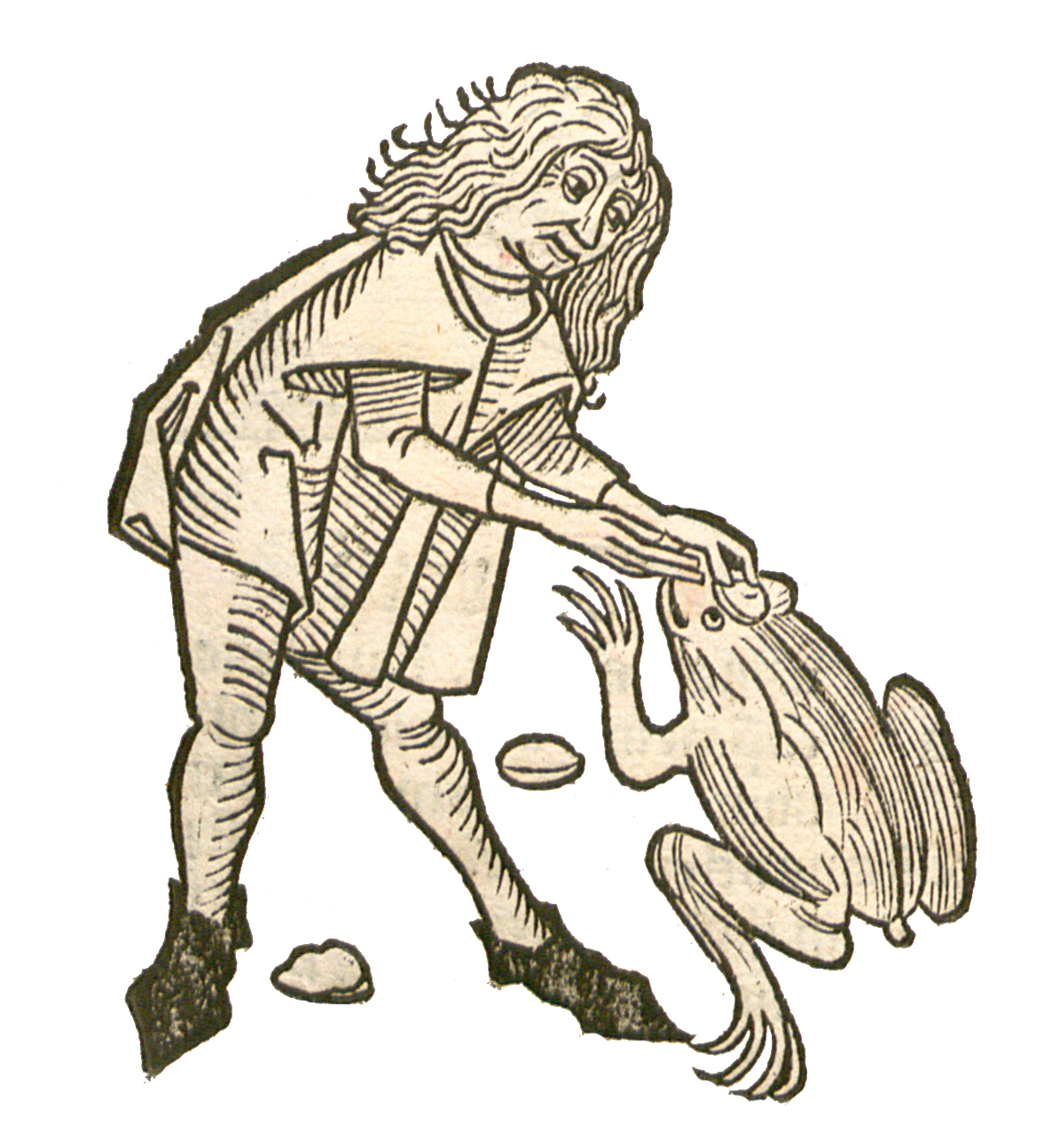
Collection of a Toadstone, illustrated in Hortus Sanitatis, published in Mainz in 1491.

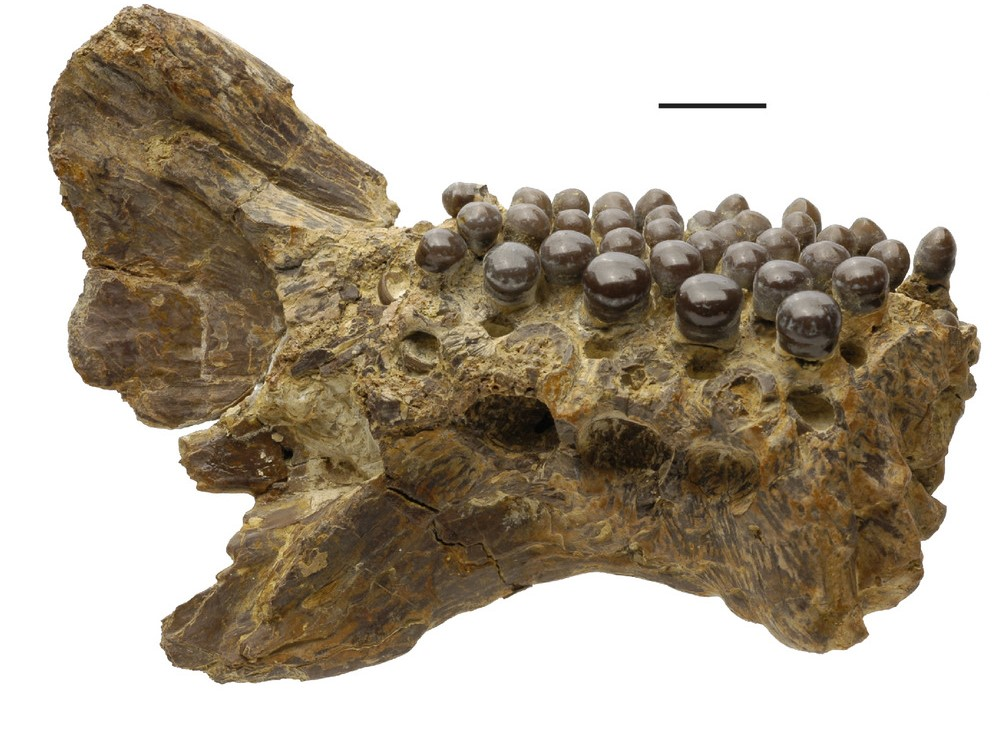
Lower jaw fragment of Scheenstia, showing the teeth in situ

The toadstone, also known as bufonite (from Latin bufo, "toad") and crapaud-stone, is a fossil gem that was once believed to be found in the heads of toads, and ascribed magical powers. It was supposed to be an antidote to poison and in this it is like batrachite, supposedly formed in the heads of frogs. Toadstones were actually the button-like fossilised teeth of Scheenstia (previously Lepidotes), an extinct genus of ray-finned fish from the Jurassic and Cretaceous periods. They appeared to be "stones that are perfect in form" and were set by European jewellers into magical rings and amulets from Medieval times until the 18th century.

== Beliefs ==
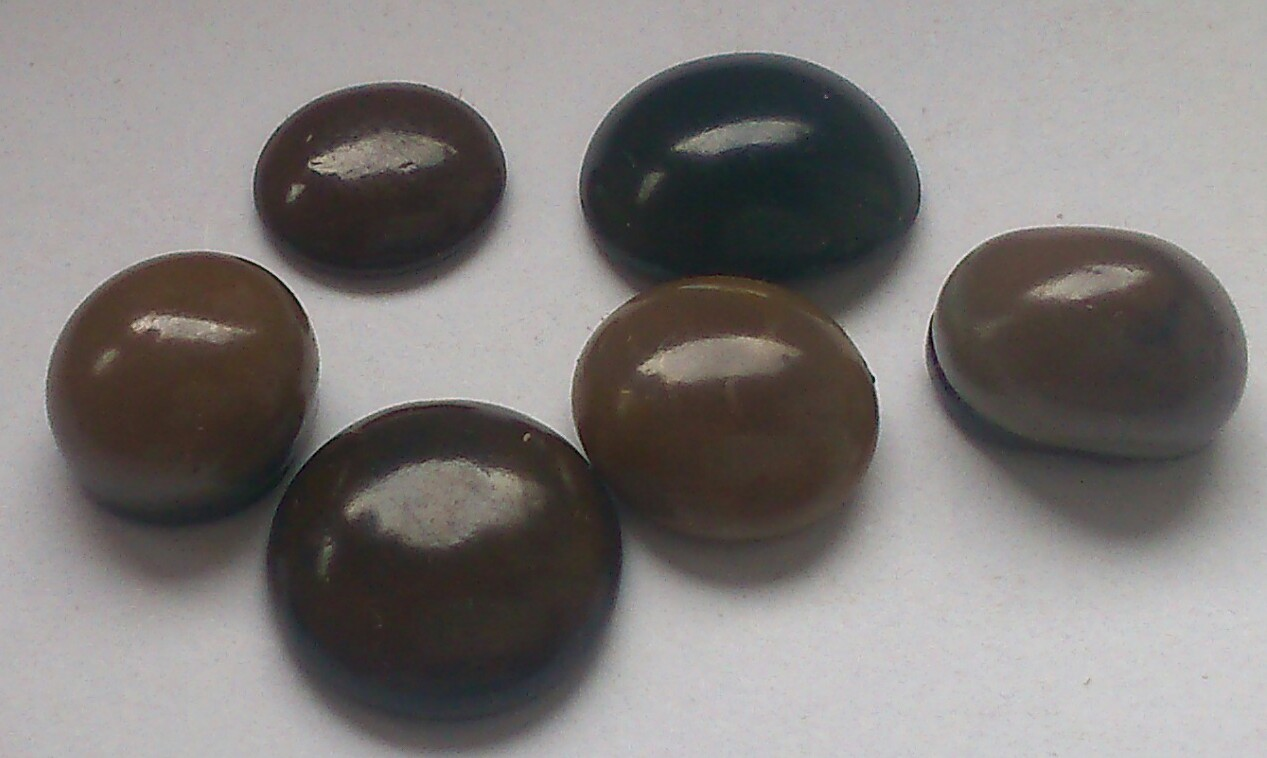
Toadstones from Jurassic sediments in Oxfordshire, England

From ancient times people associated the fossils with jewels that were set inside the heads of toads. The toad has poison glands in its skin, so it was naturally assumed that they carried their own antidote and that this took the form of a magical stone. They were first recorded by Pliny the Elder in the first century.

Like the fossilised shark teeth known as tonguestones, toadstones were thought to be antidotes for poison and were also used to treat epilepsy. As early as the 14th century, people began to adorn jewelry with toadstones for their magical abilities. In their folklore, a toadstone was required to be removed from an old toad while the creature was still alive. 17th century naturalist Edward Topsell wrote that this could be done by setting the toad on a piece of red cloth.

The true toadstone was taken by contemporary jewellers to be no bigger than the nail of a hand and they varied in colour from a whitish brown through green to black, depending on where they were buried. They were supposedly most effective against poison when worn against the skin, on which occasion they were thought to heat up, sweat and change colour. If a person were bitten by a venomous creature a toadstone would be touched against the affected part to effect a cure. Alternatively Johannes de Cuba, in his book Gart der Gesundheit of 1485, claimed that toadstone would help with kidney disease and earthly happiness.

Loose toadstones were discovered among other gemstones in the Elizabethan Cheapside Hoard and there are surviving toadstone rings in the Ashmolean Museum and the British Museum.

== Allusions in literature ==
The toadstone is alluded to by Duke Senior in Shakespeare's As You Like It (1599), in Act 2, Scene 1, lines 12 to 14:

Sweet are the uses of adversity;
Which, like the toad, ugly and venomous,
Wears yet a precious jewel in his head.

In James Branch Cabell's short story "Balthazar's Daughter" (collected in The Certain Hour) and its subsequent play adaptation The Jewel Merchants, Alessandro de Medici attempts to seduce Graciosa by listing various precious jewels in his possession, including "jewels cut from the brain of a toad".

In the fifth book of Emily Rodda's fantasy series Deltora Quest, the protagonists must retrieve a magical jewel set in the head of a giant toad.

== Jewelry ==
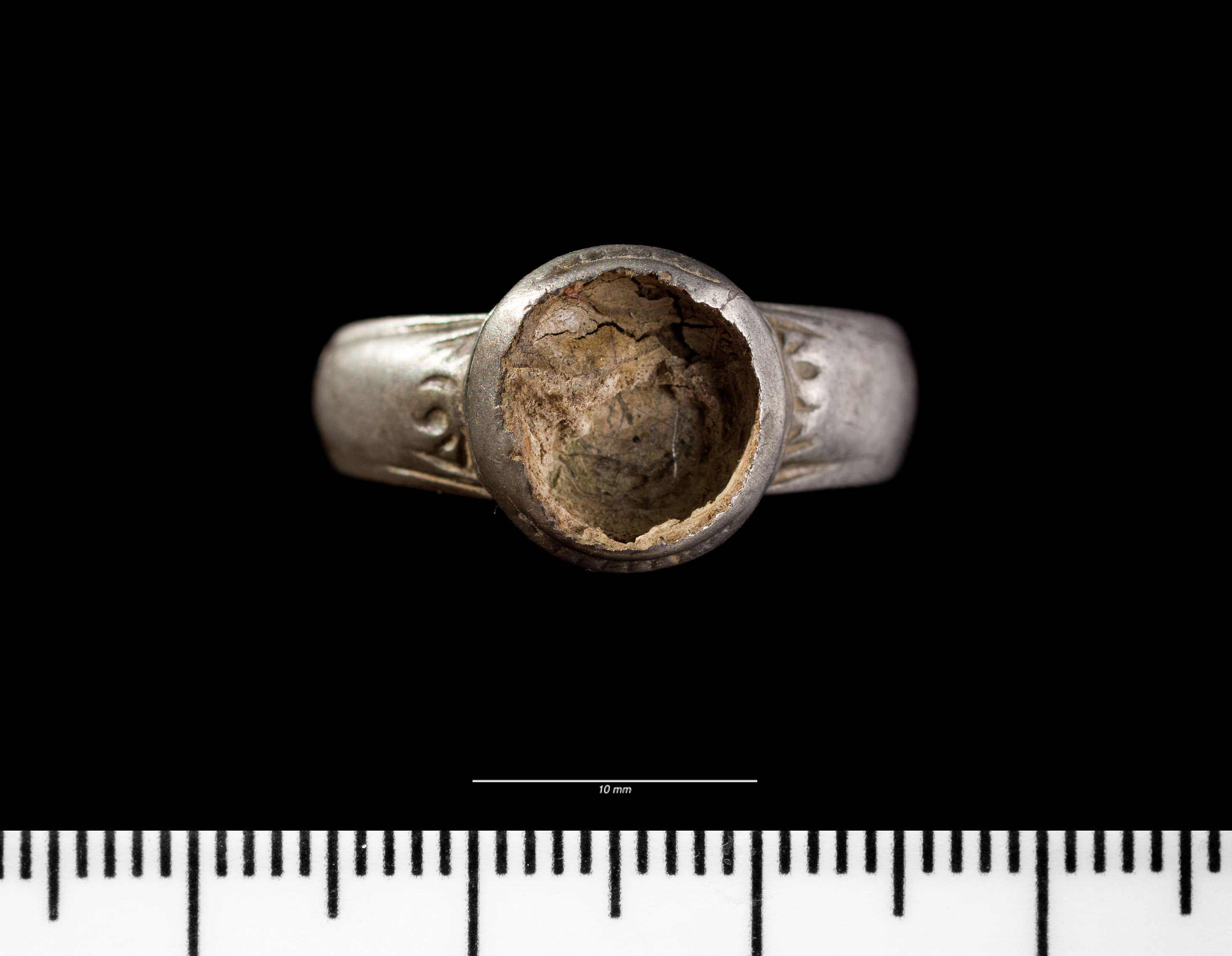
Silver toadstone ring of the fifteenth–sixteenth century

Some toadstones were used in jewelry, including on a crown held at Aachen Cathedral used to coronation Charles IV, Holy Roman Emperor.

== See also ==
- Bezoar
- Biomineralization
