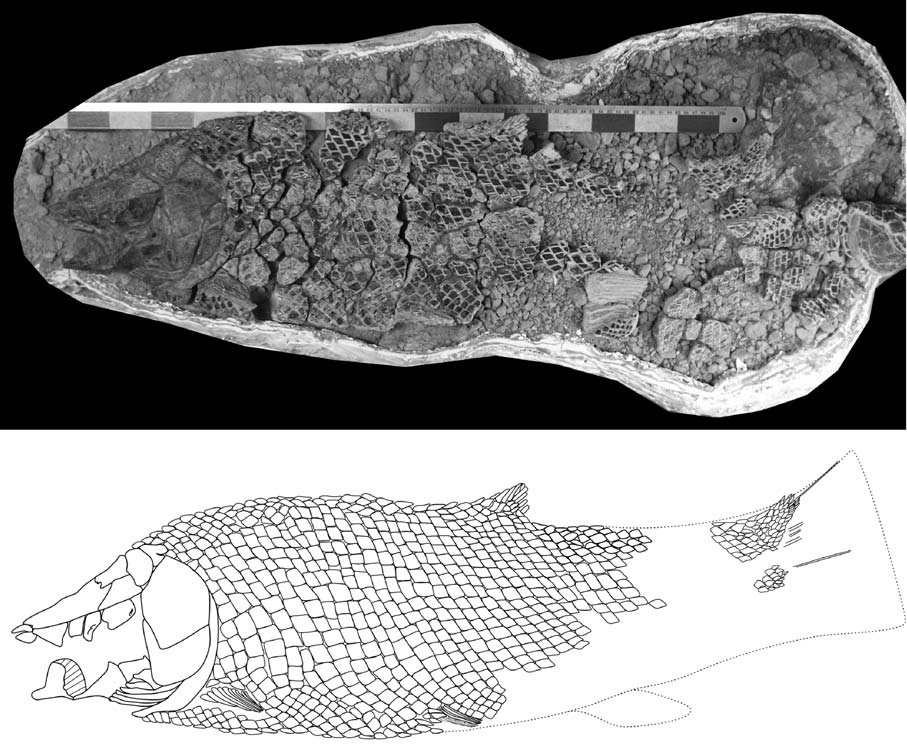
- Holotype of Isanichthys lertboosi

Scientific classification
- Kingdom: Animalia
- Phylum: Chordata
- Class: Actinopterygii
- Clade: Ginglymodi
- Order: Lepisosteiformes
- Family: †Lepidotidae
- Genus: †Isanichthys; Cavin & Suteethorn, 2006

Type species
- Isanichthys palustris Cavin & Suteethorn, 2006

Other species
- I. lertboosi Deesri et al., 2012; I. latifrons (Woodward, 1893); I. luchowensis (Wang, 1974)

= Isanichthys =

Isanichthys Temporal range: Middle Jurassic - Early Cretaceous? (Callovian-Berriasian), 163–145 Ma

Extinct genus of fish

Isanichthys is an extinct genus of freshwater lepidotid ginglymodian fish from the Late Jurassic and Early Cretaceous. Four species are known from Thailand, China and the United Kingdom, two of which were previously classified in genera.

== Taxonomy ==
=== Species ===
- †I. palustris Cavin & Sutheethorn , 2006 - ?Early Cretaceous (Berriasian) of Thailand (Phu Kradung Formation)
- †I. lertboosi Deesri et al, 2012 - Late Jurassic (Tithonian) of Thailand (Phu Kradung Formation)
- †I. latifrons (Woodward, 1893) - Late Jurassic (Callovian) of England (Oxford Clay)
- ?†I. luchowensis (Wang, 1974) - Late Jurassic of Sichuan, China (upper Shaximiao Formation)

=== Phylogeny ===
Isanichthys is a lepidotid closely related to Scheenstia, Camerichthys, Lepidotes, and Mengius.

Below is the cladogram of Lepidotidae based on a Cladistic analysis constructed by Detlev, Kevin and Jörg in 2024.

- Lepidotidae
  - †Isanichthys palustris
  - †Isanichthys lertboosi
  - - - †Mengius acutidens
      - †Lepidotes
    - - †Scheenstia zappi
      - †Camerichthys lunae
      - - †Scheenstia maximus
        - †Scheenstia mantelli

== Description ==
I. palustris, the type species is described from a singular almost-complete specimen found alongside Lepidotes fossils in the Phu Nam Jun locality of the Phu Kradung Formation. I. palustris shows a mixture of semionotiform and lepisosteid-like characteristics, such as the cheek ossification patterns, body shape and dorsal fin. I. lertboosi is represented by four specimens, all from the Phu Noi locality of Phu Kradung, Kalasin. One specimen is an isolated braincase, rarely found in extinct ginglymodians. Characterized by a dermal component of the sphenotic visible by the cheek, One pair of extraspaculars and a small median one.
