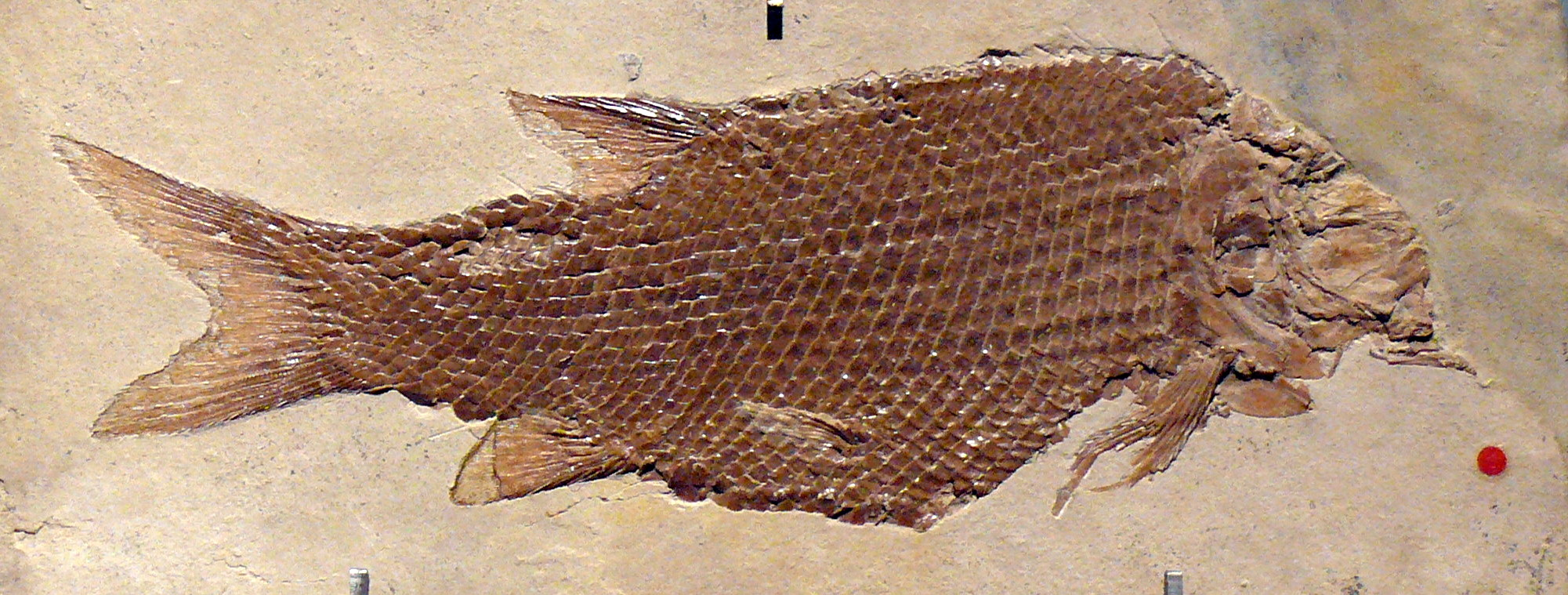
- Fossil specimen of C. notopterus

Scientific classification
- Kingdom: Animalia
- Phylum: Chordata
- Class: Actinopterygii
- Clade: Ginglymodi
- Order: †Semionotiformes
- Family: †Callipurbeckiidae
- Genus: †Callipurbeckia; López-Arbarello, 2012

Type species
- †Lepidotes minor Agassiz, 1833

Species
- †C. minor (Agassiz, 1833) †C. notopterus (Agassiz, 1833) †C. tendaguruensis (Wagner, 1863)

= Callipurbeckia =

Callipurbeckia Temporal range: Late Jurassic—Early Cretaceous, 150–140 Ma

Extinct genus of fishes

Callipurbeckia is an extinct genus of marine semionotiform ray-finned fish from the Late Jurassic and Early Cretaceous periods. Fossils have been found in Germany, Tanzania, and England.

It contains three species, which were previously classified in the related lepisosteiform genus Lepidotes.

- C. minor (Agassiz, 1833) - Earliest Cretaceous (Berriasian) of England (Purbeck Beds)
- C. notopterus (Agassiz, 1835) - Late Jurassic (Tithonian) of Germany (Solnhofen Limestone)
- C. tendaguruensis (Arratia & Schultze, 1999) - Late Jurassic (Tithonian) of Tanzania (Tendaguru Formation)

Potential relatives of Callipurbeckia include Occitanichthys from the Tithonian of France (formerly confused with C. minor) and Tlayuamichin from the Albian of Mexico.

Its name comes from "calli-", from an Ancient Greek word meaning beautiful, and "Purbeck", from the modern-day name of the area where a specimen of it was found.
