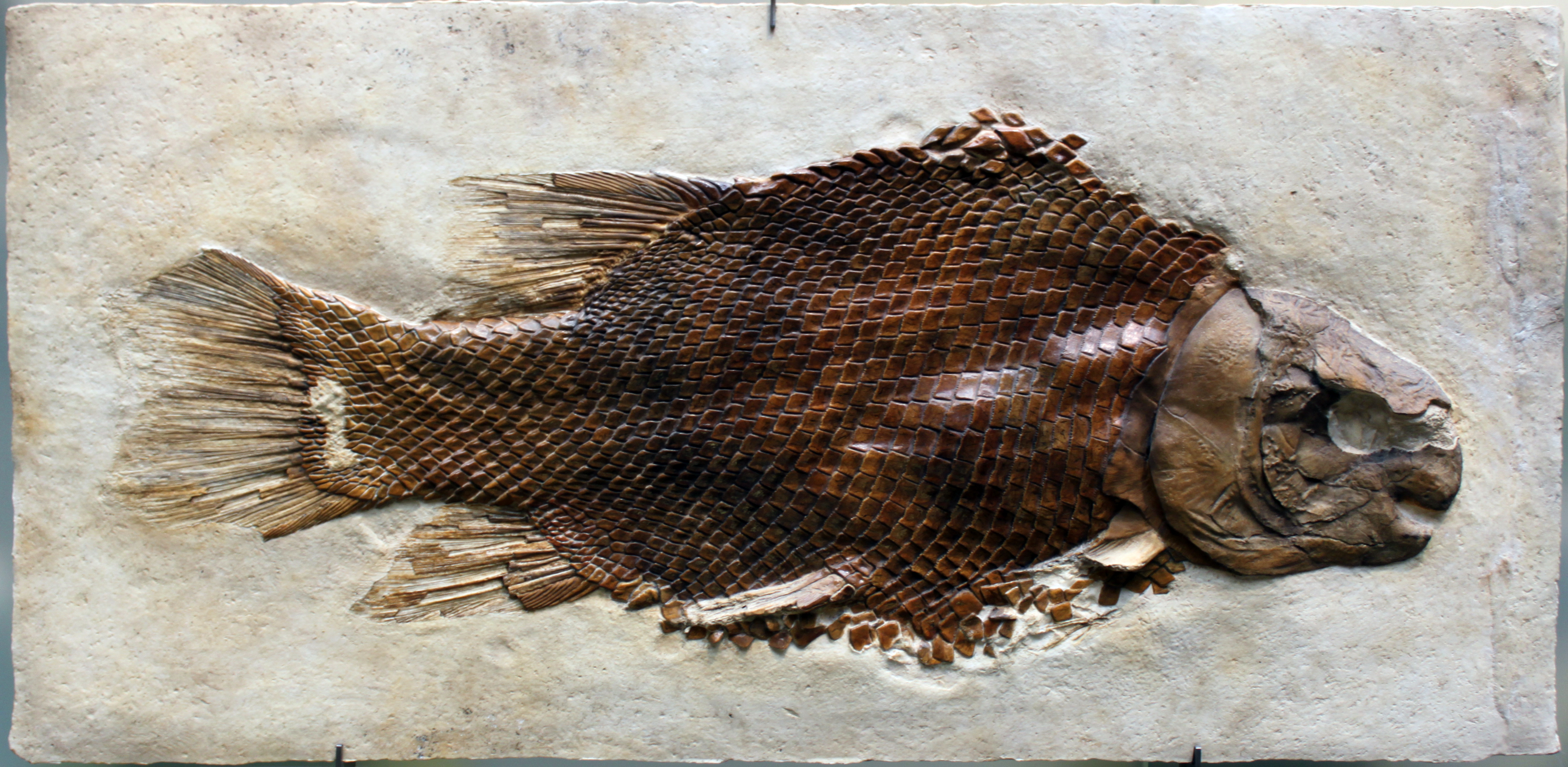
- Fossil of Scheenstia maximus

Scientific classification
- Kingdom: Animalia
- Phylum: Chordata
- Class: Actinopterygii
- Clade: Ginglymodi
- Order: Lepisosteiformes
- Family: †Lepidotidae; Owen, 1860

Genera
- See text

= Lepidotidae =

Lepidotidae Temporal range: Early Jurassic–Early Cretaceous

Extinct family of fish

Lepidotidae is an extinct family of fish, known from the Jurassic and Cretaceous periods. Most species were originally assigned to the genus Lepidotes which was long considered a wastebasket taxon. Cladistic analysis has indicated that they are close relatives of gars, with both being members of the order Lepisosteiformes. Members of the family are known from both marine and freshwater environments. Their bulky body morphology and small median fins suggests that they were slow-moving fish that were capable of performing fine movements in order to grasp prey. Lepidotes sensu stricto had peg-like grasping marginal teeth and crushing palatal teeth, and is known to have consumed small crustaceans, while Scheenstia had low rounded crushing marginal teeth, indicating a durophagous diet.

== Taxonomy ==
- Camerichthys Bermúdez-Rochas & Poyato-Ariza, 2015
- Isanichthys Cavin and Suteethorn, 2006
- Lepidotes Agassiz, 1832
- Mengius Thies et al., 2024
- Scheenstia López-Arbarello & Sferco, 2011
