= Cheapside Hoard =

Hoard of jewellery discovered in London, England

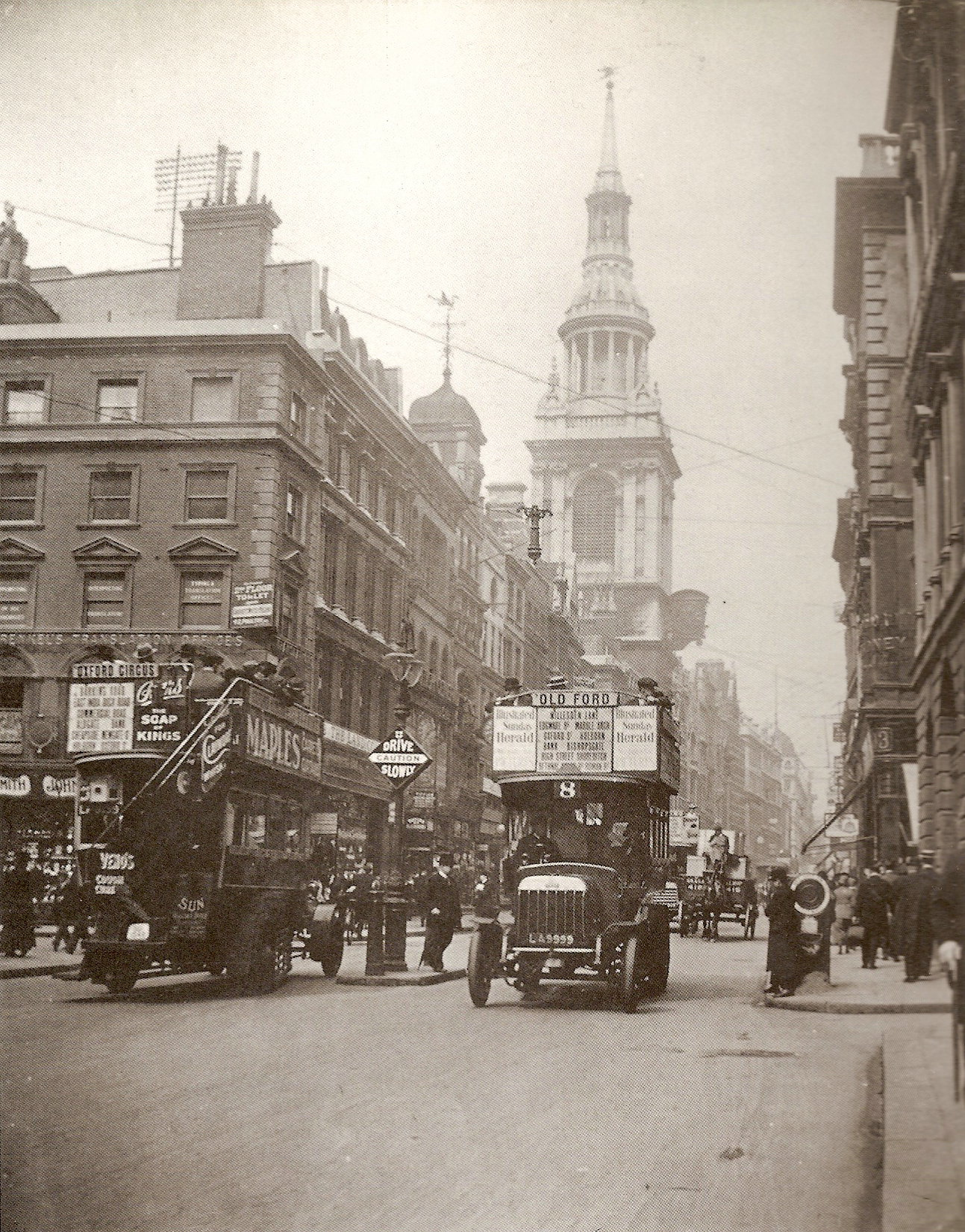
Cheapside pictured in 1909, with the church of St Mary-le-Bow in the background

The Cheapside Hoard is a hoard of jewellery from the late 16th and early 17th centuries, discovered in 1912 by workmen using a pickaxe to excavate in a cellar at 30–32 Cheapside in London, on the corner with Friday Street. They found a buried wooden box containing more than 400 pieces of Elizabethan and Jacobean jewellery, including rings, brooches and chains, with bright coloured gemstones and enamelled gold settings, together with toadstones, cameos, scent bottles, fan holders, crystal tankards and a salt cellar.

Most of the hoard is now in the Museum of London, with some items held by the British Museum and the Victoria and Albert Museum.

== Location ==
The location where the hoard was found is thought to have been the premises of a Jacobean goldsmith, and the hoard is generally considered to have been a jeweller's working stock buried in the cellar during the English Civil War. Cheapside was at the commercial heart of the City of London in the Elizabethan and Jacobean periods, with shops for the sale of luxury goods, including many goldsmiths. The location, a row of houses on the south of Cheapside, to the east of St Paul's Cathedral and to the west of St Mary-le-Bow, was owned by the Worshipful Company of Goldsmiths. Known as Goldsmith's Row, it was formerly the centre of the manufacture and sale of gold and jewellery in medieval London.

Kris Lane has speculated that the hoard may have been brought back to England from the East Indies in 1631, having been assembled by a Dutch jeweller named Gerald Polman. He died on the journey, and his chest of jewels was taken by the carpenter's mate on the ship, Christopher Adams. Adams was eventually forced to surrender the box and its contents to Robert Bertie, 1st Earl of Lindsey, treasurer of the East India Company. Lindsey was involved in litigation with Polman's Dutch heirs, but he died at the Battle of Edgehill in 1642.

Goldsmith's Row was destroyed in the Great Fire of London in 1666. The buildings were reconstructed by the Goldsmiths' Company in 1667, and were redeveloped in 1912. The hoard was discovered by workmen in the remains of an old cellar beneath the building. The site is now beneath One New Change.

== Hoard ==
The hoard demonstrates the international trade in luxury goods in the period, including gemstones from sources across South America, Asia and Europe: emerald from Colombia, topaz and amazonite from Brazil; spinel, iolite and chrysoberyl from Sri Lanka, Indian diamond, Burmese ruby, Afghan lapis lazuli, Persian turquoise, pearls from Bahrain, peridot from the Red Sea; Bohemian and Hungarian opal, garnet and amethyst. Relatively few pearls have survived in good condition after being buried for approximately 350 years.

Large stones were frequently set in box-bezels on enamelled rings. Most of the gemstones are cabochon cut, but there are a few with more modern faceted cuts, including rose cut and star cut. A particularly large Colombian emerald, originally the size of an apple, had been hollowed out to accommodate a Swiss watch movement dated to around 1600, signed by G. Ferlite.

The items include a Byzantine gemstone cameo, a cameo of Queen Elizabeth I, an emerald parrot, and some fake gemstones made of carved and dyed quartz. A small red intaglio stone seal bears the arms of William Howard, 1st Viscount Stafford, dating the burial of the hoard between his ennoblement in November 1640 and the Great Fire of London in September 1666, which destroyed the buildings above. Most of the gold is the "Paris touch" standard of 19.2 carats (80 per cent pure).

== London Museum ==
The workmen who discovered the hoard sold items to a man they knew as "Stoney Jack", the antiques dealer and pawnshop owner George Fabian Lawrence, who frequently paid labourers cash for interesting finds from London building sites. He was appointed by Guildhall Museum to seek out new items for its collection and became Inspector of Excavations for the nascent London Museum in 1911.

The Goldsmiths' Company did not assert their ownership of the finds, and no treasure trove inquest was held. Lewis Vernon Harcourt, 1st Viscount Harcourt provided the funds for the London Museum to purchase most of the Cheapside Hoard, though a few pieces went to the British Museum and the Guildhall Museum, and one gold and enamel chain was purchased by the Victoria and Albert Museum. The finds were exhibited at the London Museum in Kensington in 1914, to great acclaim. The collections of the Guildhall Museum and the London Museum came together when they merged to form the Museum of London in 1975.

The entire hoard was displayed together for the first time in more than 100 years at the Museum of London, from October 2013 to April 2014.
