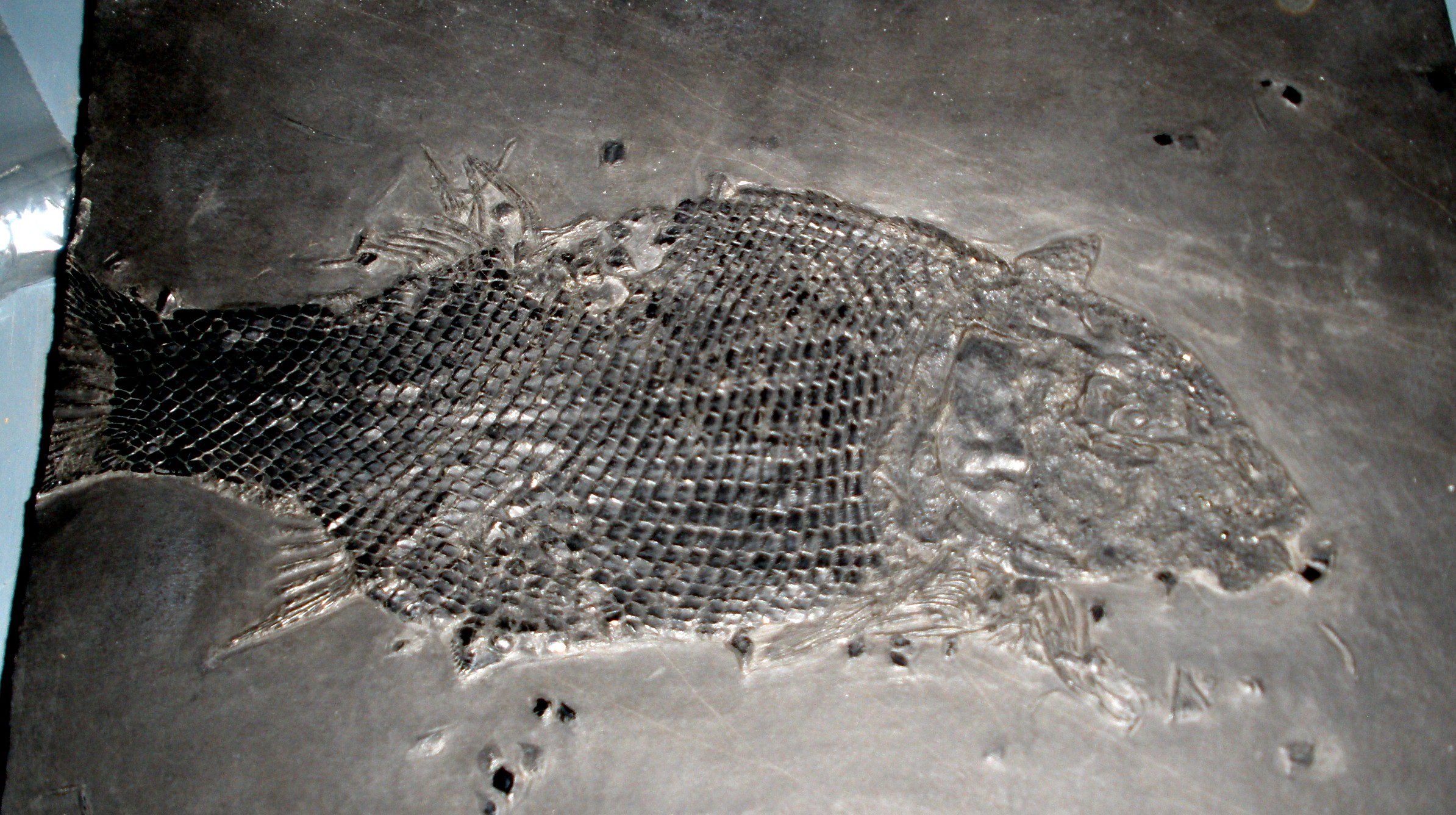
- Paralepidotus ornatus

Scientific classification
- Domain: Eukaryota
- Kingdom: Animalia
- Phylum: Chordata
- Class: Actinopterygii
- Clade: Ginglymodi
- Order: †Semionotiformes
- Family: †Callipurbeckiidae
- Genus: †Paralepidotus; Stolley, 1919

= Paralepidotus =

Paralepidotus Temporal range: 247.2–201.6 Ma Triassic

Extinct genus of fishes

Paralepidotus is an extinct genus of prehistoric ray-finned fish.

== Distribution ==
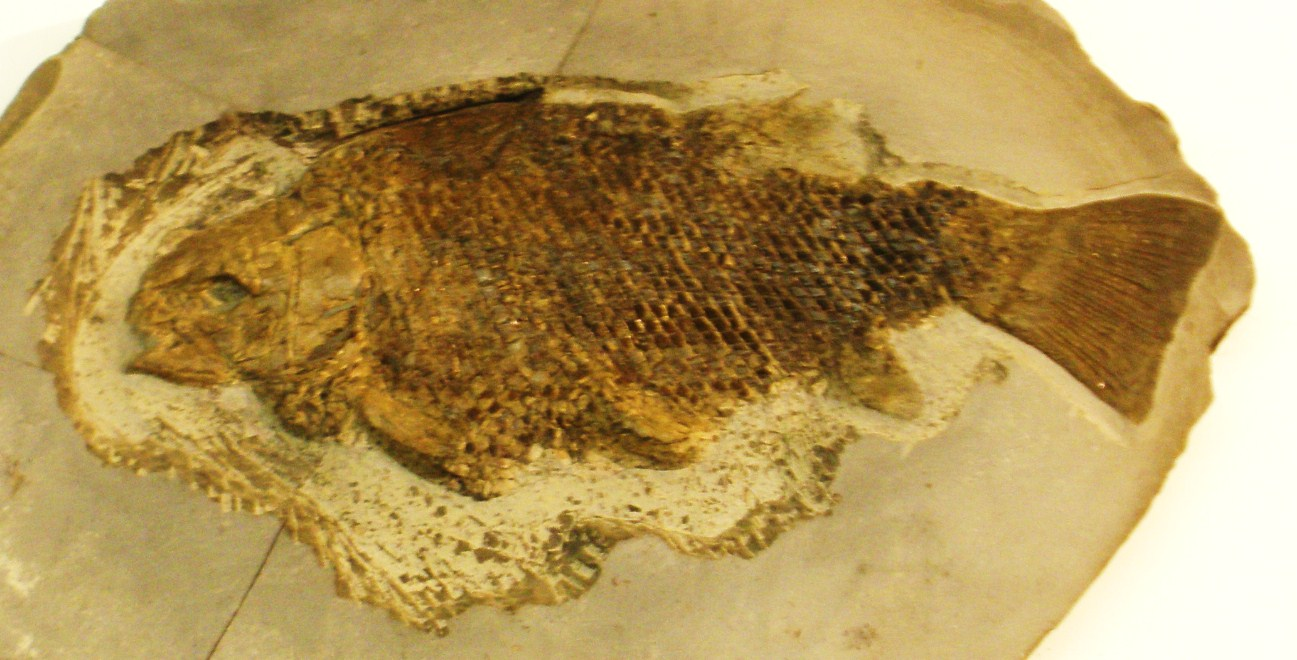
Fossil P. ornatus

Fossils of Paralepidotus are found in the Triassic marine strata of Austria, France, Italy, Poland, Saudi Arabia and United States.

== See also ==
- Prehistoric fish
- List of prehistoric bony fish
