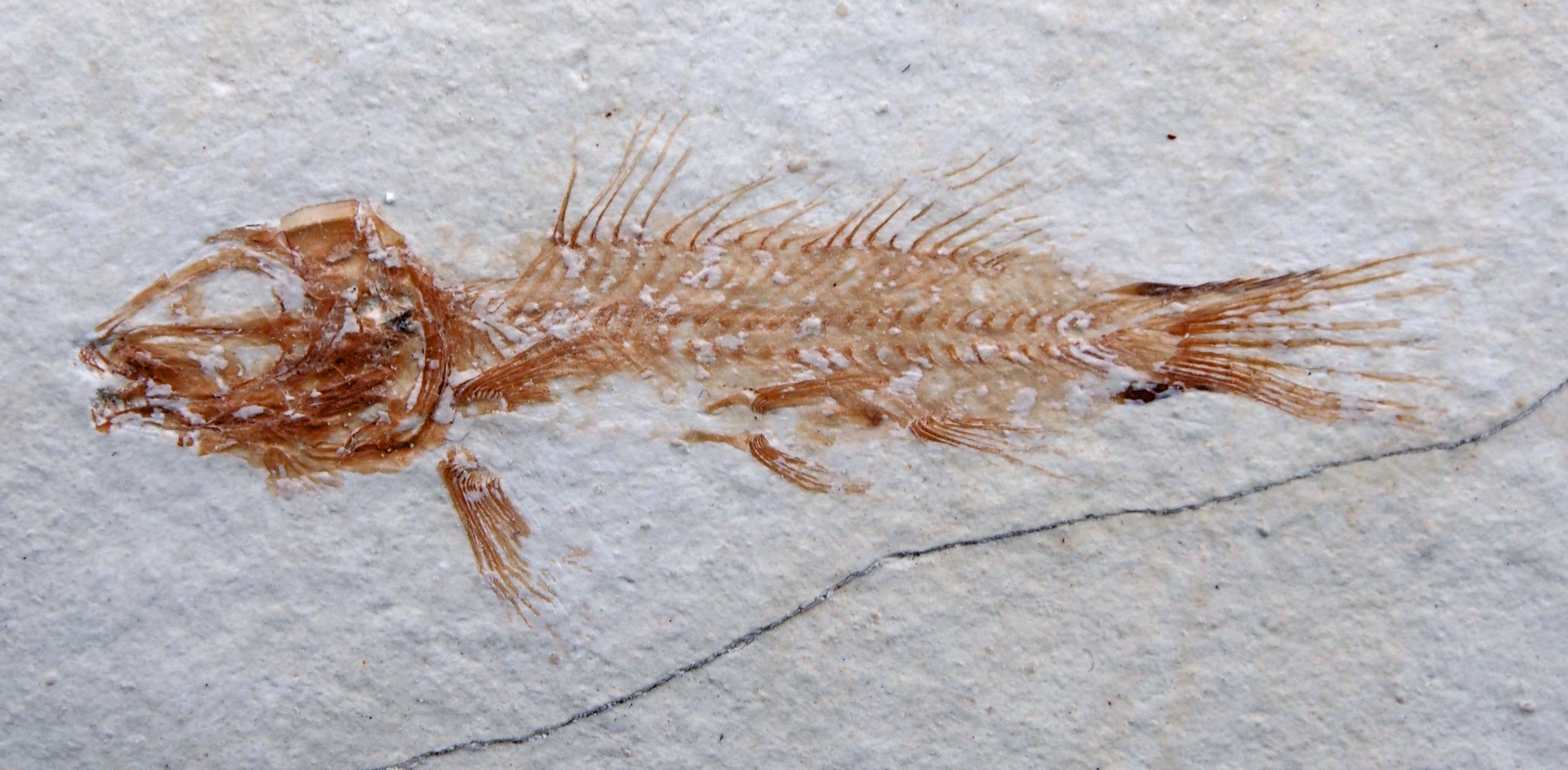
- Notagogus denticulatus from the Jurassic (Tithonian) of Painten, Germany

Scientific classification
- Kingdom: Animalia
- Phylum: Chordata
- Class: Actinopterygii
- Clade: Ginglymodi
- Order: †Semionotiformes
- Family: †Macrosemiidae
- Genus: †Notagogus; Agassiz, 1843

= Notagogus =

Extinct genus of fishes

Notagogus (from Greek: νῶτος nôtos, 'back' and Greek: ᾰ̓γωγός agōgós, 'leader') is an extinct genus of prehistoric bony fish. They can be found in the Solnhofen Plattenkalk.

== See also ==
- Prehistoric fish
- List of prehistoric bony fish
