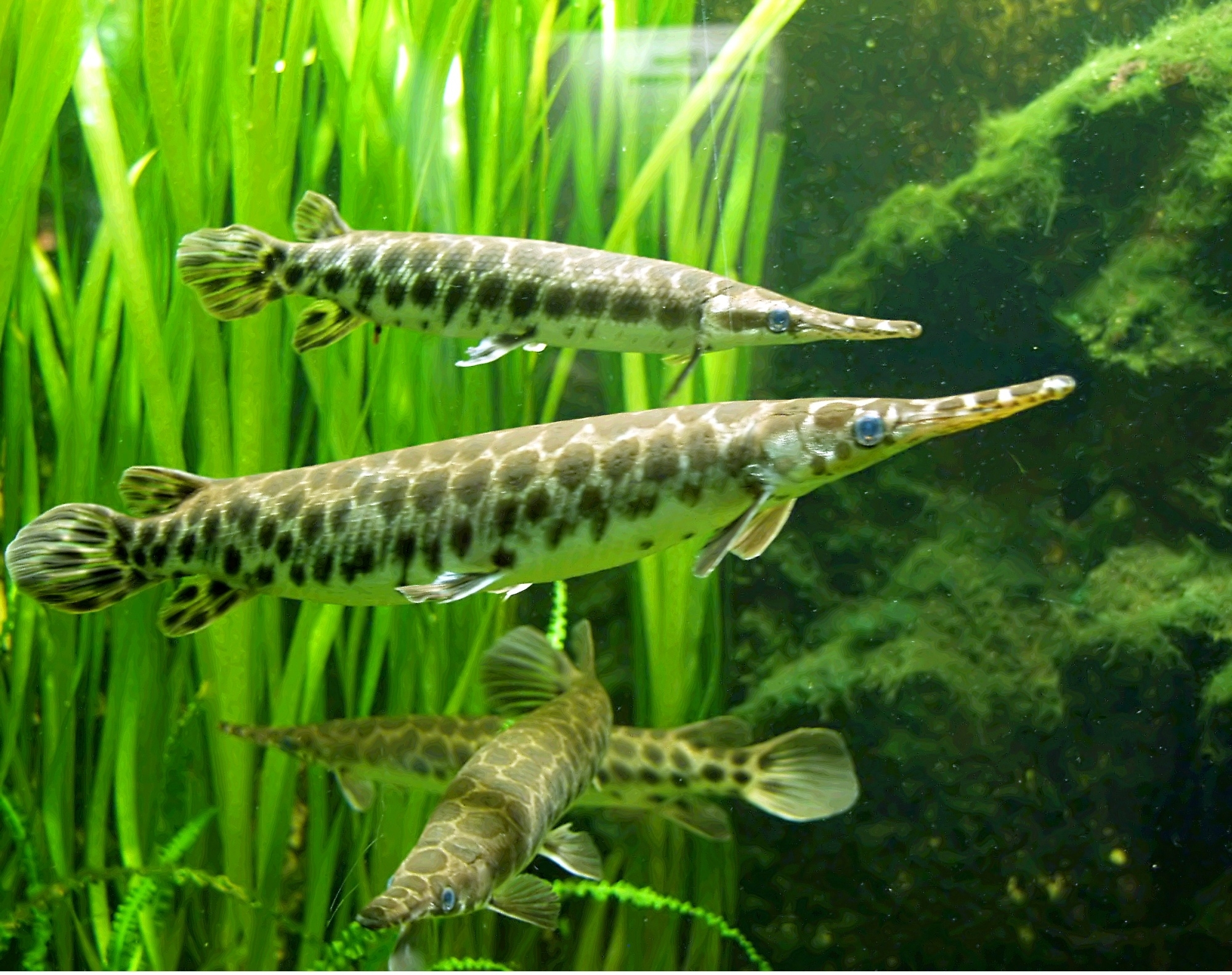
- Florida gar (Lepisosteus platyrhynchus) (Lepisosteidae)
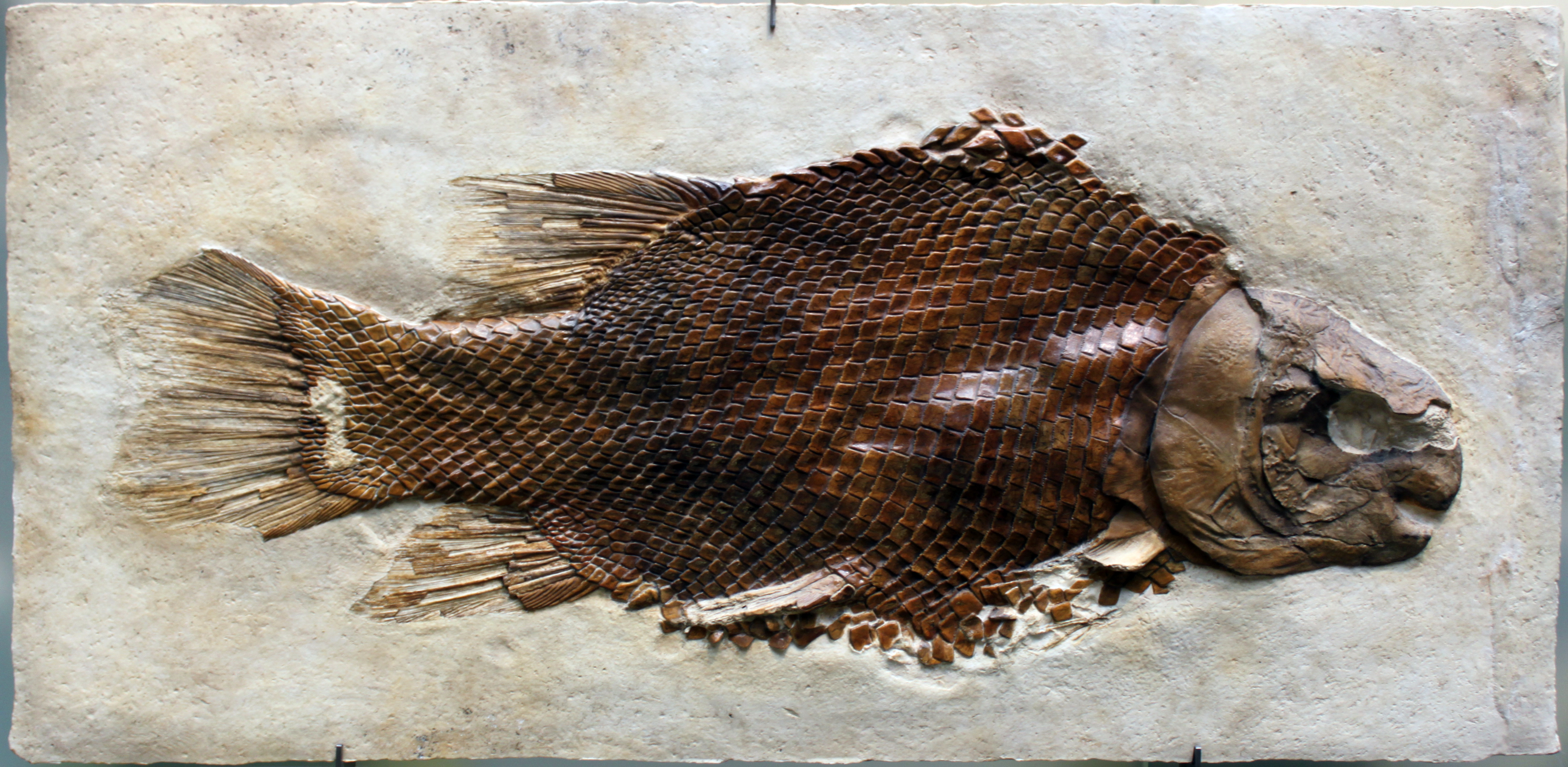
- Fossil of Scheenstia maximus (Lepidotidae)

Scientific classification
- Kingdom: Animalia
- Phylum: Chordata
- Class: Actinopterygii
- Clade: Ginglymodi
- Order: Lepisosteiformes; Hay, 1929

Families
- †Lepidotidae; Lepisosteioidei; †Obaichthyidae; Lepisosteidae; For other genera, see text

= Lepisosteiformes =

Lepisosteiformes Temporal range: Early Jurassic (Toarcian) to present

Order of fishes

Lepisosteiformes is an order of ray-finned fish and the only living members of the clade Ginglymodi. Its only extant representatives are the gar (family Lepisosteidae), and it is defined as all members of Ginglymodi that are more closely related to gar than to the extinct Semionotiformes, the other major grouping of ginglymodians. They are one of two extant orders in the infraclass Holostei alongside the Amiiformes (now represented by only the bowfins).

While represented only by the two extant genera of gar from North America, the Lepisosteiformes are an ancient group known as far back as the Early Jurassic, and formerly had a much larger range, being known from almost every continent. Considerable morphological diversity is known among extinct members compared to modern gar, from the superficially gar-like Obaichthyidae to the semionotiform-like Lepidotidae, which were previously classified in the Semionotiformes.

== Evolution ==
The earliest known lepisosteiform is the marine Lepidotes from the Early Jurassic of Germany, which largely shares the original body plan of Ginglymodi shared with Semionotiformes. However, phylogenetic estimates suggest that the earliest lepisosteiforms diverged from their closest relatives in the Middle Triassic. The most basal lepisosteiform is thought to be Khoratichthys from the Late Jurassic or Early Cretaceous of Thailand, which is thought to have diverged from other members of the group during the Late Triassic. Other studies suggest that the most basal member is Neosemionotus from the Early Cretaceous of Argentina, which diverged from the rest of the group during the Early Jurassic.

Numerous early lepisosteiforms (including basal lepisosteiforms such as Khoratichthys and Lanxangichthys, lepidotids such as Isanichthys, and basal lepisosteoids such as Thaiichthys) are known from the Late Jurassic and Early Cretaceous of Thailand and Laos, suggesting that what is now Southeast Asia may have been an important region for early lepisosteiform evolution, and that ginglymodians were the dominant fish in freshwater ecosystems in the region at the time.

It has been suggested that as is with basal ginglymodians and the Semionotiformes, the earliest lepisosteiforms were marine and independently colonized and diversified in freshwater ecosystems multiple times; first among the Lepidotidae, and then among the Lepisosteoidei. Two independent freshwater colonizations appear to have occurred among the lepisosteioids: one in Southeast Asia and one in West Gondwana. The latter included the Obaichthyidae, close relatives of the gar.

The ecology of the group including extinct members broader than that of living gars. Members of Lepidotidae in particular are strongly different from modern gars in having bulky bodies, with the large (up to 2 metres (6.6 ft)) lepidotid Scheenstia developing powerful jaws filled with rounded teeth that were likely used to crush shells (durophagy).

== Classification ==
- Order Lepisosteiformes Hay, 1929
  - Genus †Adrianaichthys
  - Genus †Beiduyu
  - Genus †Khoratichthys
  - Genus †Lanxangichthys
  - Genus †Neosemionotus
  - Family †Lepidotidae
  - Suborder Lepisosteoidei López-Arbarello, 2012
    - Genus †Araripelepidotes
    - Genus †Pliodetes
    - Genus †Thaiichthys
    - Superfamily Lepisosteoidea López-Arbarello, 2012
      - Family †Obaichthyidae
      - Family Lepisosteidae
