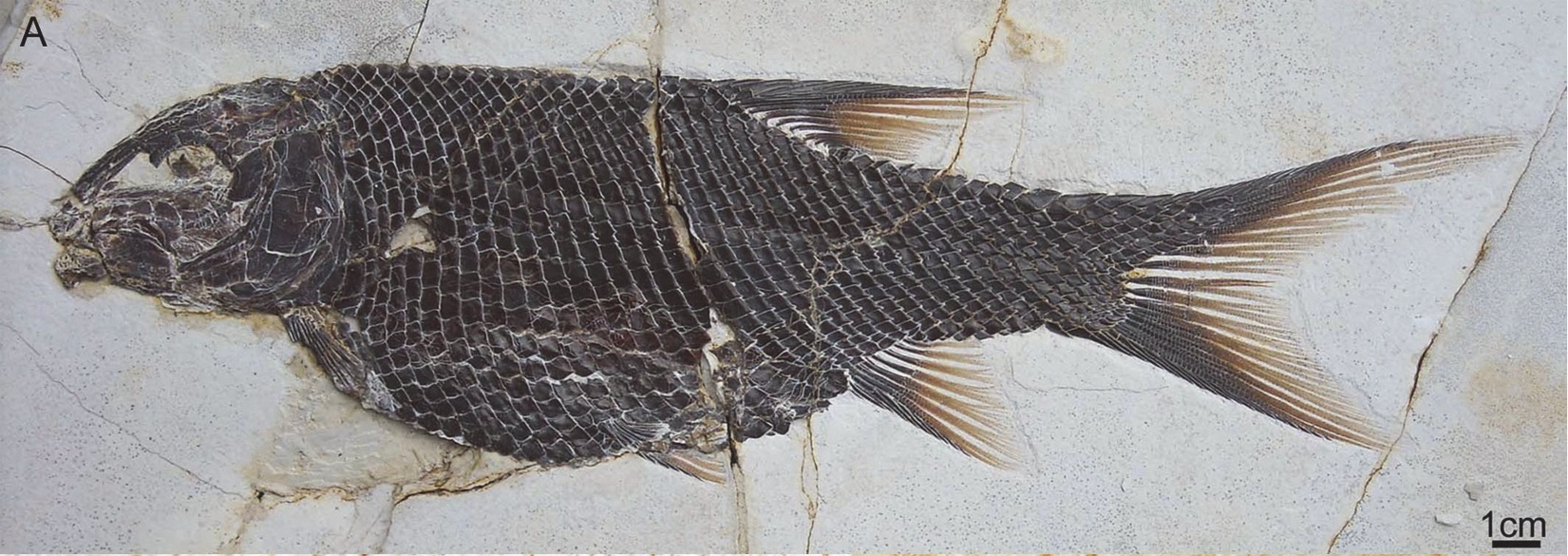
- Fossil

Scientific classification
- Domain: Eukaryota
- Kingdom: Animalia
- Phylum: Chordata
- Class: Actinopterygii
- Clade: Ginglymodi
- Order: †Semionotiformes
- Genus: †Macrosemimimus; Schröder et al., 2012

Species
- †Macrosemimimus fegerti Schröder et al., 2012 (type); †M. lennieri (Sauvage, 1893 [originally Lepidotes lennieri])

Synonyms
- Lepidotes toombsi Jain & Robinson, 1963

= Macrosemimimus =

Macrosemimimus Temporal range: Late Jurassic

Extinct genus of fishes

Macrosemimimus is an extinct genus of semionotiform ray-finned fish from the Late Jurassic of Germany, England and France.
