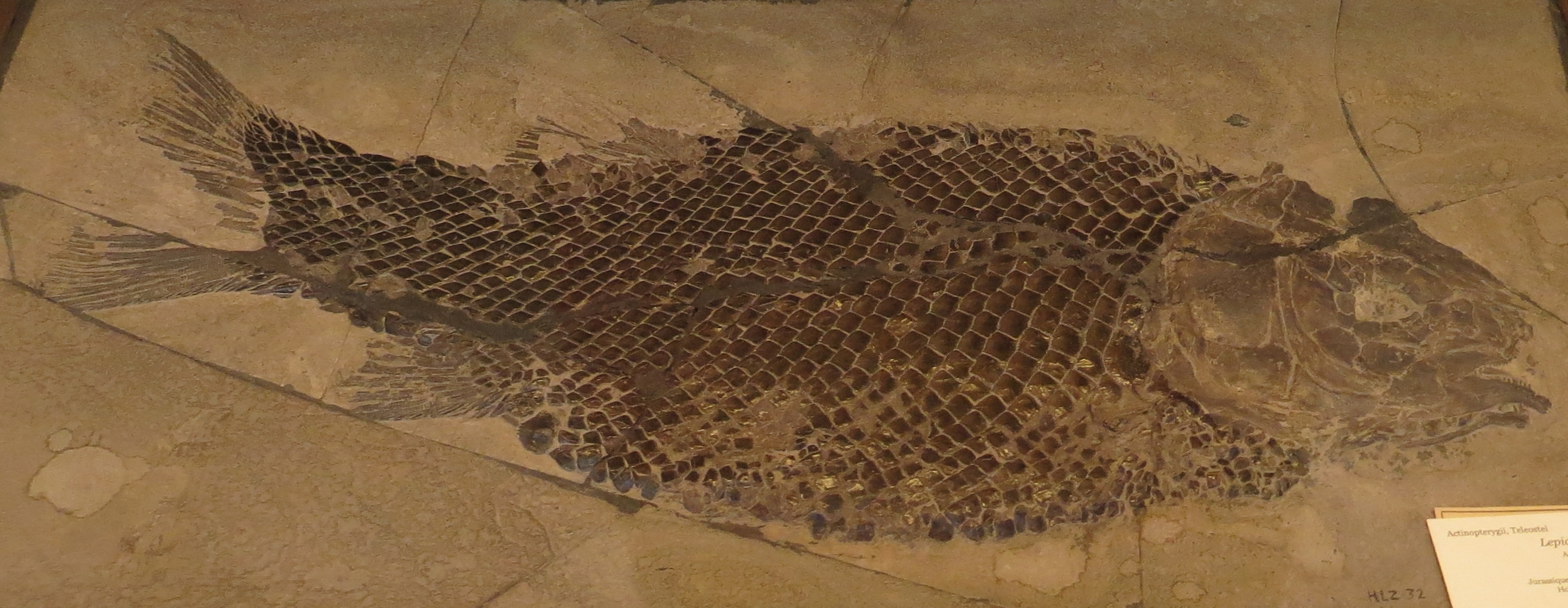
- Fossil specimen of L. gigas

Scientific classification
- Kingdom: Animalia
- Phylum: Chordata
- Class: Actinopterygii
- Clade: Ginglymodi
- Order: Lepisosteiformes
- Family: †Lepidotidae
- Genus: †Lepidotes; Agassiz, 1832

Type species
- †Lepidotes gigas Agassiz, 1832

Species
- †L. elvensis (Blainville, 1818) (orig. Cyprinus); †L. gigas (type) Agassiz, 1832; †L. semiserratus Agassiz, 1836

Synonyms
- Genus synonymy: Lepidosaurus Meyer, 1833; Serobodus Münster, 1812; Sphaerodus Agassiz, 1833; Plesiodus Wagner, 1863; Prolepidotus Zeitschr, 1983; Species synonymy: L. elvensis; Cyprinus elvensis de Blainville, 1818; Lepidotes gigas Agassiz, 1832; Lepidotus gigas (Agassiz, 1832) Agassiz, 1833; Lepidotus elcensis Quenstedt, 1847 (lapsus calami); L. semiserratus; Lepidotus latissimus Agassiz, 1833; Lepidotus umbonatus Agassiz, 1833; L. gallineki; Prolepidotus gallineki (Michael, 1863) Michael, 1893; L. tuberculatus; Lepidotus unguiculatus Agassiz, 1837; Shaerodus minor Agassiz, 1844; Pycnodus rudis Phillips, 1871

= Lepidotes =

Lepidotes Temporal range: Early Jurassic (Toarcian)

Genus of fishes (fossil)

Lepidotes (from Greek: λεπιδωτός lepidōtós, 'covered with scales') (previously known as Lepidotus) is an extinct genus of marine ray-finned fish known from the Early Jurassic (Toarcian) of Europe. It belongs to Ginglymodi, a clade of fish whose only living representatives are the gars (Lepisosteidae). The type species L. gigas and close relatives are thought to be members of the family Lepidotidae, part of the order Lepisosteiformes within Ginglymodi, with other species occupying various other positions within Ginglymodi. It was one of the earliest known close relatives of modern gars and is classified in the same order as them, although morphologically it still superficially resembled the earlier-diverging semionotiform fishes.

== Taxonomy ==
Lepidotes has long been considered a wastebasket taxon, characterised by "general features, such as thick rhomboid scales and, for most of the species, by semi-tritorial or strongly tritoral (broad, flat teeth adapted for crushing) dentition" with dozens of species previously assigned to it. Fossils attributed to Lepidotes were originally found in Jurassic and Cretaceous rocks worldwide. However, more recently it has been argued that Lepidotes should be restricted to species closely related to the type species L. gigas, which are only known from the Early Jurassic of Western and Central Europe, with most other species being not closely related, with other species transferred to new genera such as Scheenstia.

The closest relative of Lepidotes sensu stricto was Mengius, a similar fish from the Toarcian of Germany.

=== Species ===
The following valid species are known:

==== L. gigas ====
The type species of the genus, it is known from the Early Jurassic (Toarcian) of Germany, where it is known from the Posidonia Shale lagerstätte. Based on some specimens, it could measure up to 75 centimetres (2.46 ft) long. In the past, it has been confused with L. elvensis from France, which was described earlier but not under the genus Lepidotes, and has thus previously been treated as a junior synonym. However, more recently the two species have been found to differ in skull shape and morphology, and are thus now understood as distinct species.

==== L. elvensis ====
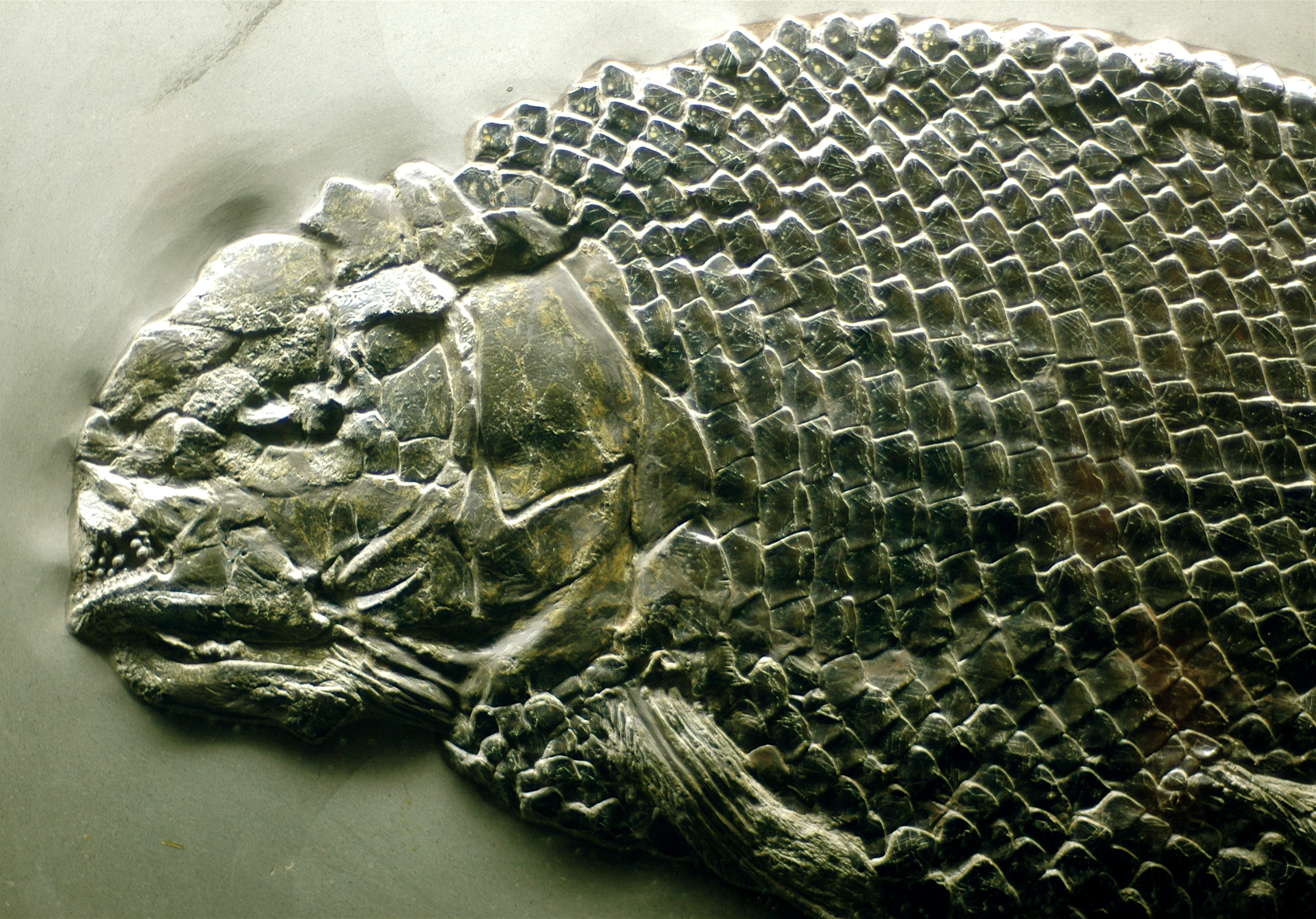
Fossil of L. elvensis

L. elvensis was described by Ducrotay de Blainville in 1818, originally as a species of Cyprinus. The type specimen is known from an undifferentiated Toarcian-aged deposit in La Caine, France, and is housed in the Paris Museum of Natural History. The external bones of this species are smooth, but some have sparsely placed coarse tuberculations (protuberances). The frontal bone is more than twice the length of the parietal in the specimens. It also has a comparatively narrow marginal symphysis (articulation).

==== L. semiserratus ====
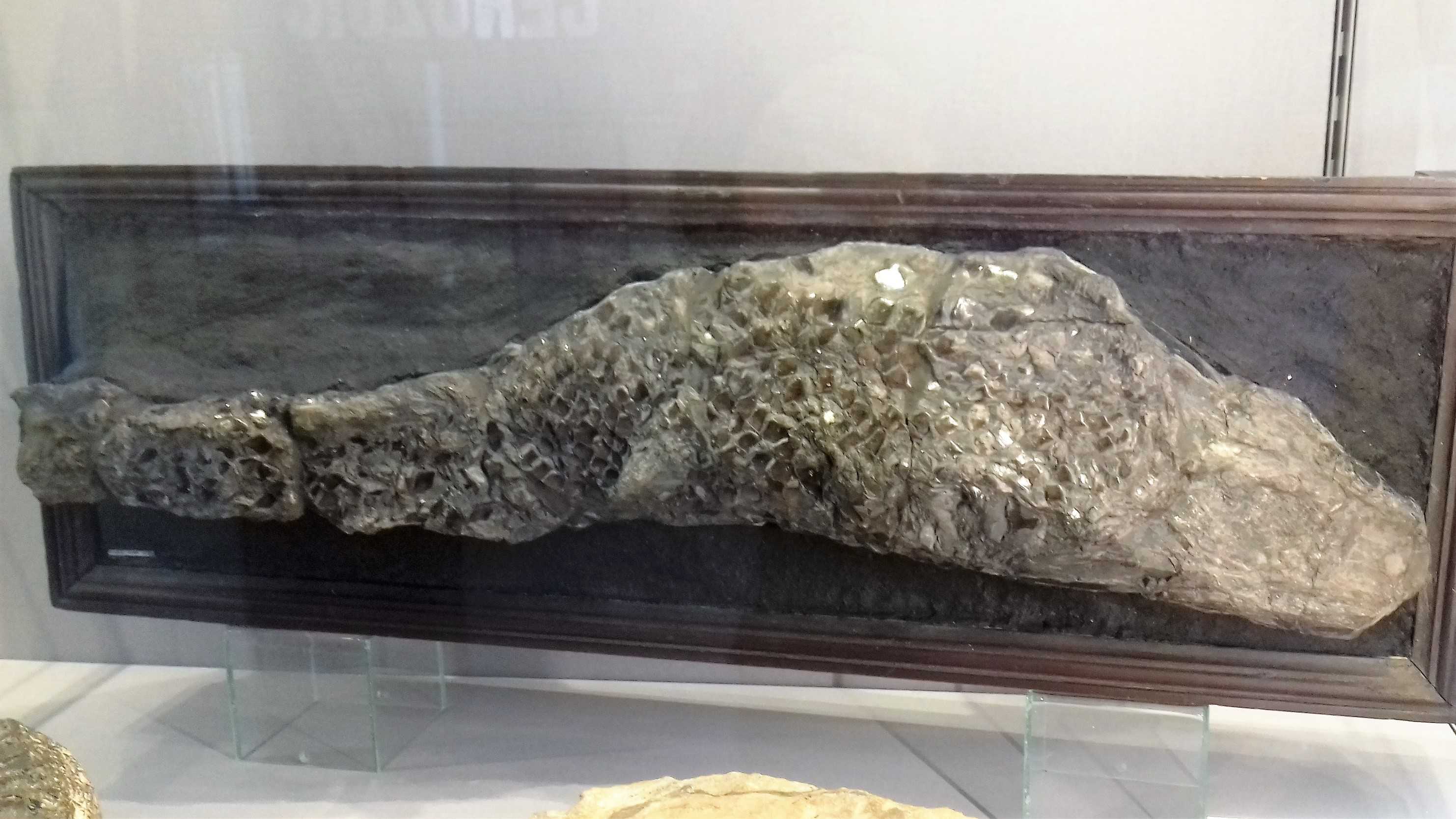
Fossil specimen of L. semiserratus

This species was named by Agassiz in 1837 and is known from some incomplete remains. It has been classified as closely related to L. elvensis. It is more elongate than L. elvensis, being four times as long as tall. It also has more sharply angulated sutures between its parietals, and the parietals are also proportionally longer. It is known from the Upper Lias of Yorkshire, England, where they are known from the Toarcian-aged Whitby Mudstone Formation.

Another species definitively assignable to Lepidotes, "L." buelowianus from the Toarcian-aged Grimmen Formation of Germany, has been identified more recently as a nomen dubium, due to the type specimen being lost and the original description being improperly done.

=== Reassigned species ===
Various fish from the Late Jurassic to mid-Cretaceous previously assigned into Lepidotes have now been moved into their own genera, including Scheenstia, Callipurbeckia, Isanichthys, Thaiichthys, Quasimodichthys, Hoyasotes, Lepidhoyas and Adrianaichthys. Some of these such as Callipurbeckia are placed in the earlier-diverging order Semionotiformes, while others are retained in the Lepisosteiformes.

The following species have not yet been reclassified into a different genus, but are not considered true members of Lepidotes:

- "L." alagoensis Gallo, 2000 - Early Cretaceous of Brazil (Sergipe-Alagoas Basin)
- "L." gloriae Thies, 1989 - Late Jurassic (Oxfordian) of Cuba (Jagua Formation)
- "L." deccanensis Sykes, 1854 - Early Jurassic of India (Kota Formation)
- "L." dixseptiensis Gallo & Brito, 2004 - Early Cretaceous of Brazil (Açu Formation)
- "L." mawsoni Woodward, 1888 - Early Cretaceous of Brazil
- "L." roxoi Santos, 1953 - Early Cretaceous of Brazil
- "L." souzai Woodward, 1908 - Early Cretaceous of Brazil
- "L." wenzae Brito & Gallo, 2003 - Early Cretaceous (Albian) of Brazil (Romualdo Formation)

== Description ==
Inhabiting shallow seas, Lepidotes was typically about 30 centimetres (12 in) long. The body was covered with thick, enamelled scales.

Lepidotes was one of the earliest fish in which the upper jawbones were no longer attached to the jugal bone. This allowed the jaws to be stretched into a 'tube' so that the fish could suck in prey from a greater distance than in previous species. This system is still seen in some modern fish, such as carp.

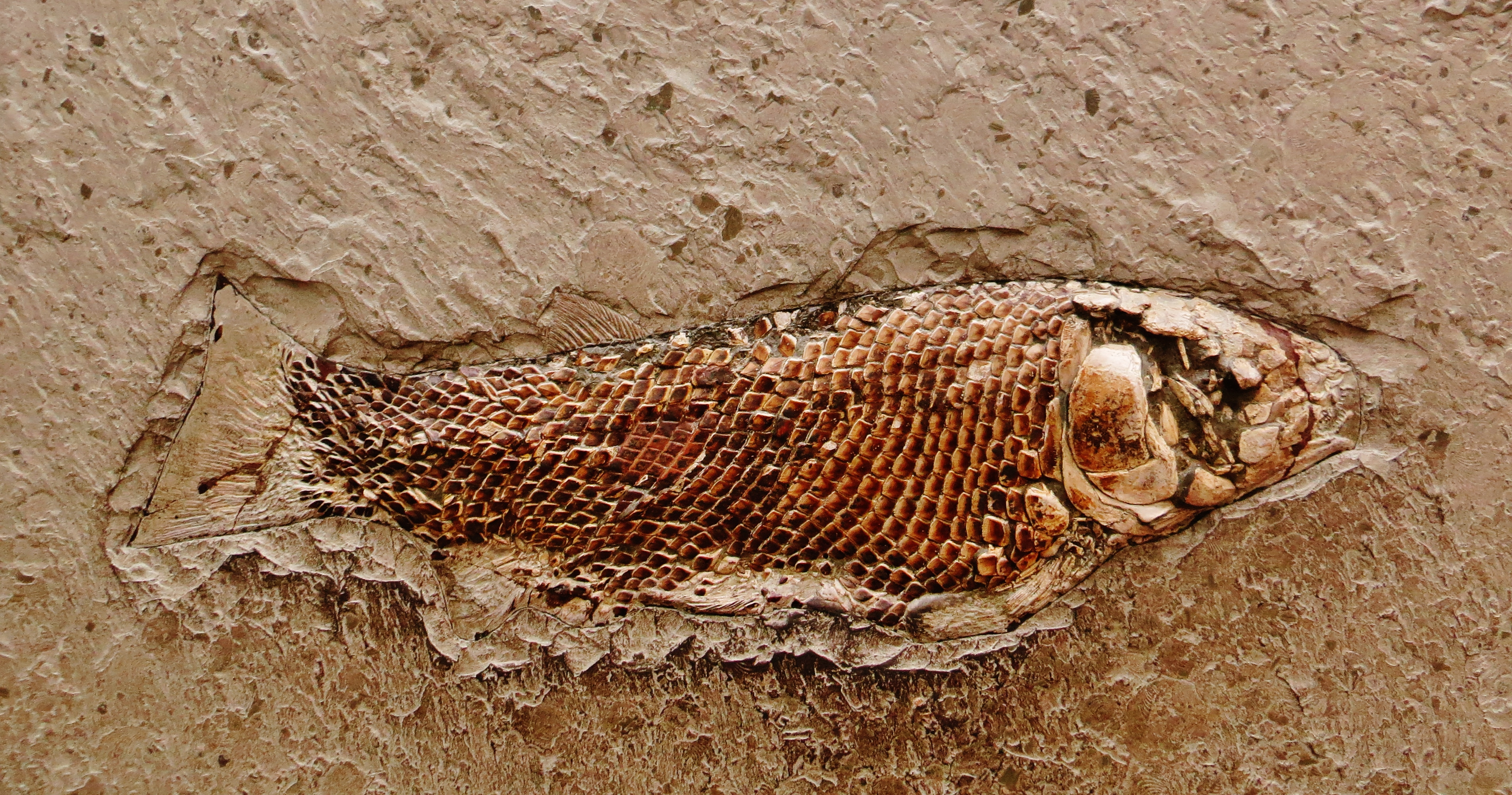
Specimen of L. elvensis

Also on the jaws of Lepidotes were prominent foramina on the maxilla, suggesting significant innervation within the jaws. This suggests a thickened upper lip or potentially barbels, which may have supported sensory organs.

Lepidotes scales are ovular in shape, and are 18.5 millimetres (0.73 in) long and 3 millimetres (0.12 in) thick at the thickest point. The scales are smooth and shiny on the external surface, with only a few small depressions scattered toward the centre that are shaped like punctures.

Stomach contents of Lepidotes from the Early Jurassic of Germany have found remains of crustacean cuticles, and it is suggested that they fed on relatively soft-bodied prey, which was grasped with the slender marginal teeth, before being crushed by the rounded palatal teeth.

=== Distinguishing characteristics ===
Many characteristics were identified by Woodward in 1895, and they are listed below:

- a fusiform trunk only moderately compressed;
- the fact that the marginal teeth are compressed;
- the presence of stouter inner teeth that are smooth;
- ossified ribs;
- very large fin-fulera on all fins;
- that all paired fins are small;
- short and deep dorsal and anal fins;
- very robust, smooth or feebly oriented scales;
- flank scales that are not much deeper than wide;
- scales ventrally nearly as deep as broad;
- and the presence of inconspicuous dorsal and ventral ridge-scales.
