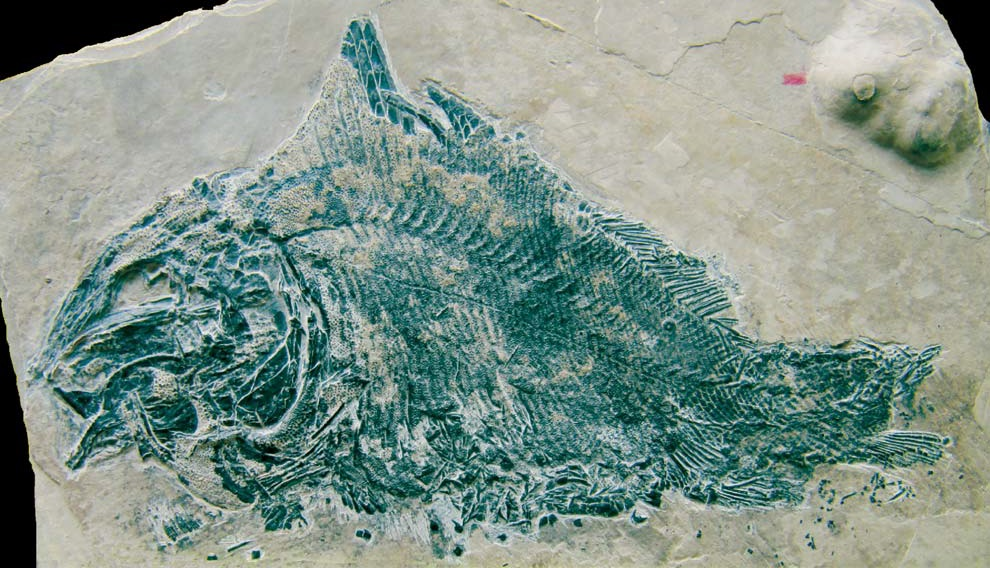
- holotype

Scientific classification
- Kingdom: Animalia
- Phylum: Chordata
- Class: Actinopterygii
- Clade: Halecomorphi
- Genus: †Luoxiongichthys; Wen et al., 2011

Species
- †L. hyperdorsalis Wen et al., 2011 (type)

= Luoxiongichthys =

Luoxiongichthys Temporal range: Anisian

Extinct genus of ray-finned fishes

Luoxiongichthys is an extinct genus of basal actinopterygian (ray-finned fish) known from the lower Middle Triassic (Pelsonian substage, Anisian stage) of Luoxiong Town, Luoping County of Yunnan Province, southwestern China.

It is known from the holotype LPV-10144, which consists of nearly complete skeleton and skull, from the paratype LPV-10120, a partial skull and from the referred materials LPV-10625, LPV-6868 and LPV-11817. Fossils were found in the new Middle Triassic Lagerstätte of the Guanling Formation, Member II.

== Etymology ==
It was first named by Wen Wen, Qi-Yue Zhang, Chang-Yong Zhou, Jin-Yuan Huang, Zhong Qiang Chen and Michael J. Benton in 2011 and the type species is Luoxiongichthys hyperdorsalis. The generic name is derived from Luoxiong Town, where the specimens were found and ichthys, "fish" from Greek. The specific name comes from hyper, "over" and dorsalis, "of the back" from Greek in reference to its elevated "hump" in front of the dorsal fin.

== Phylogeny ==
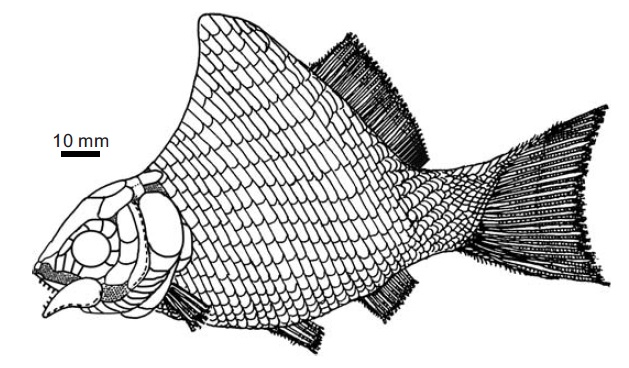
Restoration

Cladogram after Wen et al., 2011:

- Halecomorphi
  - Luoxiongichthys
  - - Watsonulus
    - - Macrepistius
      - Amiiformes
        - Caturus
        - Amia
