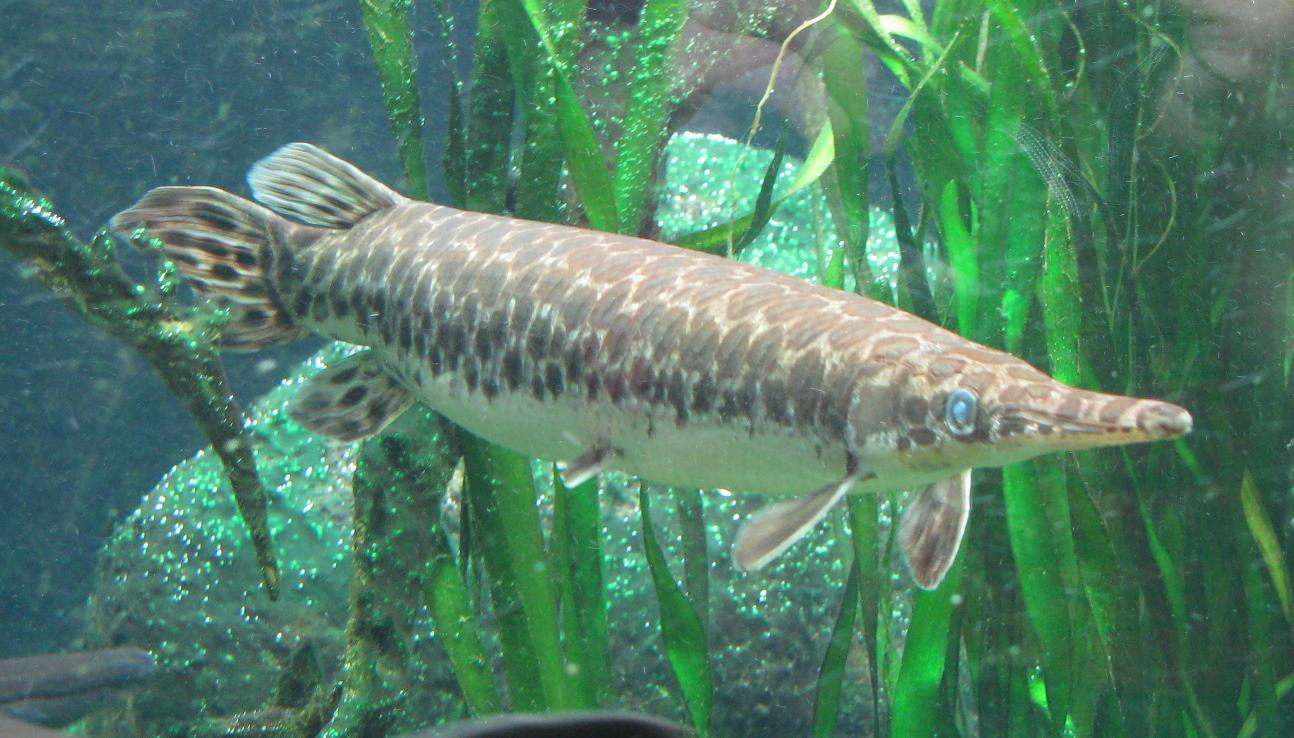
- Spotted gar (Lepisosteus oculatus)
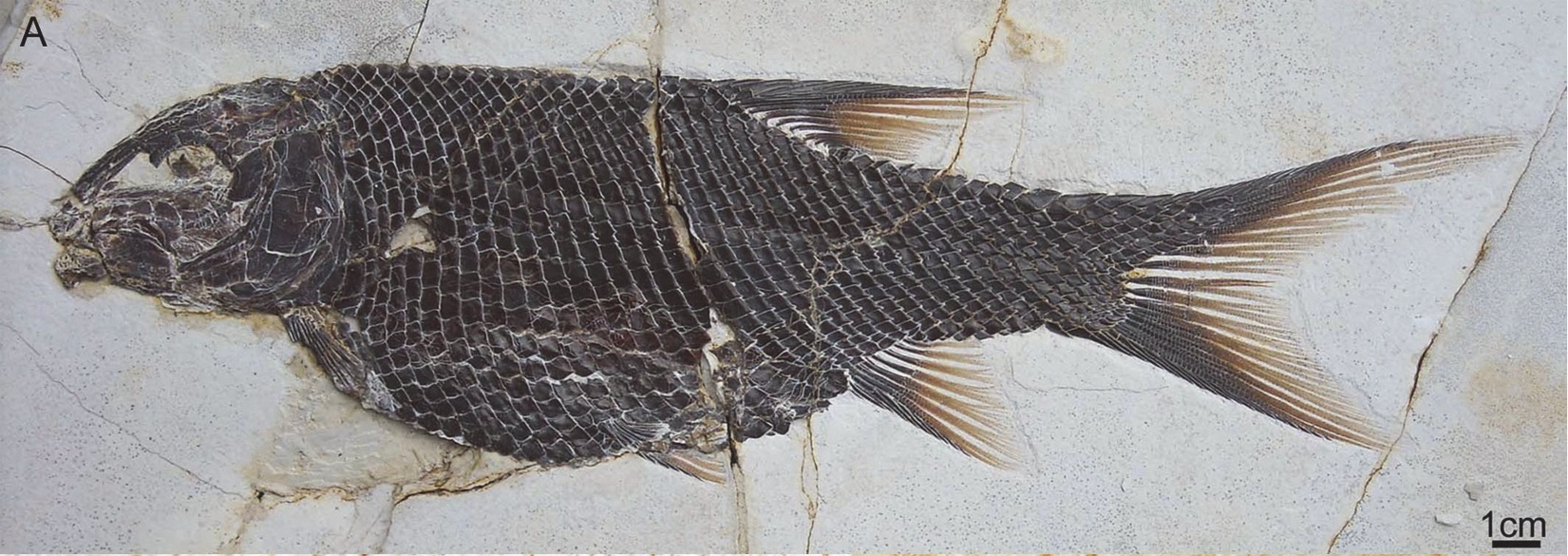
- Macrosemimimus fegerti (Semionotiformes) from the Upper Jurassic of Germany

Scientific classification
- Kingdom: Animalia
- Phylum: Chordata
- Class: Actinopterygii
- Infraclass: Holostei
- Clade: Ginglymodi; Cope, 1871

Subgroups
- †Diandongichthys; †Sangiorgioichthys; †Ticinolepis; †Kyphosichthyiformes; Neoginglymodi López-Arbarello & Sferco, 2018; †Semionotiformes; Lepisosteiformes

= Ginglymodi =

Ginglymodi Temporal range: Middle Triassic (Anisian)–present Possible Permian records

Clade of ray-finned fishes

Ginglymodi is a clade of ray-finned fish containing modern-day gars (Lepisosteidae) and their extinct relatives (including the family Lepidotidae) in the order Lepisosteiformes, the extinct orders Semionotiformes and Kyphosichthyiformes, and various other extinct taxa. Ginglymodi is one of the two major subgroups of the infraclass Holostei, the other one being Halecomorphi, which contains the bowfin and eyespot bowfin and their fossil relatives.

== Fossil record ==
The fossil record of ginglymodians goes back at least to the Anisian stage of the Triassic period, over 240 million years ago. Eosemionotus is one of the earliest ginglymodians. Acentrophorus, another taxon from the Middle and Late Permian, and Paracentrophorus from the Early Triassic epoch, could be even earlier members of the group. Ginglymodi was diverse and widespread during the Mesozoic era, but they represent a depauperate lineage today. The group first evolved in marine environments, but several lineages made separate transitions into freshwater environments. The basal ginglymodian order Kyphosichthyiformes is known from a few genera from the Triassic of China, many of which have deep bodies.

Ginglymodi underwent substantial diversification during the Late Triassic and the Late Jurassic, with the Lepisosteiformes and Semionotiformes having likely diverged during the Middle Triassic. Early non-gar ginglymodians of all groups, but especially early lepisosteiforms, show heavy morphological convergence with modern cypriniforms (carp and relatives), suggesting that they may have had a similar ecological niche. Notably, molecular evidence suggests that the cypriniforms may have originated and diversified around the same time and place (Late Jurassic and Early Cretaceous Southeast Asia) that the similar freshwater ginglymodians showed major diversification. Eventually, some ginglymodians evolved a more predatory lifestyle, with the earliest known true gars from the Late Jurassic. Ginglymodians underwent a major decline during the mid-Cretaceous, eventually leaving gars as the only surviving members of the group. Gar fossils have been found on all continents except Australia and Antarctica. Only seven species exist today, distributed in the freshwater systems of North America.

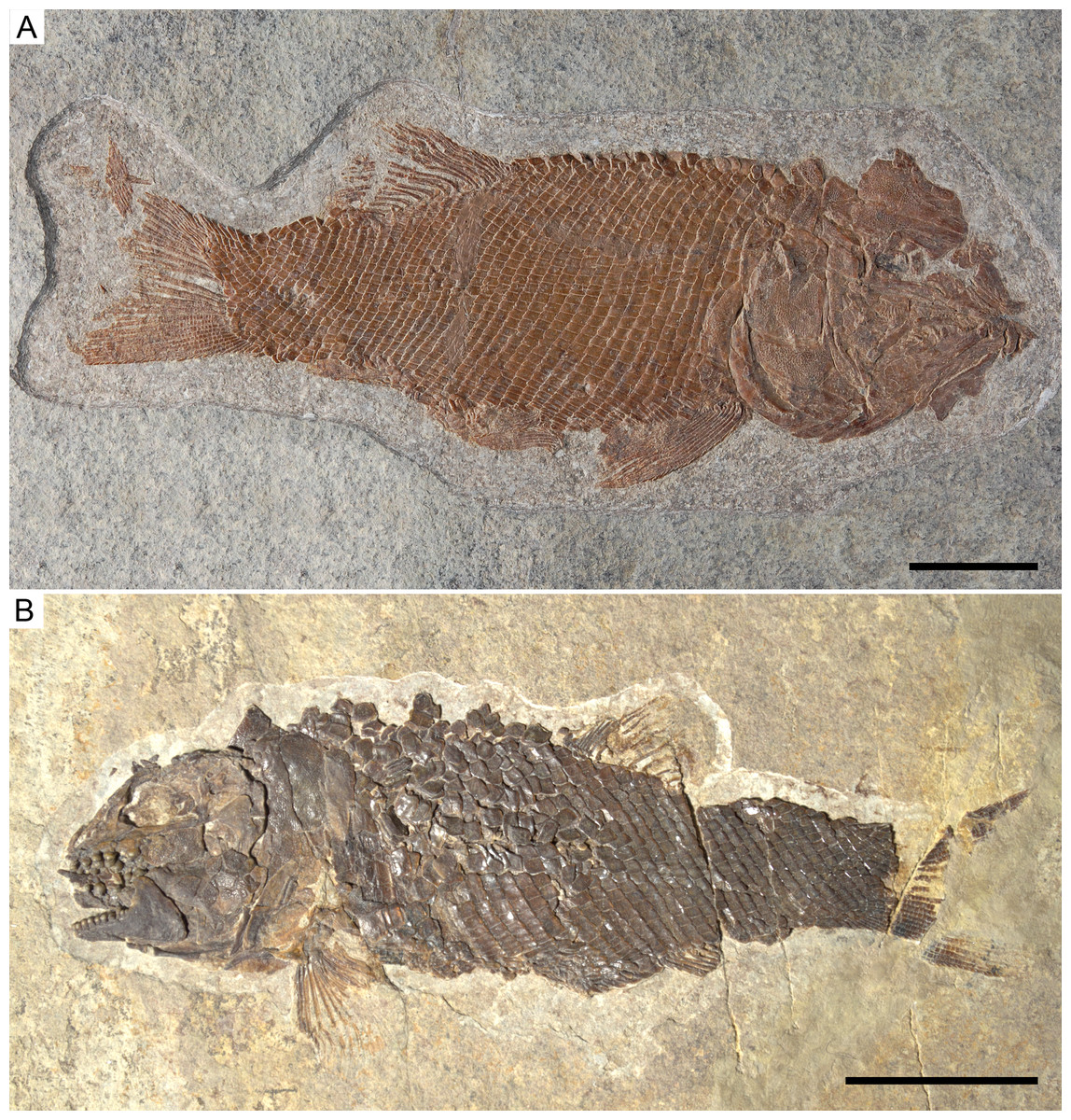
The Middle Triassic Ticinolepis

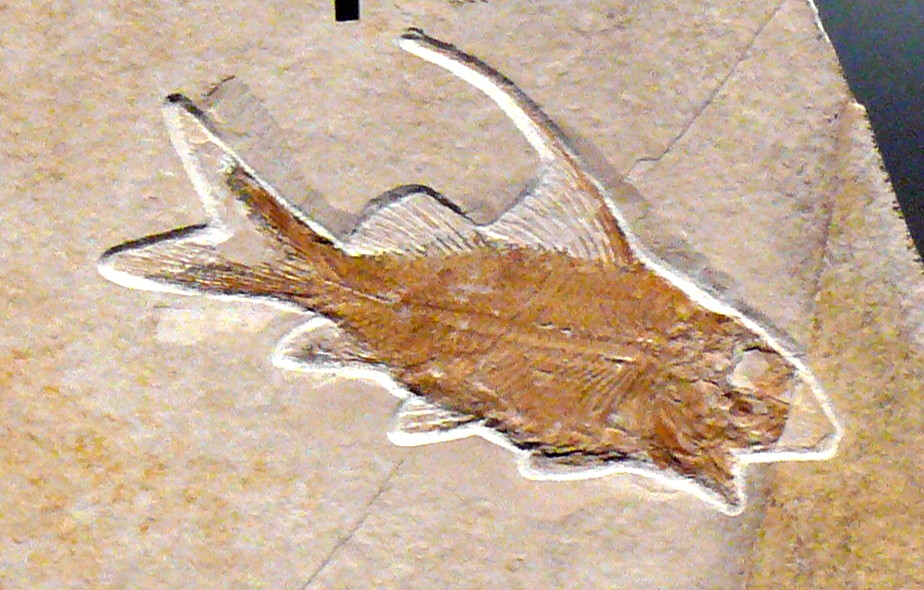
The Jurassic macrosemiid semionotiform Propterus sp.

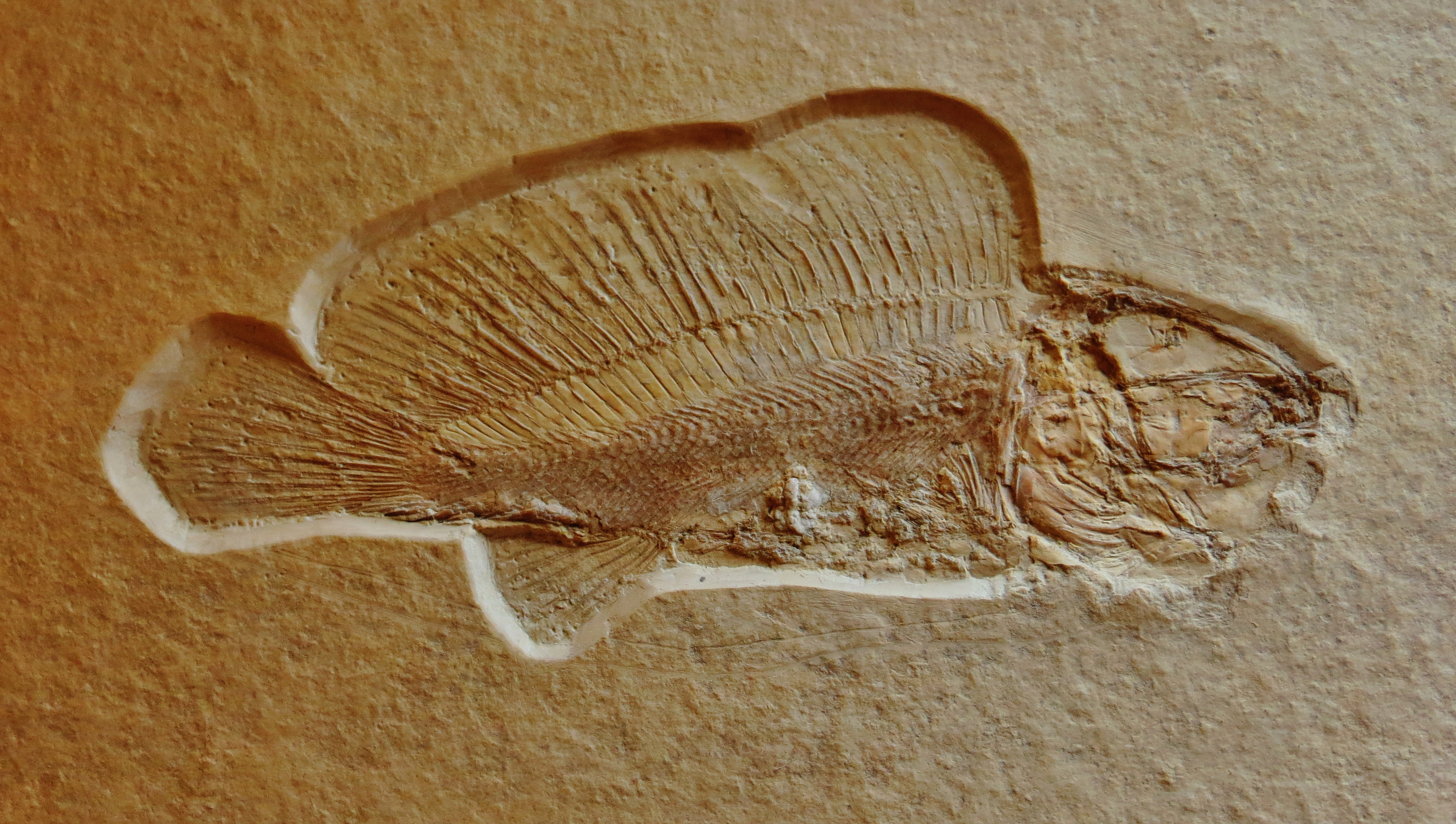
The Jurassic macrosemiid semionotiform Macrosemius rostratus

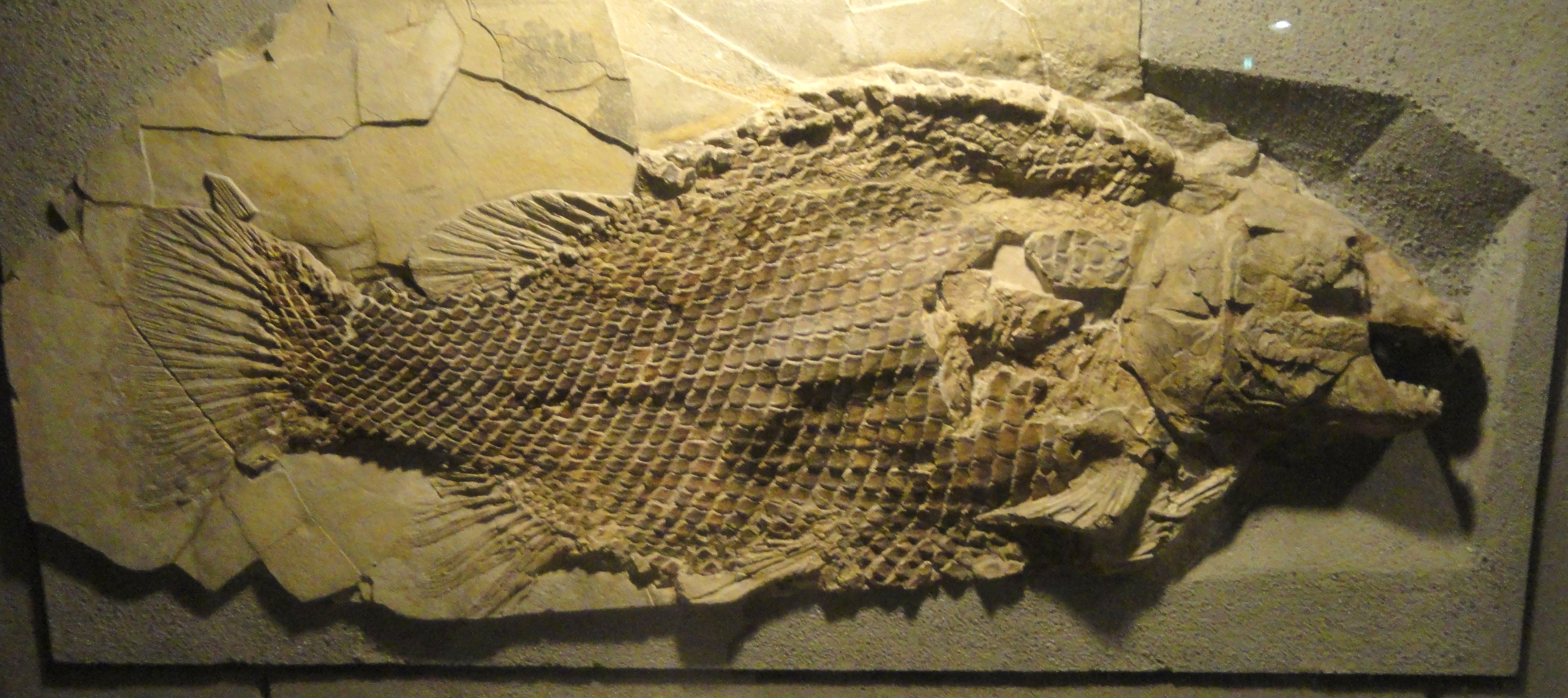
The Late Jurassic European lepidotid lepisosteiform Scheenstia maxima

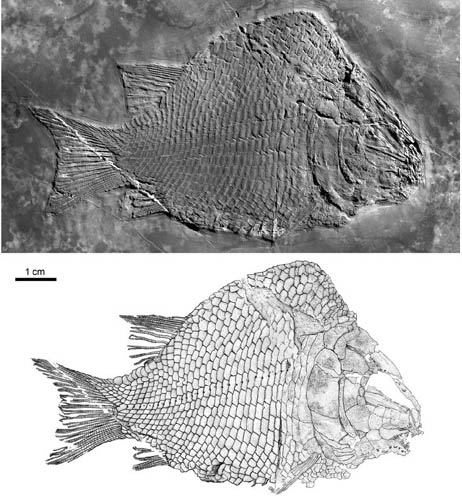
The basal ginglymodian Kyphosichthys (Kyphosichthyiformes) from the Middle Triassic of China

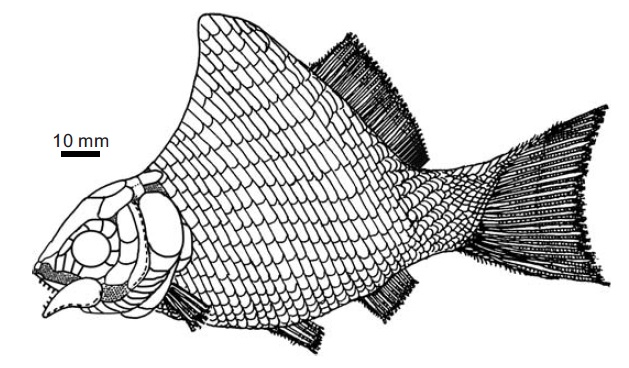
Luoxiongichthys, a basal ginglymodian from the Middle Triassic of China

== Phylogeny ==
Phylogenetic relationships of Ginglymodi to other living neopterygian fish.

- Neopterygii
  - Teleostei
  - Holostei
    - Halecomorphi (bowfin, eyespot bowfin and their fossil relatives)
    - Ginglymodi (gars and their fossil relatives)

Phylogenetic relationships among different groups of ginglymodians (cladogram after Xu & Ma 2023):

- Ginglymodi
  - †Diandongichthys
  - †Ticinolepis
  - - †Kyphosichthyiformes
      - - Fuyuanichthys
        - Kyphosichthys
      - - Yudaiichthys
        - Lashanichthys
    - - †Sangiorgioichthys
      - - †Semionotiformes
        - Lepisosteiformes
