= Cerin Lagerstätte =

Paleontological site in France

- Stratigraphic range: Late Kimmeridgian; ~153 Ma
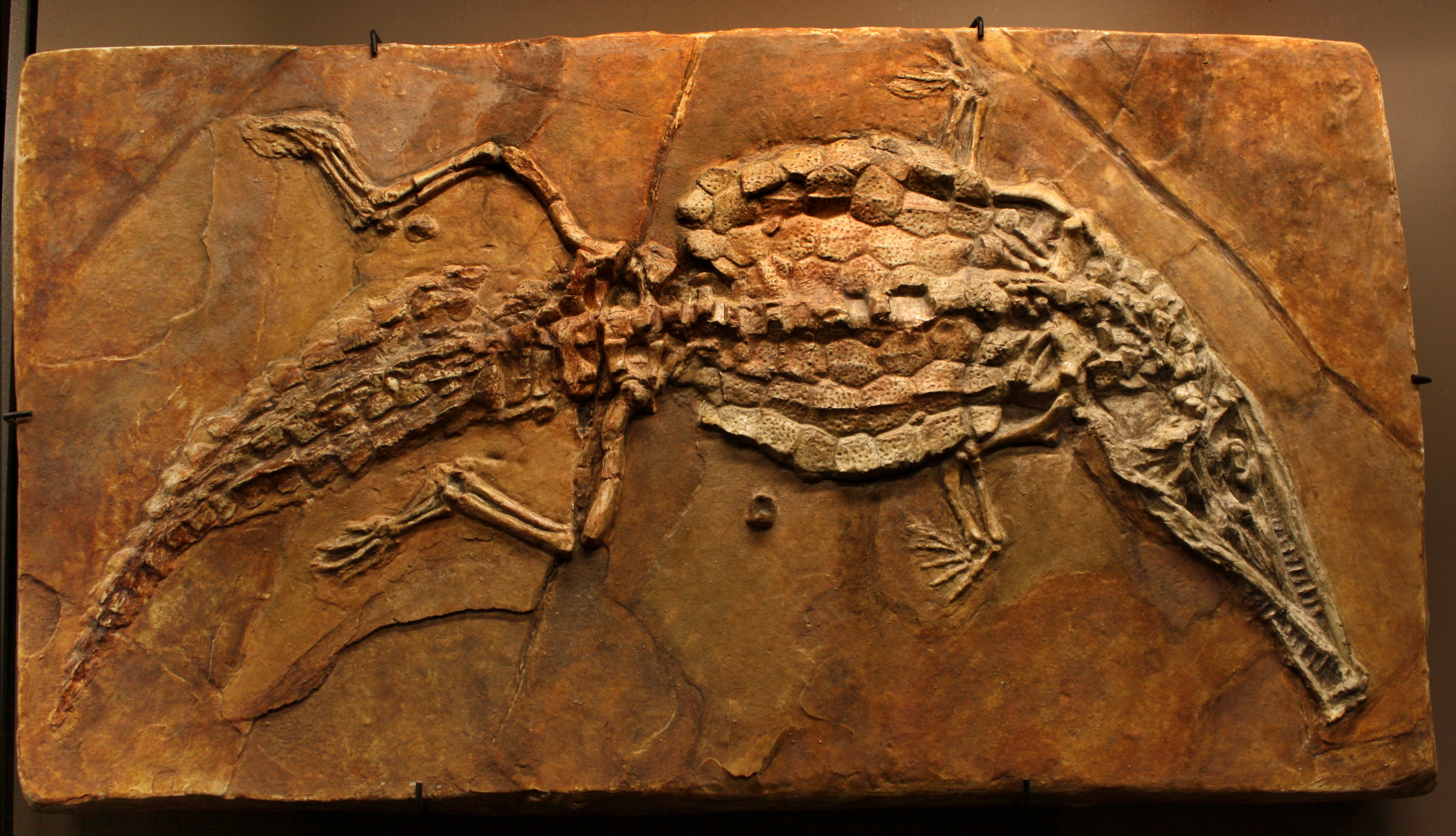
- Cast of Crocodilaemus robustus from the paleontological site of Serin, showcased in the Museum of Natural Sciences of Belgium.
- Type: Formation

Lithology
- Primary: Lithographic limestone

Location
- Coordinates: 45°46′44″N 05°33′15″E
- Region: Auvergne-Rhône-Alpes
- Country: France

Type section
- Named for: Cerin
- Year defined: 1838
- Cerin Lagerstätte (France)

The Cerin Lagerstätte is a fossil deposit of the Jura Mountains located in Cerin, a hamlet belonging to the commune of Marchamp in the department of Ain. The site is internationally known for its surprising diversity.

The deposits are located in what was a tropical lagoon at the end of the Kimmeridgian age (Late Jurassic). It is dated from the Aulacostephanus pseudomutabilis biozone, whose equivalent in the Mediterranean area is the Aulacostephanus eudoxus biozone, which dates to 153 Ma.

== Situation ==
The site belonging to the Bugey historical region was erected at 560 meters above the sea level and is located 20 km off Belley, 75 km off Lyon, 80 km off Grenoble and 90 km off Geneva.

== Lithographic limestone ==
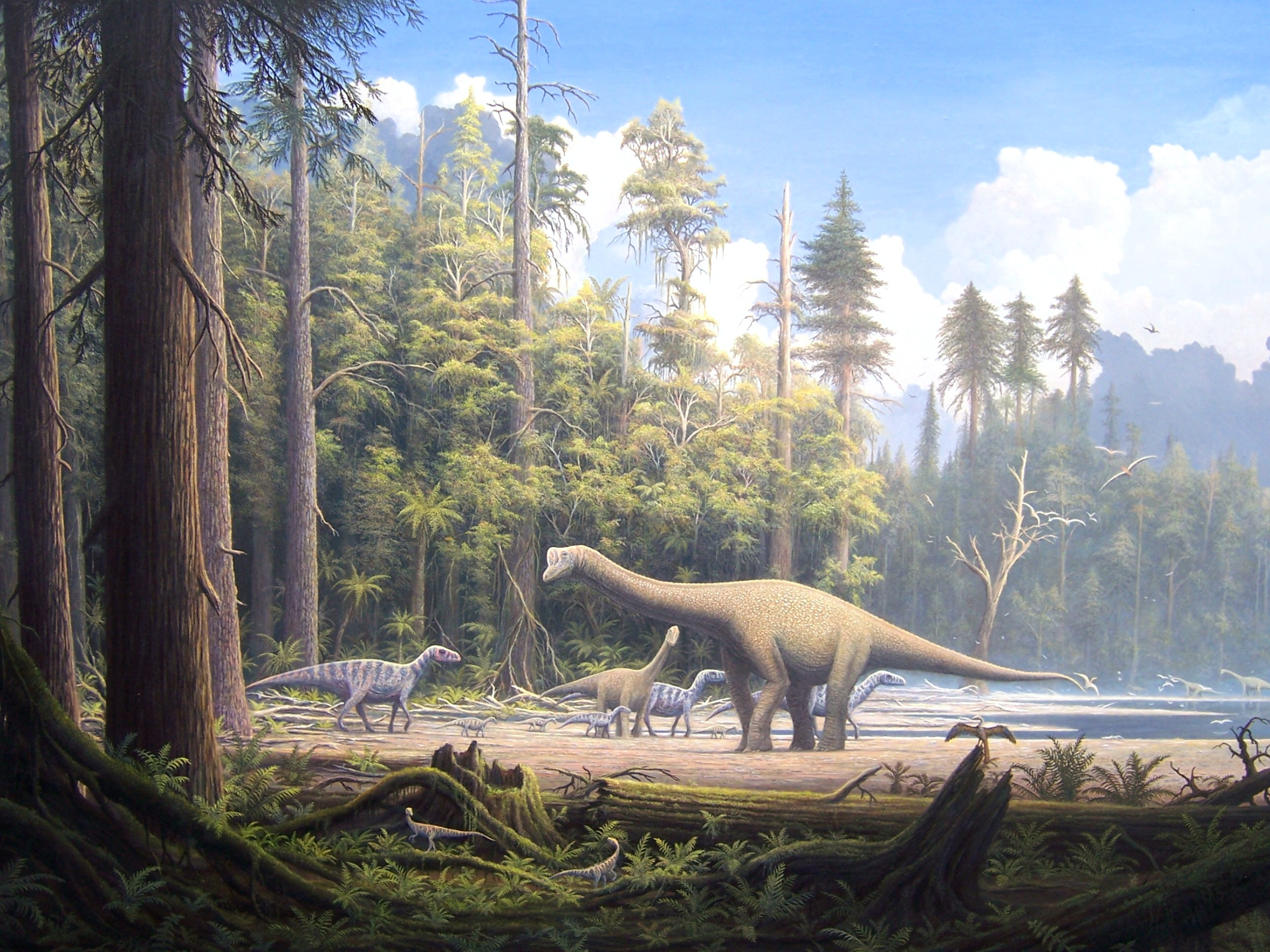
Artist view: A Jurassic European lagoon.

Cerin was reputed by the end of the 19th century for the quality of its lithographic limestone. The area was, during the Late Jurassic, a tropical lagoon. Lithographic limestone is formed by sedimentation of a very thin carbonated mud deposited at the bottom of a lagoon 153 million of years ago. Those deposits are disposed in strata.

The quarry exploitation, which began in 1835 during the lithography golden age, allowed to periodically uncover prints of prehistoric animals and plants fossilized in stone. Paleontology was at its beginning and those discoveries were still little-known.

== Site discovery ==
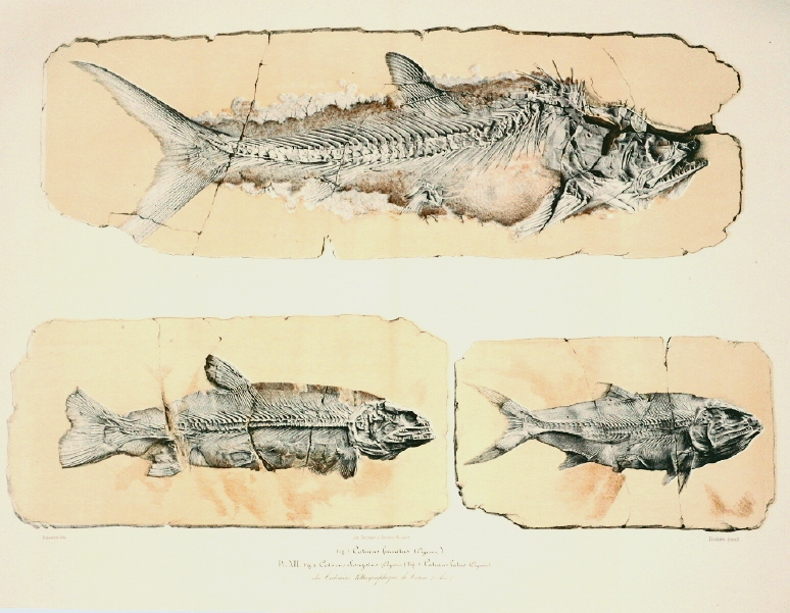
A lithographic plate from « Descriptions des poissons fossiles provenant des gisements coralliens du Jura dans le Bugey », by Victor Thiollière.

In 1838, thanks to the engineer Aimé Drian, a passionate amateur geologist, and Lyonese geologist, and Victor Thiollière, those fossils were discovered and the existence of the paleontological site of Cerin was revealed to the scientific world. The site has an international reputation and rivals with the Solnhofen Limestone, in Bavaria. Until his death, Victor Thiollière never ceased to collect and study a maximum of fossils from the site, and it was, in large part, thanks to his study of the Cerin fossils that he was recognized in the palaeontology world.

His works showed the similarities of the lithographic limestones of Cerin and Solnhofen. He described several new species of fish. He published in 1854 the first part of his "Description des poissons fossiles provenant des gisements coralliens du Jura dans le Bugey" ("Description of the fossil fish from the Jura corallian deposits in the Bugey"), but died shortly before the publication of the second part, the descriptions and lithographic plates already finished.

== Research on site ==
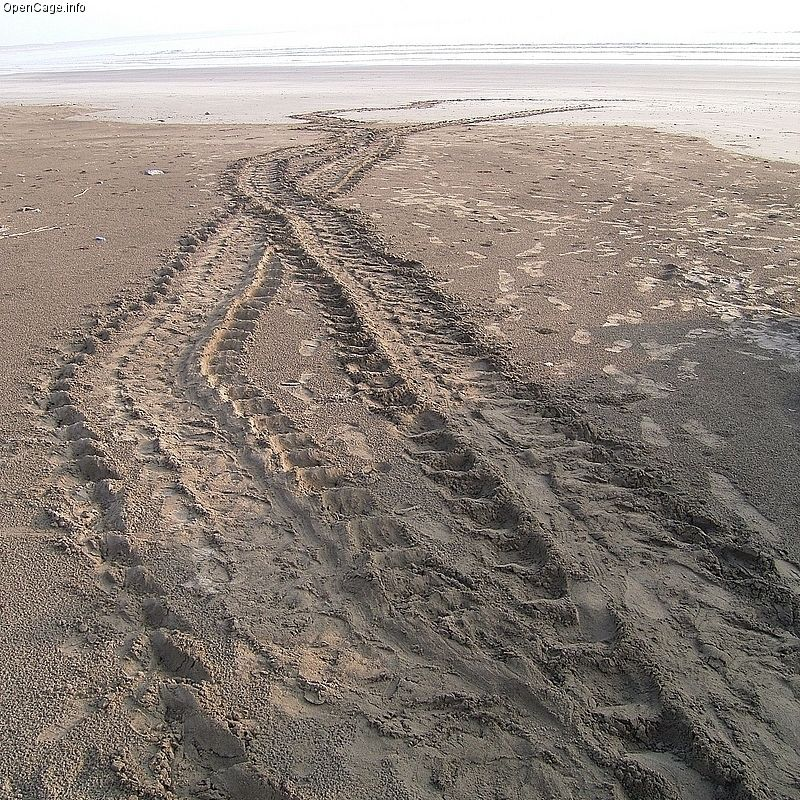
Turtle tracks on a Japanese beach.

Research on the Late Kimmeridgian site (Late Jurassic, around −153 Ma), occurred from 1975 to 1995, it was a unique operation and involved advanced technology. Directed by geologists from Claude Bernard University in Lyon, it necessitated heavy equipment of civil engineering.

This operation allowed the discovery of algae, ferns, conifers, molluscs, sea urchins, starfish, crustaceans such as the holotypes of Cyclerion bourseaui and Soleryon amicalis, reptiles, fish, as well as tracks of turtles and other reptiles. A thorough study permitted to determine the age and nature of the site (a tropical lagoon 153 million years old) and to understand the reasons of this exceptional fossilization.

A one-of-a-kind Late Jurassic fossilized track of prehistoric marine turtle was discovered in Cerin.

== Fossilization process in Cerin ==
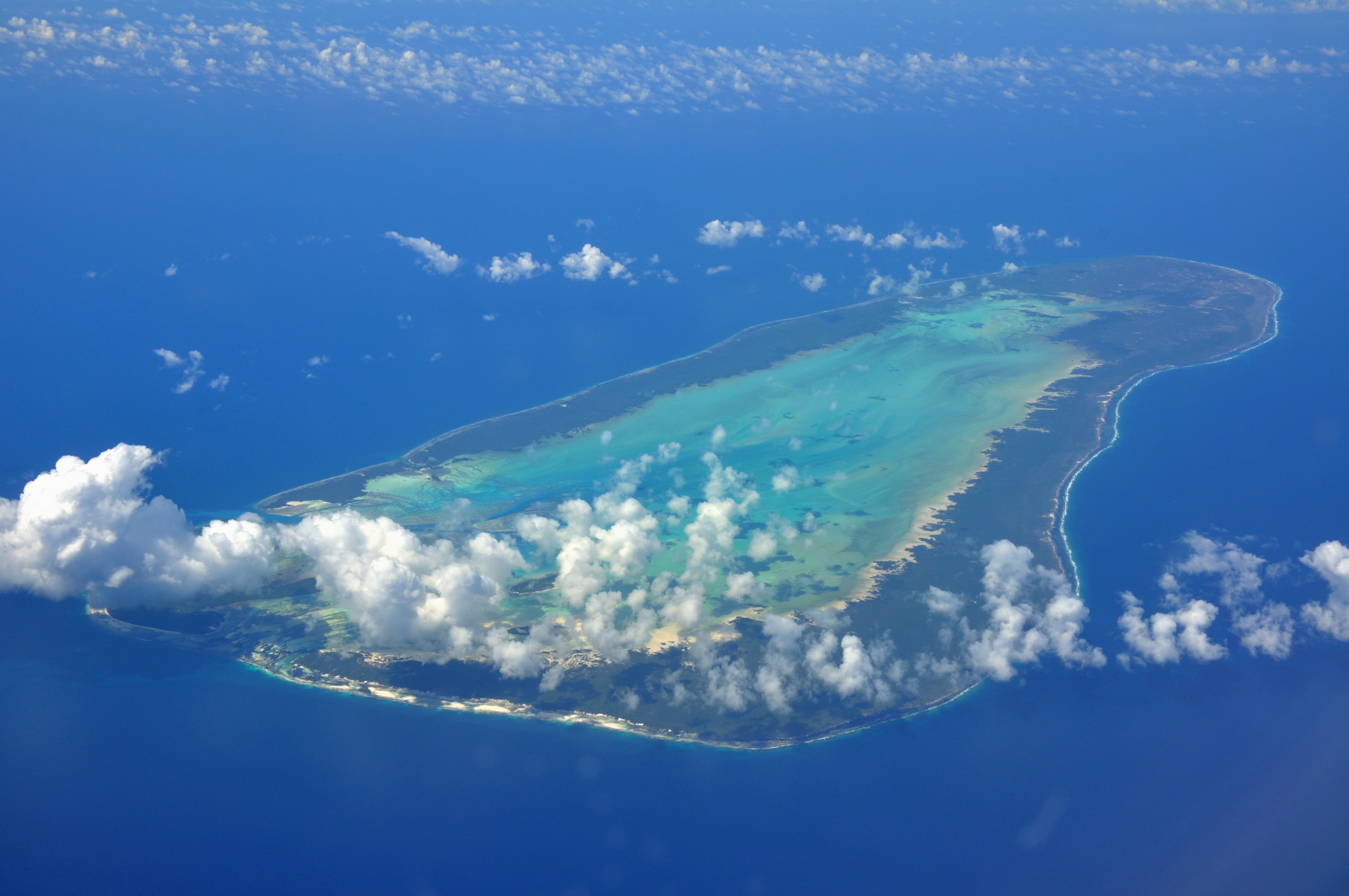
Aerial view of the Aldabra atoll and its lagoon.

To understand the fossilization process in Cerin, scientists went on an expedition to Aldabra in the Indian Ocean, to observe a fossilization process similar to the one that happened on the Cerin site.

153 million years ago, the climate was tropical. The lagoon had only few contacts with the open sea, and evaporation was intense. Terrestrial animals venturing in the lagoon shores left their tracks in a quickly drying mud.

During storms, a large quantity of saltwater, carrying mud, vegetal remains, and dead or alive animals, entered the lagoon; clearwater, brought by rains and water runoff, brought as well large quantities of particulate matters. When the calm was settling, the fine particles deposited in a regular layer which carpeted the depths and covered remains and tracks.

This layer gave then birth to a strata of lithographic limestone.

When evaporation made the water level drop again, it became under oxygenated and over-concentrated on salt, which led to the death of many living beings, while protecting their bodies from scavengers. The microbial mats, who thrived in this environment, covered the corpses and vegetal remains, helping their conservation as fossils.

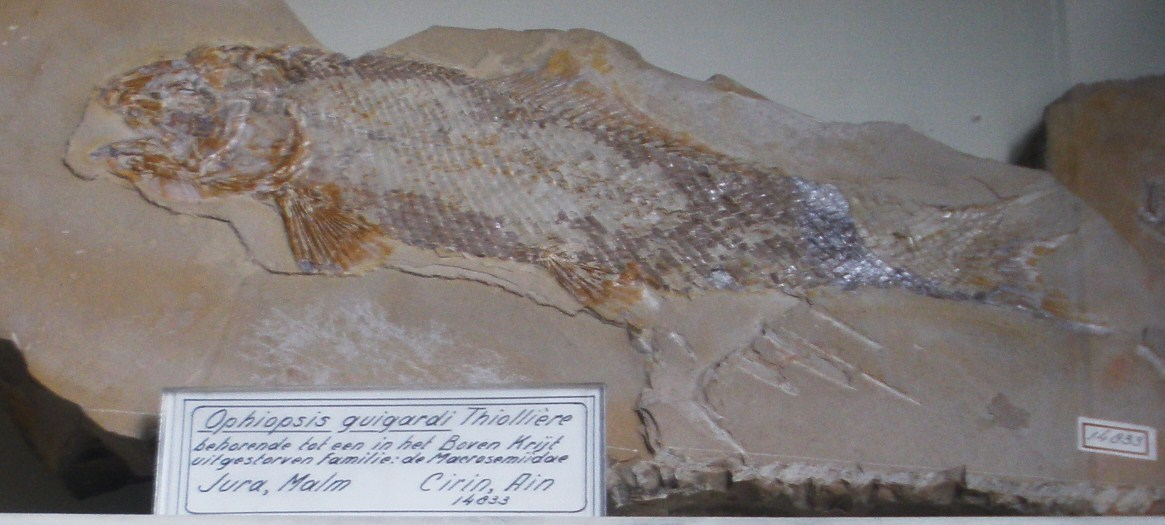
Ophiopsis guigardi

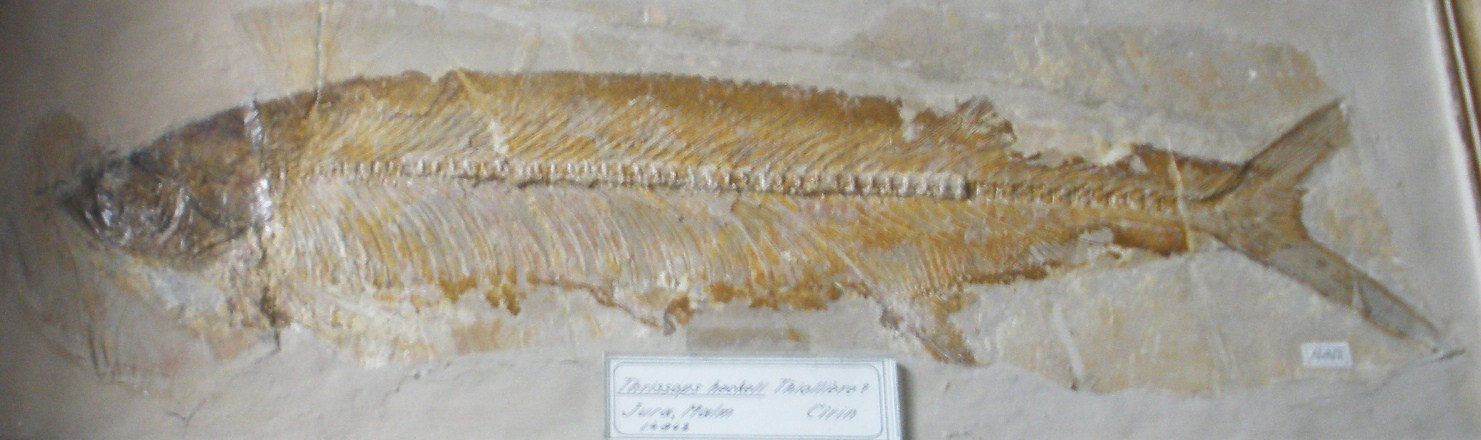
Thrissops henkeli

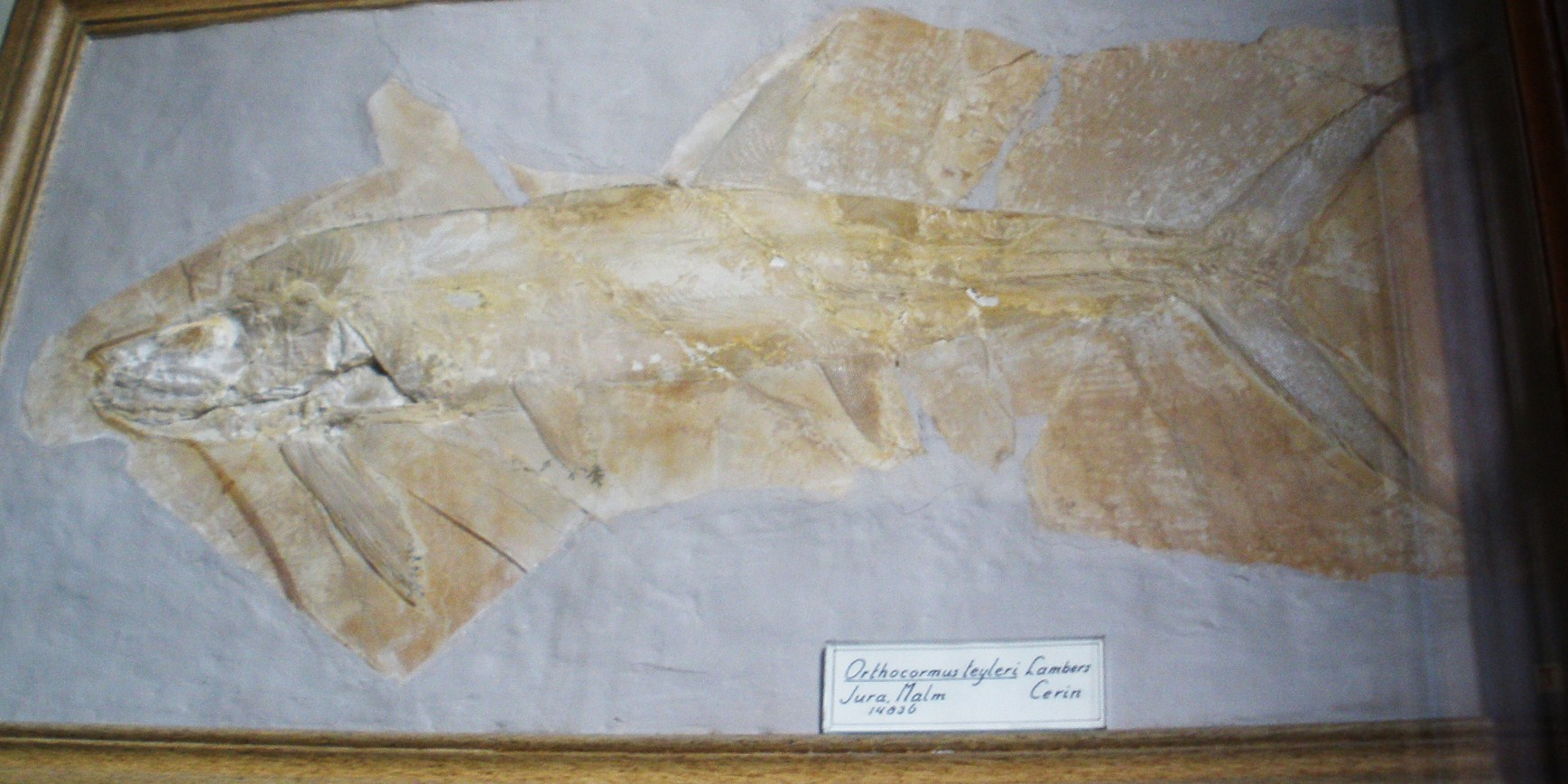
Orthocormus teyleri

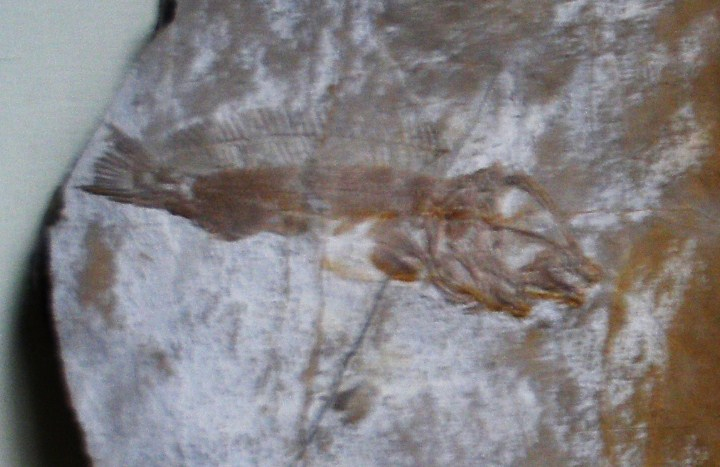
Macrosemius dumortieri

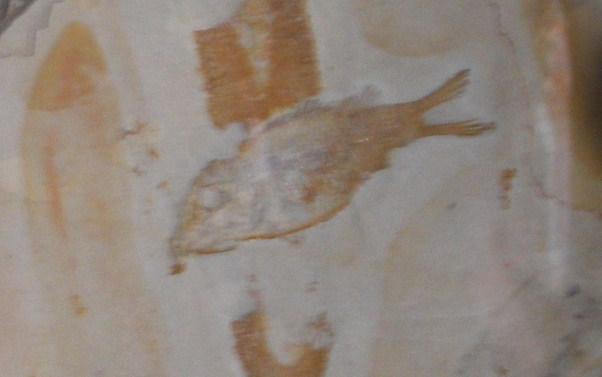
Notagogus cf. imimontis

== Biota ==
| Color key: Taxon / Reclassified taxon / Taxon falsely reported as present / Dubious taxon or junior synonym / Ichnotaxon / Ootaxon / Morphotaxon | Notes; Uncertain or tentative taxa are in small text; ~~crossed out~~ taxa are discredited. |

Algae

| Genus | Species | Classification | Note | Picture |
|---|---|---|---|---|
| Campbelliella | C. striata | Dasycladales | | |
| Clypeina | C. jurassica | Dasycladales | Clusters of this species attain more than 10 cm. | |
| Goniolina | G. janeti | Dasycladales | | |

Plants

| Genus | Species | Classification | Note | Picture |
|---|---|---|---|---|
| Apoldia | A. latifolia | Cycadales | | |
Brachyphyllum
| Brachyphyllum | B. desnoyersii | Pinales | | |
| Brachyphyllum | B. elegans | Pinales | | |
| Brachyphyllum | B. speciosa | Pinales | | |
| Crossozamia | | Cycadopsida | Formerly described as Cycalacis. | |
| Cupressinoxylon | C. sp | Coniferales | | |
| Cycadopteris | C. jurensis | Pteridospermatophyta | | |
| Pachypteris | | Pteridospermatophyta | | |
| Pagiophyllum | P. cirinicum | Araucariaceae | | |
| Zamites | Z. feneonis | Bennettitales | Very abundant in the site. | |
| Z. pumilio | Bennettitales | | | |

Cnidarians

| Genus | Species | Classification | Note | Picture |
|---|---|---|---|---|
| Bipedalia | B. cerinensis | Cubozoa | | |
| Paracarybdea | P. lithographica | Cubozoa | | |
| Paraurelia | P. cerinensis | Scyphozoa | | |
| Paraurelia | P. sp | Scyphozoa | | |

Lophotrochozoans

| Genus | Species | Classification | Note | Picture |
|---|---|---|---|---|
| Aspidoceras | A. cf. catalaunicum | Aspidoceratidae | | |
| Hibolites | | Belemnoidea | | |
| Laevaptychus | L. latus | | A kind of Aptychus. Formerly referred as Aptychus latus. | |
| Lithacoceras | L. cf. ulmense | Ataxioceratidae | | |
| Lithacoceras | L. sp. gr. siliceus | Ataxioceratidae | | |
| Lithacoceras | L. sp | Ataxioceratidae | Potentially a new species. | |
| Nanogyra | N. virgula | Bivalvia | | |
| Nerinea | N. suprajurensis | Gastropoda | | |
| Rhynchonellida | | Rhynchonellida | | |
| Subplanites | S. cf. rueppellianus | Perisphinctidae | | |
| Terebratulidae | | Terebratulidae | | |

Arthropods

| Genus | Species | Classification | Note | Picture |
|---|---|---|---|---|
| Antrimpos | A. speciosus | Penaeidae | | |
| Cycleryon | C. bourseaui | Eryonidae | | |
| Cycleryon | C. propinquus | Eryonidae | | |
| Dusa | D. monocera | Penaeidae | Its presence at Cerin might be a mistake caused by confusion due to misattribution of specimens hailing from the Solnhofen Limestone. | |
| Eryma | E. modestiformis | Erymidae | | |
| Eryon | E. arctiformis | Eryonidae | Its presence at Cerin might be a mistake caused by confusion due to misattribution of specimens hailing from the Solnhofen Limestone. | |
| Gigacerina | G. saemanni | Glypheoidea | One of the largest known glypheids. Formerly referred to as Glyphea saemanni. | |
| Glyphea | G. pseudoscyllarus | Glypheoidea | Macrourites cerensis is a synonym. | |
| Mecochirus | M. brevimanus | Glypheoidea | Its presence at Cerin might be a mistake caused by confusion due to misattribution of specimens hailing from the Solnhofen Limestone. This species is also considered a synonym of M. longimanatus, likely to represent a female morphotype. | |
| Mecochirus | M. sp | Glypheoidea | | |
| Mesolimulus | M. walchi | Limulidae | | |
| Soleryon | S. amicalis | Eryonidae | | |

Echinoderms

| Genus | Species | Classification | Note | Picture |
|---|---|---|---|---|
| Acrocidaris | A. nobilis | Euechinoidea | | |
| ?Ceramaster | ? C. chantrei | Goniasteridae | | |
| Cidaris | C. carinifera | Cidaroida | | |
| Comptoniaster | C. meyeri | Goniasteridae | | |
| Ophiopetra | O. lithographica | Aplocomidae | | |
| Pentasteria | P. lithographica | Astropectinidae | | |
| Pseudodiadema | P. cf. pseudodiadema | Pseudodiadematidae | | |
| Pygurus | | Clypeidae | | |
| Solanocrinites | S. thiollieri | Crinoidea | | |

Chondrichthyes

| Genus | Species | Classification | Note | Picture |
|---|---|---|---|---|
| Belemnobatis | B. sismondae | Asterodermidae | | |
| Corysodon | C. cirinensis | Carcharhiniformes | The genus Corysodon has been synonymized with Palaeoscyllium by Cappetta, 1987. However the validity of Corysodon was maintained by Thies & Candoni, 1998, this was related by later studies. | |
| Phorcynis | P. catulina | Squatiniformes | | |
| Spathobatis | S. bugesiacus | Asterodermidae | | |

Sarcopterygians

| Genus | Species | Classification | Note | Picture |
|---|---|---|---|---|
| Undina | U. cirinensis | Latimeriidae | This species was classified as a member of the genus Holophagus by Wenz et al., 1994. However, Ferrante & Cavin, 2025 considered H. gulo as the only Holophagus species. | |

Actinopterygians

| Genus | Species | Classification | Note | Picture |
|---|---|---|---|---|
| Ainia | A. armata | Halecomorphi | | |
| Allothrissops | A. regleyi | Ichthyodectiformes | Formerly placed in the genus Thrissops. | |
| Amblysemius | A. bellicianus | Caturidae | | |
| Anaethalion | A. affinis | Elopiformes | | |
| Anaethalion | A. cirinensis | Elopiformes | | |
| Anaethalion | A. knorri | Elopiformes | | |
| Anaethalion | A. cf. subovatus | Elopiformes | | |
| Ankylophorus | A. similis | Ankylophoridae | Formerly placed in the genus Pholidophorus. | |
| Apomesodon | A. comosus | Pycnodontiformes | Synonym of A. gibbosus. | |
| Apomesodon | A. gibbosus | Pycnodontiformes | Formerly referred to as Eomesodon gibbosus. | |
| Apomesodon | A. surgens | Pycnodontiformes | Synonym of A. gibbosus. | |
| Aspidorhynchus | A. acutirostris | Aspidorhynchidae | | |
| Belonostomus | B. tenuirostris | Aspidorhynchidae | Some authors are more prudent about the identification of this species as B. tenuirostris. | |
| Belonostomus | B. sp. | Aspidorhynchidae | At least one more species is present in Cerin, it is similar to B. kochii. | |
| Caturus | C. furcatus | Caturidae | | |
| Cerinichthys | C. koelblae | Halecomorphi | | |
| Eoprotelops | E. vireti | Elopiformes | | |
| Gyrodus | "G". hexagonus | Pycnodontiformes | The specimens from Cerin probably belong to a more derived pycnodontiform, it might not be the same species as Gyrodus hexagonus. | |
| Gyrodus | G. sp. | Pycnodontiformes | Specimens from Cerin were formerly referred to as Mesturus verrucosus. | |
| Ionoscopus | I. desori | Amiiformes | | |
| Lehmanophorus | L. segusianus | Ankylophoridae | Formerly referred to as Pholidophorus segusianus. | |
| Leptolepides | L. sp. | Orthogonikleithridae | There might be more than one species present in Cerin. | |
| Macromesodon | M. macropterus | Pycnodontiformes | Formerly referred to as Coelodus jourdani, which is now considered a junior synonym. | |
| Macrosemius | M. fourneti | Macrosemiidae | | |
| Notagogus | N. helenae | Macrosemiidae | | |
| Notagogus | N. inimontis | Macrosemiidae | | |
| Oligopleurus | O. esocinus | Halecomorphi | | |
| Ophiopsiella | O. guigardi | Halecomorphi | Formerly referred to as Ophiopsis guigardi. | |
| Ophiopsiella | O. macrodus | Halecomorphi | Formerly referred to as Ophiopsis macrodus. | |
| Ophiopsiella | O. procera | Halecomorphi | Specimens from Cerin were formerly referred to as Ophiopsis attenuata. | |
| Ophiopsis | O. muensteri | Ionoscopiformes | The occurrence from Cerin was formerly described as Furo praelongus. However, this species has been synomymized with Furo muensteri. This species was moved to the genus Ophiopsis after a taxonomic reassessment. | |
| Orthocormus | O. teyleri | Pachycormiformes | | |
| Orthogonikleithrus | O. francogalliensis | Orthogonikleithridae | Specimens previously assigned to Leptolepides sprattiformis belong to this species. | |
| Orthogonikleithrus | O. sp. | Orthogonikleithridae | There is at least one more species of Orthogonikleithrus. Specimens previously referred to Ascalabos voithi actually belong to O. sp. | |
| Palaeomacrosemius | P. thiollieri | Macrosemiidae | | |
| Pholidophorichthys | P. inermis | Pholidophoridae | | |
| Pholidophoristion | P. cf. ovatus | Pholidophoridae | | |
| "Pholidophorus" | "P". velifer | Caturidae | Formerly known as Caturus velifer, it surely does not belong to Caturus. Its taxonomic statue is still unclear and is being studied. | |
| Pleuropholis | P. thiolleri | Pleuropholidae | | |
| Propterus | P. microstomus | Semionotiformes | Material from Cerin was previously described as Histionotus falsani. This species was later regarded as a synonym of Histionotus oberndorferi, itself synonymized with Propterus microstomus. | |
| Proscinetes | P. bernardi | Pycnodontiformes | | |
| Proscinetes | P. distantidens | Pycnodontiformes | | |
| Proscinetes | P. elegans | Pycnodontiformes | | |
| Proscinetes | P. intermedius | Pycnodontiformes | | |
| Proscinetes | P. itieri | Pycnodontiformes | | |
| Proscinetes | P. sauvanausi | Pycnodontiformes | | |
| Proscinetes | P. thiolleri | Pycnodontiformes | | |
| Scheenstia | S. laevis | Lepisosteiformes | Formerly referred to as Lepidotes laevis. | |
| Solnhofenamia | S. elongata | Amiidae | Formerly placed in the genus Urocles as U. elongatus. | |
| Tharsis | T. dubius | Ascalaboidiformes | | |
| Thiollierepycnodus | T. wagneri | Pycnodontiformes | Formerly referred to as Gyrodus wagneri. | |
| Thrissops | T. cirinensis | Ichthyodectiformes | | |
| Thrissops | T. formosus | Ichthyodectiformes | | |
| Turboscinetes | T. egertoni | Pycnodontiformes | Formerly referred to as Proscinetes egertoni. | |

Reptiles

| Genus | Species | Classification | Note | Picture |
|---|---|---|---|---|
| Achelonia | A. formosa | Eurysternidae | | |
| Alligatorellus | A. beaumonti | Atoposauridae | | |
| Alligatorium | A. meyeri | Atoposauridae | | |
| Atoposaurus | A. jourdani | Atoposauridae | | |
| Crocodilaemus | C. robustus | Pholidosauridae | Sometimes orthographied Crocodileimus. | |
| Euposaurus | E. cirinensis | Rhynchocephalia | Sometimes orthographied as E. cerinensis. This species certainly does not belong to Euposaurus. | |
| Euposaurus | E. lorteti | Rhynchocephalia | This species certainly does not belong to Euposaurus. | |
| Euposaurus | E. thiollierei | Lepidosauromorpha | Sometimes orthographied as E. thiollieri. This species is known from a single young individual and might be a lizard. | |
| Gavialinum | G. rhodani | Teleosauroidea | This species is now regarded as a nomen dubium. | |
| Homoeosaurus | H. jourdani | Rhynchocephalia | Synonym of H. maximiliani. | |
| Homoeosaurus | H. maximiliani | Rhynchocephalia | | |
| Homoeosaurus | H. rhodani | Rhynchocephalia | | |
| Hydropelta | H. meyeri | Eurysternidae | | |
| Idiochelys | I. fitzingeri | Eurysternidae | | |
| Kallimodon | K. cerinensis | Rhynchocephalia | | |
| Kallimodon | K. pulchellus | Rhynchocephalia | | |
| Piocormus | P. cf. laticeps | Rhynchocephalia | Some authors have argued that Piocormus might be the same as Sapheosaurus. | |
| Pleurosaurus | P. goldfussi | Pleurosauridae | A rhynchocephalian particularly well adapted to an aquatic lifestyle. | |
| Pterodactylus | P. cirinensis | Pterosauria | Now considered an indeterminate pterosaur. | |
| Sapheosaurus | S. thiollierei | Rhynchocephalia | | |
| Stelliosaurus | | | This genus is old (Gervais, 1871) and poorly documented, for those reasons, it is considered a nomen nudum and might instead be considered a synonym of Homoeosaurus. | |

== Museum ==
- The Musée des Confluences showcases 24 fossils from Cerin, some of them found by Victor Thiollière;
- The Musée paléoécologique de Cerin;
- The Museum of Natural Sciences showcases casts of fossils from the site of Cerin.des moulages de fossiles issus du site de Cerin;
- The Teylers Museum in Haarlem (Netherlands) showcases fossils from Cerin.

== See also ==
- Solnhofen Limestone
- Canjuers Lagerstätte
- Mörnsheim Formation

== Bibliography and further reading ==
- Victor Thiollière, Descriptions des poissons fossiles provenant des gisements coralliens du Jura dans le Bugey, Paris, Editions J.-B. Baillière, 1854.
- Victor Thiollière et Paul Gervais, Descriptions des poissons fossiles provenant des gisements coralliens du Jura dans le Bugey. 2e partie. Revue et annotée par Paul Gervais avec l'aide de Gaston de Saporta, Falsan et Dumortier, Lyon, Éditions H. Georg, 1873.
- Louis David, Une lagune tropicale au temps des dinosaures, édition du CNRS, 1985.
