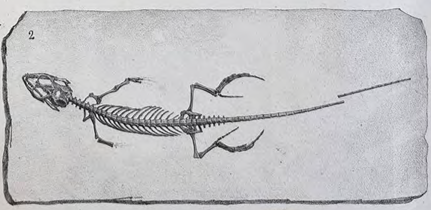
- Holotype specimen of Euposaurus thiollierei.

Scientific classification
- Kingdom: Animalia
- Phylum: Chordata
- Class: Reptilia
- Clade: Lepidosauromorpha
- Superorder: Lepidosauria
- Genus: †Euposaurus; Gervais, 1871
- Species: †E. thiollierei

Binomial name
- †Euposaurus thiollierei Lortet, 1892

= Euposaurus =

Euposaurus Temporal range: Kimmeridgian

Extinct genus of late Jurassic lepidosaur

Euposaurus is an extinct genus of lepidosaur from the late Jurassic Cerin Lagerstätte in the Auvergne-Rhône-Alpes region, France. It was originally considered a member or the family Euposauridae. However, it was reclassified as a lepidosaur incertae sedis. Only one species is currently accepted : E. thiollierei.

== History and species ==
All specimens are from the Cerin Lagerstätte.

The genus Euposaurus was first introduced by Jourdan in 1862 on the basis of one specimen, however, the name was unavailable because of the lack of formal description or reference to a published figure until Gervais, 1871 actually describes the genus and makes it valid. The type species E. thiollierei is described by Lortet, 1892 as E. thiollieri. However this orthograph is incorrect and has to be corrected as E. thiollierei. The specific name honors Victor Thiollière, who worked on fossils from Cerin.

Lortet, 1892 also named E. cerinensis on the basis of two specimens. Hoffstetter, 1964, considered that these two specimens were too different and named a new species for one of them : E. lorteti.

Evans, 1994 revised the three specimens and concluded that E. cerinensis and E. lorteti both represent juveniles of different rhynchocephalians species. The specimen 15.681 ("E. cerinensis") may be a juvenile of Homoeosaurus while the specimen 15.682 ("E. lorteti") is an indeterminate genus similar to Sapheosaurus, Piocormus, Kallimodon ans Leptosaurus. E. thiollierei is the only accepted species.

== Description ==
The sole specimen of E. thiollierei measures 66 mm in total length. It is fossilized in dorsal view and the skull is poorly preserved. The ossification state suggests that the individual died young, possibly a few weeks after birth.

The orbits are large, the parietal bone is large, the quadrate is narrow. A large hole is observed in the back of the skull, it is likely unnatural and does not correspond to a foramen as suggested by some authors. The right lower jaw preserves 26 positions for small, sharp and pleurodont teeth. The labial wall, which is the outer bony wall of the jaw, is notably high. The subdental shelf, a bony ridge on the inner side of the jaw below the teeth, is visible above what appears to be a Meckelian groove.

The postcranial skeleton is better preserved. The vertebrae are small and delicate. The neural arches of the vertebrae are not completely developed and fused, this represents evidence of the early grow state of the individual. There are 7 or 8 cervical vertebrae, they are short and bear small transverse processes. There are 19 to 20 dorsal vertebrae, they are a bit longer than the cervical vertebrae. There are two sacral vertebrae. There are more than 30 caudal vertebrae, the first seven bear strong transverse processes. Every single dorsal vertebrae carry a pair of ribs except the last two.

The pectoral girdle is very poorly preserved. The anterior limbs are completely preserved except for the distal-most elements of the hand. The left hand is not preserved. The different parts of the pelvis are separate. The ilia and the pubes are visible while the ischia are hidden by the sacral ribs. The hindlimbs are longer than the forelimbs, however the femur is quite short. The foot is 2.3 times the size of the femur. The phalangeal formula is the following : 2:3:4:5:4.

== Classification ==
In 1892, Lortet classified E. thiollierei as a member of the Sphenodontidae. Boulenger, 1893, disagreed with this statement and affirmed that E. thiollierei is a true lizard similar to the anguids. This interpretation was accepted by Nopsca, 1908. In 1923, Camp created the family Euposauridae for E. thiollierei and specified that the attribution of E. cerinensis to the genus may be doubtful. He also placed this family among the suborder Anguimorpha. In 1963, on the basis of a reinterpretation of the Euposaurus material, Cocude-Michel disagreed with this classification and stated that Euposaurus is more similar to the group Iguania and particularly to the family Agamidae. She also considered that E. cerinensis was indeed part of the same genus as E. thiollierei. The classification within Iguania was related by some authors while others like Gauthier et al., 1988 agreed with the original rhynchocephalian identification. Evans, 1994, revised Euposaurus and concluded that the lack of acrodont dentition in E. thiollierei distinguishes it from rhynchocephalians. However, this does not necessarily make it a lizard, the basal genus Marmoretta of the late Jurassic proves that non-rhynchocephalian nor squamate ancient lineages still existed when Euposaurus lived. It differs in its overall body shape, dentition and vertebral count from confirmed late Jurassic squamate taxa like Eichstaettisaurus or Ardeosaurus. Its dentition and jaw features resemble some scincomorphs. However, the juvenile state of the only specimen makes a more precise classification impossible, thus, it is referred to as a Lepidosauria incertae sedis.

== Paleoenvironment ==
Euposaurus is from the Cerin Lagerstätte, a konservat-lagerstätte that represents a late Kimmeridgian small tropical lagoon. It likely contained temporarily stagnant and poorly oxygenated waters. Storms could have brought sea water and marine organisms that likely died in the lagoon without being able to escape. This environment, ichnofossils and taphonomic conditions of Cerin are very comparable to the modern Aldabra atoll. Numerous rhynchocephalians such as Homoeosaurus, Kallimodon, Leptosaurus, Piocormus and Sapheosaurus, atoposaurids such as Alligatorellus, Alligatorium and Atoposaurus, the pholidosaurid Crocodilaemus and several turtles are reported from Cerin.
