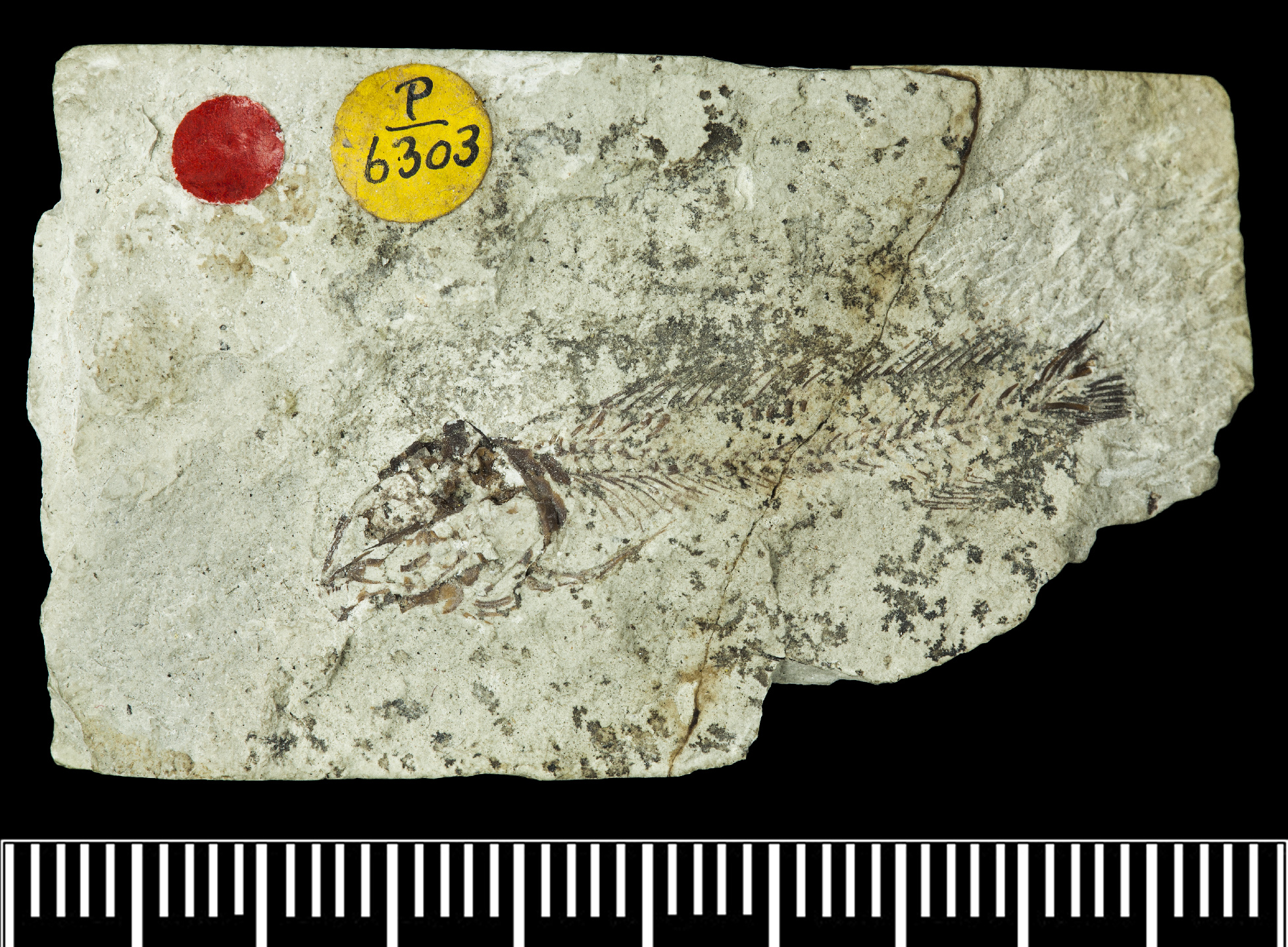
- Specimen of E. andrewsi

Scientific classification
- Kingdom: Animalia
- Phylum: Chordata
- Class: Actinopterygii
- Clade: Ginglymodi
- Order: †Semionotiformes
- Family: †Macrosemiidae
- Genus: †Enchelyolepis; Woodward, 1918

Type species
- †Macrosemius andrewsi Woodward, 1895

Species
- †E. andrewsi (Woodward, 1895); †E. pectoralis (Sauvage, 1883)

= Enchelyolepis =

Enchelyolepis Temporal range: Tithonian–Berriasian

Extinct genus of fishes

Enchelyolepis (meaning "eel-like scale") is an extinct genus of prehistoric marine ray-finned fish known from the Late Jurassic and Early Cretaceous of Europe. It was a member of the Macrosemiidae, a family of ginglymodians distantly related to modern gars, and contains two species that were both previously described as species of Macrosemius.

The following species are known:

- †E. andrewsi (Woodward, 1895) (type species) - Early Cretaceous (Berriasian) of England (middle Purbeck Group)
- †E. pectoralis (Sauvage, 1883) - Late Jurassic (Tithonian) of France (Portland Group)

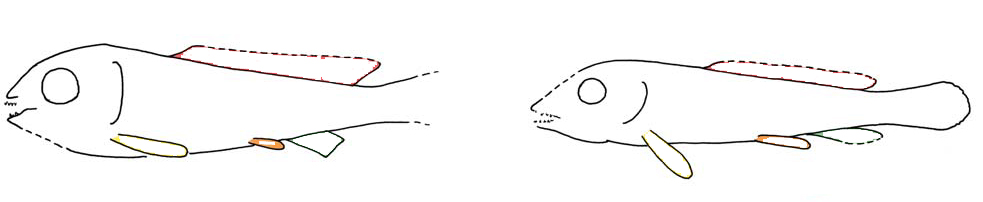
Morphological comparison of E. andrewsi (left) and E. pectoralis (right)

Both species were very small for their order, with E. andrewsi being only 35 millimetres (1.4 in) in length.

== See also ==
- Prehistoric fish
- List of prehistoric bony fish
