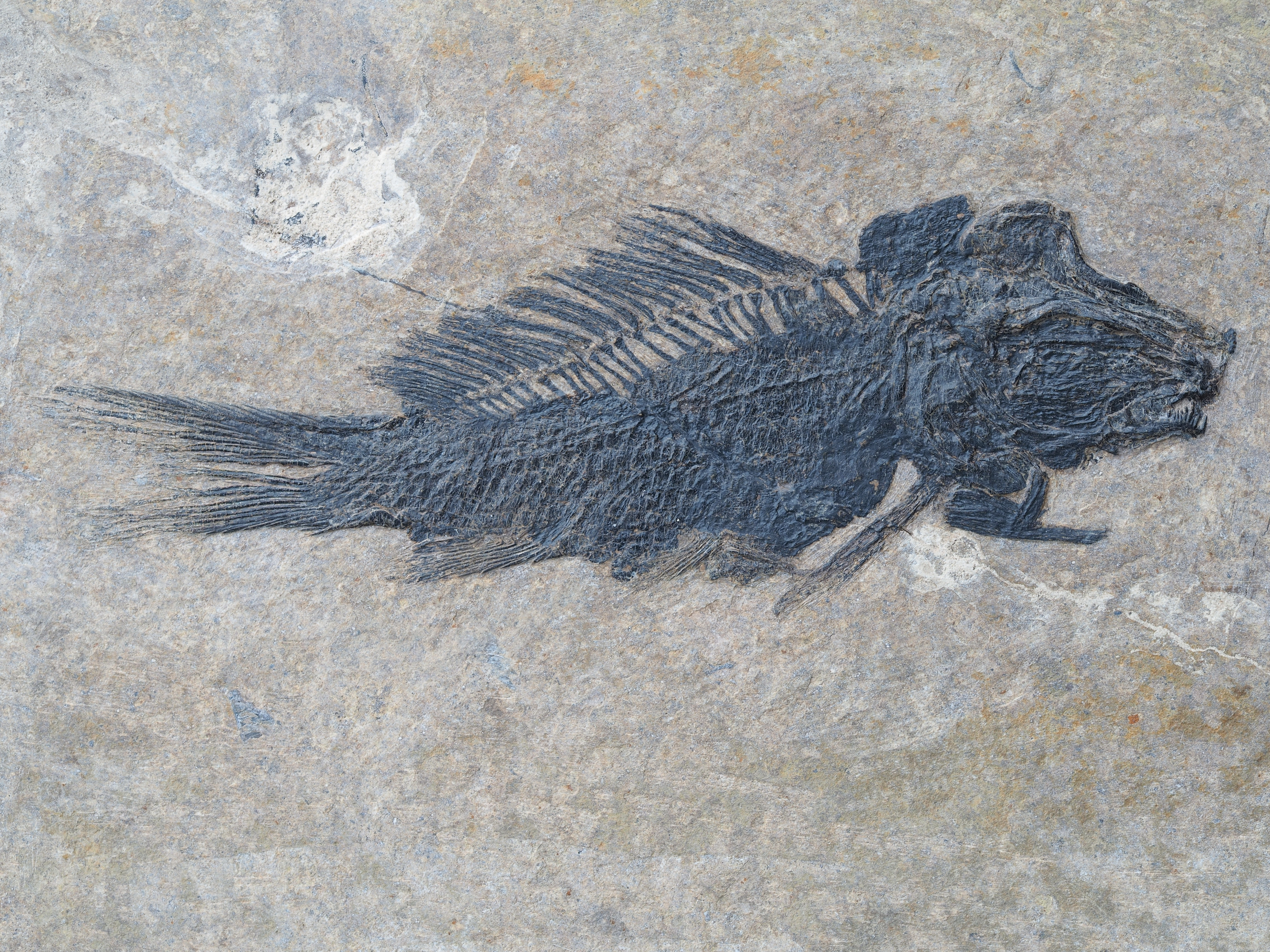
- †Legnonotus krambergeri from the Triassic of Bergamo, Italy.

Scientific classification
- Kingdom: Animalia
- Phylum: Chordata
- Class: Actinopterygii
- Clade: Ginglymodi
- Order: †Semionotiformes
- Family: †Macrosemiidae
- Genus: †Legnonotus; Egerton, 1854

Type species
- †Legnonotus cothamensis Egerton, 1854

Species
- L. cothamensis Egerton, 1854; L. krambergeri Bartram, 1977; L. obtusus Tintori & Renesto, 1983

= Legnonotus =

Legnonotus Temporal range: Late Triassic (Norian to Rhaetian) Possible Middle Triassic (Ladinian) occurrence

Extinct genus of fishes

Legnonotus is an extinct genus of prehistoric marine ray-finned fish from the Middle to Late Triassic of Europe. It is the oldest known member of the family Macrosemiidae.

Three species are known, although the assignment of the oldest species to this genus is uncertain:

- L. cothamensis Egerton, 1854 (type species) - Late Triassic (Rhaetian) of England (Westbury Formation)
- L. krambergeri Bartram, 1977 - Late Triassic (Norian) of Austria (Seefelder Formation) & Italy (Calcare di Zorzino), potentially Rhaetian of Austria (Kössen Formation)
- ?L. obtusus Tintori & Renesto, 1983 - Middle Triassic (Ladinian) of Italy (Meride Limestone of Monte San Giorgio)

It is likely the sister genus to Macrosemius, the type genus of the family. Based on its morphology, it likely inhabited reef habitats, where it darted among raised structures to hunt small invertebrates. Its forked caudal fin may have also allowed it to inhabit more open-water habitats.

Specimen of ?L. obtusus

== See also ==
- Prehistoric fish
- List of prehistoric bony fish
