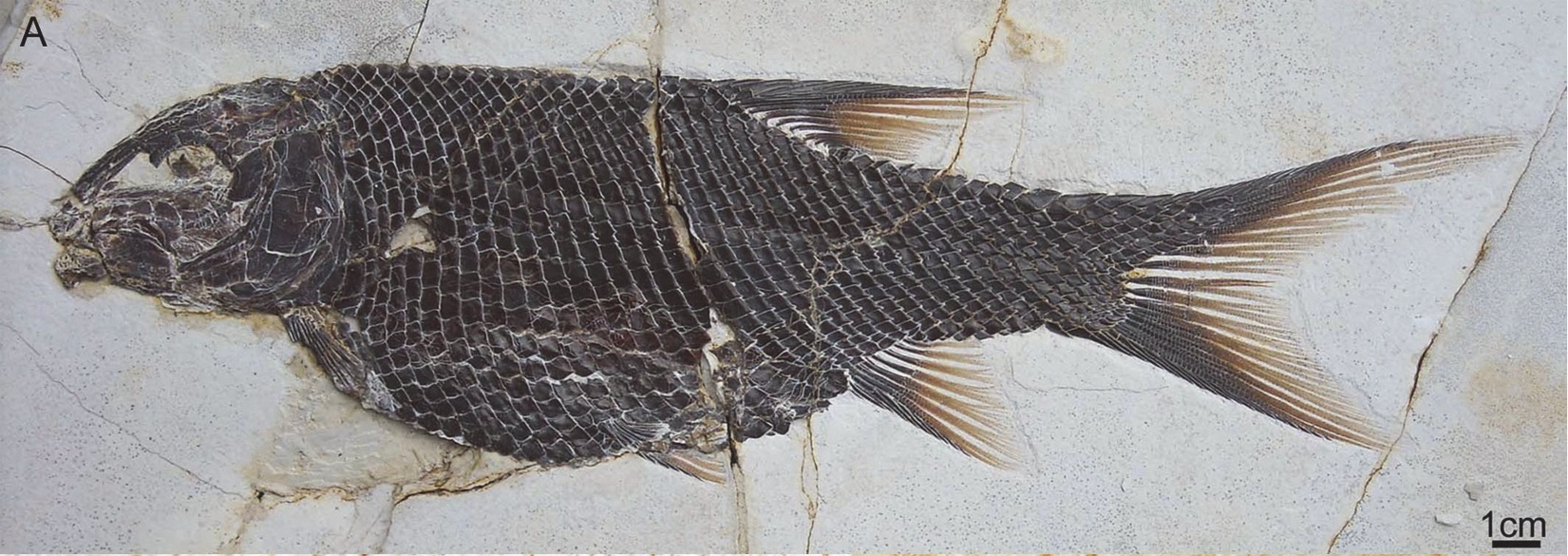
- Fossil specimen of Macrosemimimus fegerti
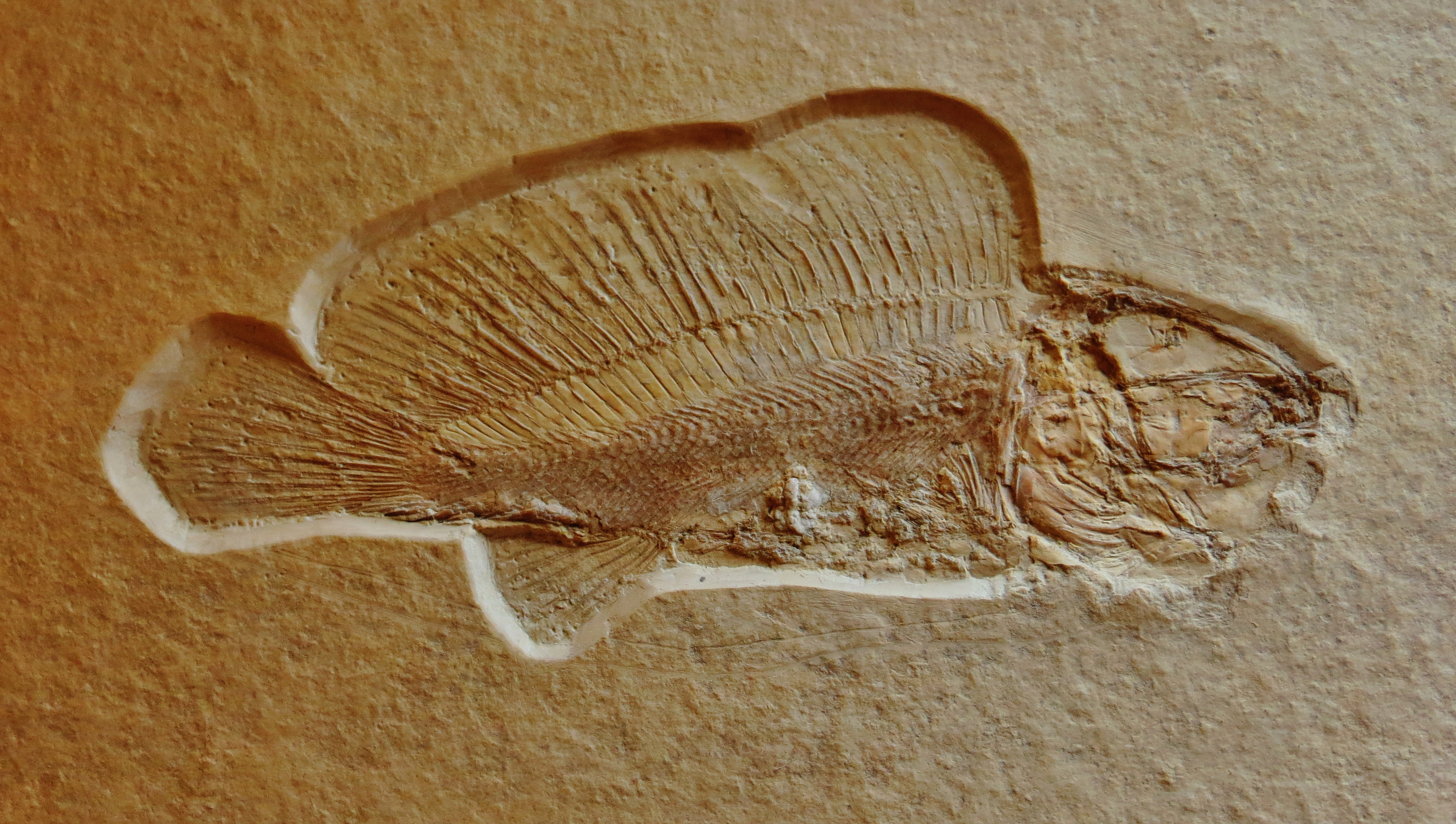
- Fossil of Macrosemius

Scientific classification
- Kingdom: Animalia
- Phylum: Chordata
- Class: Actinopterygii
- Clade: Ginglymodi
- Clade: Neoginglymodi
- Order: †Semionotiformes; Arambourg & Bertini 1958 sensu López-Arbarello 2012

Type genus
- †Semionotus Agassiz, 1843

Families
- Callipurbeckiidae; Macrosemiidae; Semionotidae; ? Dapediidae

Synonyms
- Macrosemiiformes Grande & Bemis 1998

= Semionotiformes =

Semionotiformes Temporal range: Anisian–Maastrichtian

Extinct order of fishes

Semionotiformes is an order of ray-finned fish known from the Middle Triassic (Anisian) to the Late Cretaceous (Maastrichtian). It is the sister group to Lepisosteiformes, the order containing fish such as Lepidotes and Gars. The group includes both freshwater (Semionotidae) and marine (Callipurbeckiidae, Macrosemiidae) adapted forms. Many members of the family Macrosemiidae, had elongated dorsal fins, often associated with an adjacent area of skin which was free of scales. These fins were likely undulated for use in precision swimming. The body morphology of macrosemiids suggests that they were slow swimmers who were capable of maneuvering around complex topography, such as reef environments.

== Classification ==
- Order †Semionotiformes Arambourg & Bertin 1958 sensu López-Arbarello 2012
  - Genus ?†Orthurus Kner 1866
  - Genus ?†Aphanepygus Bassani 1879
  - Genus †Alleiolepis Heller 1953
  - Genus †Aphelolepis Heller 1953
  - Genus †Austrolepidotes Bocchino, 1974
  - Genus †Corunegenys Wade, 1942
  - Genus †Pericentrophorus Jorg 1969
  - Genus †Prionopleurus Fischer de Waldheim 1852
  - Genus †Quasimodichthys Paiva and Gallo 2018
  - Genus †Sinosemionotus Yuan and Koh 1936
  - Genus †Uarbryichthys Wade 1941
  - Family †Macrosemiidae Wagner 1860a corrig. Cope 1889 sensu Murray & Wilson 2009 [Macrosemii Wagner 1860a]
    - Genus †Enchelyolepis Woodward 1918
    - Genus †Palaeomacrosemius Ebert, Lane & Kolbl-Ebert 2016
    - Genus †Voelklichthys Arratia & Schultze 2012
    - Genus †Notagogus Agassiz 1833-1844 [Neonotagogus Bravi 1994]
    - Genus †Agoultichthys Murray & Wilson 2009
    - Genus †Histionotus Egerton 1854
    - Genus †Propterus Agassiz 1833-1844 [Rhynchoncodes Costa 1850]
    - Genus †Macrosemiocotzus González-Rodríguez, Applegate & Espinosa-Arrubarrena 2004
    - Genus †Legnonotus Egerton 1853
    - Genus †Macrosemius Agassiz 1833-1844
  - Family †Semionotidae Woodward 1890 sensu López-Arbarello 2012
    - Genus †Semionotus Agassiz 1832 (Usually considered a wastebasket taxon)
    - Genus †Lophionotus Gibson 2013
  - Family †Callipurbeckiidae López-Arbarello 2012 [Paralepidotidae Hadding 1919 ex Lund 1920]
    - Genus †Occitanichthys López-Arbarello & Wencker 2016
    - Genus †Semiolepis Lombardo & Tintori 2008
    - Genus †Paralepidotus Stolley 1919
    - Genus †Macrosemimimus Schröder, López-Arbarello & Ebert 2012
    - Genus †Tlayuamichin López-Arbarello & Alvarado-Ortega 2011
    - Genus †Callipurbeckia López-Arbarello 2012
