= Petalopteryx =

Petalopteryx Temporal range: Early Cretaceous

Scientific classification
- Domain: Eukaryota
- Kingdom: Animalia
- Phylum: Chordata
- Class: Actinopterygii
- Clade: Ginglymodi
- Order: †Semionotiformes
- Family: †Macrosemiidae
- Genus: †Petalopteryx; Pictet, 1850

Extinct genus of fishes

Petalopteryx is an extinct genus of prehistoric ray-finned fish that lived during the Early Cretaceous epoch.

== See also ==
- Prehistoric fish
- List of prehistoric bony fish
