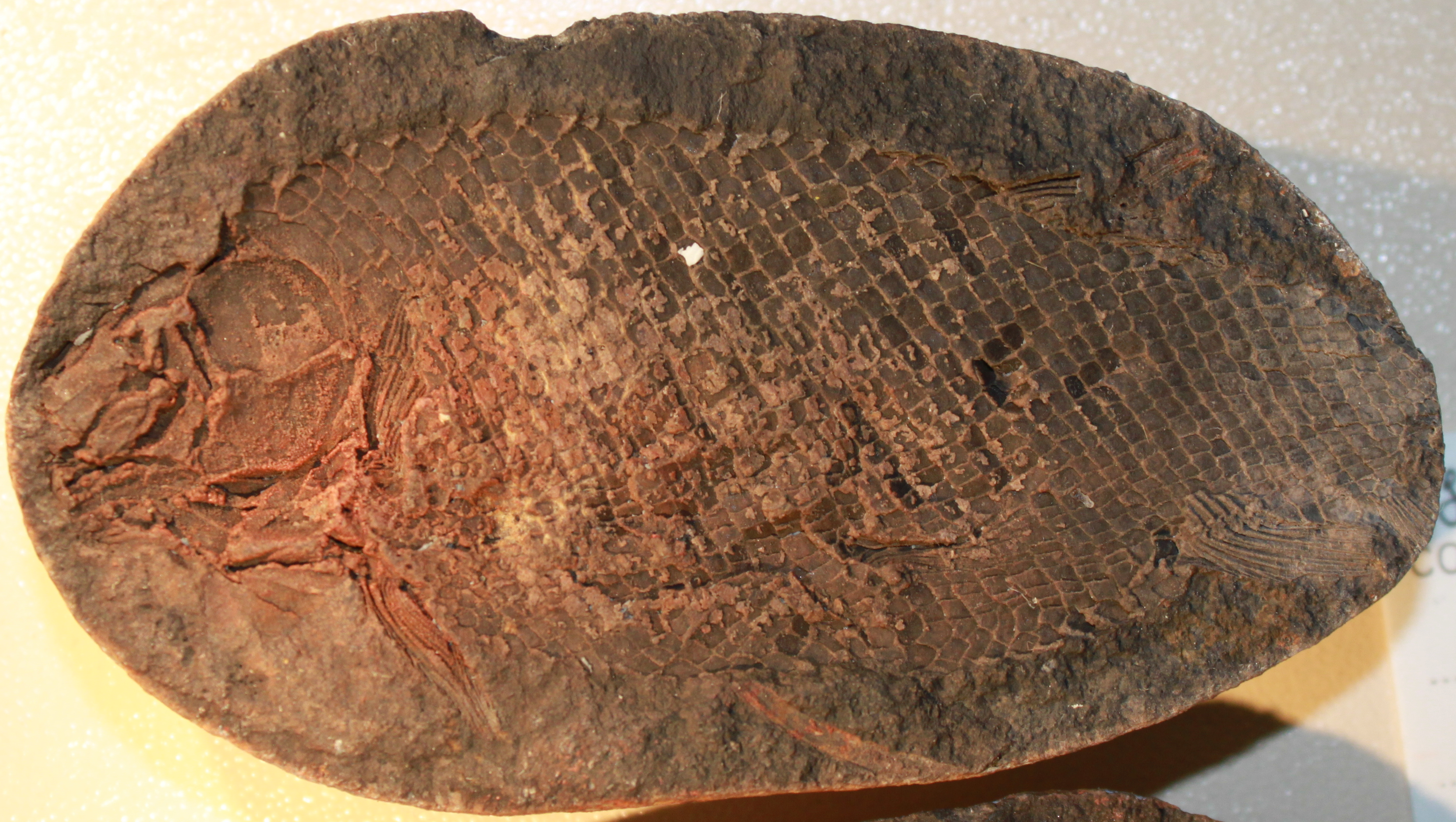
- Paracentrophorus madagascariensis fossil (type specimen)

Scientific classification
- Kingdom: Animalia
- Phylum: Chordata
- Class: Actinopterygii
- Order: †Semionotiformes?
- Family: †Semionotidae?
- Genus: †Paracentrophorus Piveteau, 1940

Binomial name
- †P. madagascariensis Piveteau, 1940

= Paracentrophorus =

Paracentrophorus Temporal range: Induan

Extinct genus of fishes

Paracentrophorus is an extinct genus of prehistoric ray-finned fish that lived during the Induan age of the Early Triassic epoch in what is now Madagascar. The type species is Paracentrophorus madagascariensis (monotypy).

Paracentrophorus is classified as a neopterygian. According to Jean Piveteau, it belongs to Semionotidae.

== See also ==
- Prehistoric fish
- List of prehistoric bony fish
