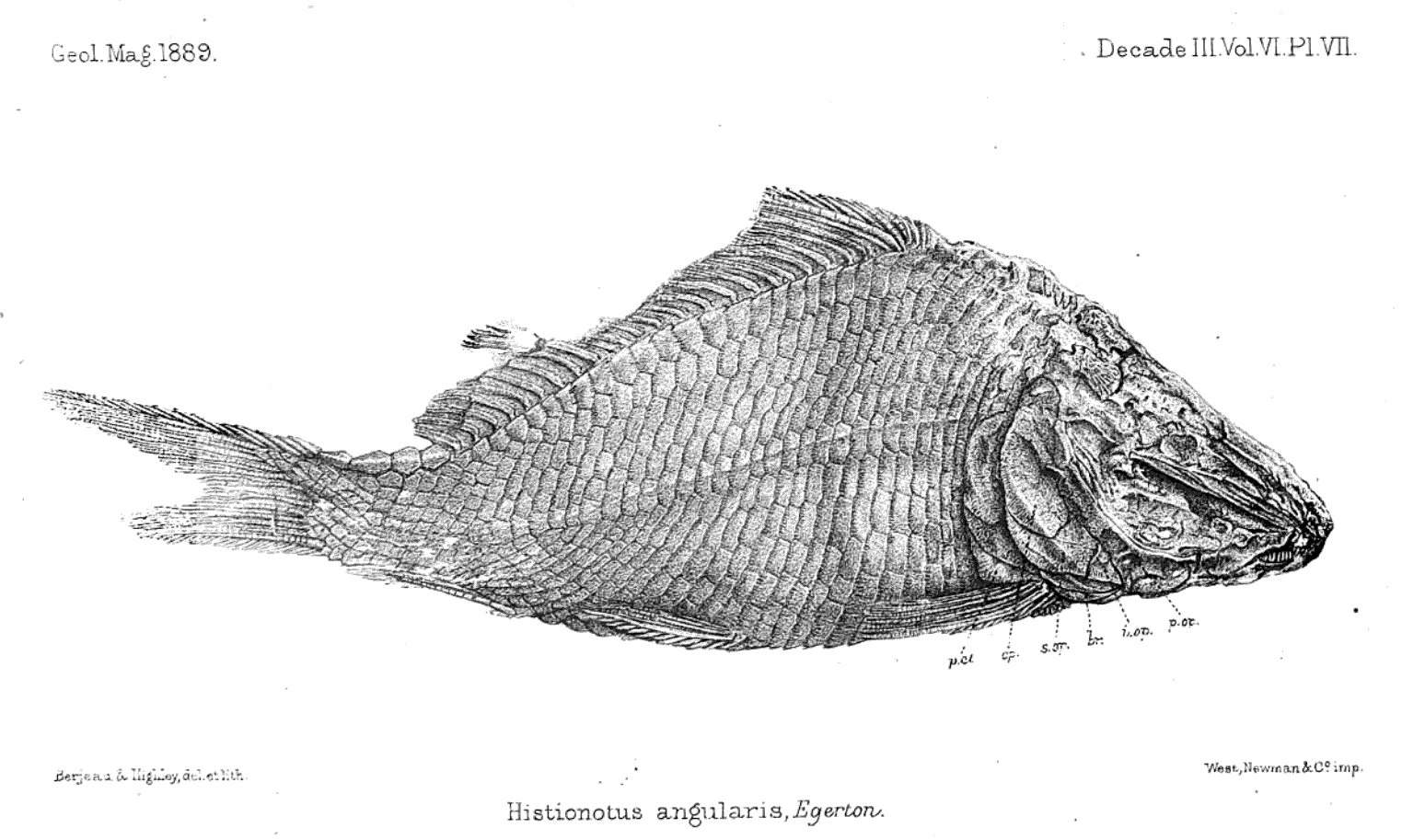
- Specimen of H. angularis

Scientific classification
- Kingdom: Animalia
- Phylum: Chordata
- Class: Actinopterygii
- Clade: Ginglymodi
- Order: †Semionotiformes
- Family: †Macrosemiidae
- Genus: †Histionotus; Egerton, 1854
- Species: †H. angularis

Binomial name
- †Histionotus angularis Egerton, 1854

= Histionotus =

Histionotus Temporal range: Berriasian

Extinct genus of fishes

Histionotus is an extinct genus of marine ginglymodian ray-finned fish from the Early Cretaceous of Europe. It contains a single species. H. angularis from the earliest Cretaceous (Berriasian)-aged Purbeck Formation of England.

Two other Late Jurassic species formerly placed within this genus, H. falsani Thiollière, 1873 from the Cerin Lagerstätte of France, and H. oberndorferi Wagner, 1863 from the Solnhofen Limestone of Germany, have been more recently found to be synonymous with one another and likely represent adult forms of the co-occurring fish Propterus microstomus. Propterus appears to be very closely related to Histionotus, and it pending further research, it is possible that H. angularis may also belong to Propterus, which would necessitate synonymizing the whole genus with Propterus.

== See also ==
- Prehistoric fish
- List of prehistoric bony fish
