= Corunegenys =

Corunegenys Temporal range: Late Triassic

Scientific classification
- Kingdom: Animalia
- Phylum: Chordata
- Class: Actinopterygii
- Clade: Ginglymodi
- Order: †Semionotiformes
- Genus: †Corunegenys; Wade, 1942
- Species: †C. bowralensis

Binomial name
- †Corunegenys bowralensis Wade, 1942

Extinct genus of fishes

Corunegenys is an extinct genus of prehistoric freshwater ray-finned fish that lived during the Late Triassic epoch near what is now Bowral in New South Wales, Australia. It contains a single species, C. bowralensis. Some studies suggest that it may be related to Semionotus capensis.

== See also ==
- Prehistoric fish
- List of prehistoric bony fish
