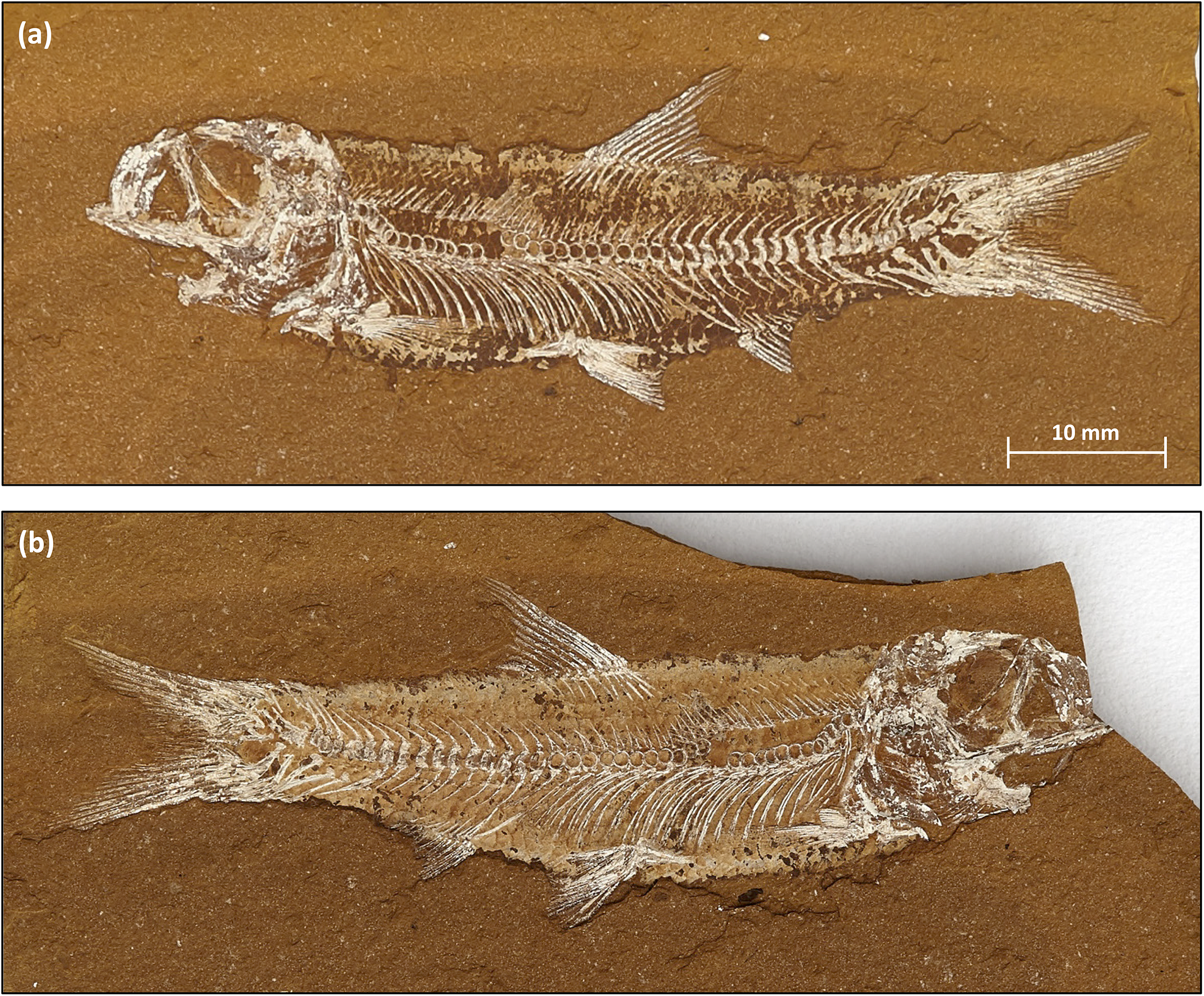

Scientific classification
- Kingdom: Animalia
- Phylum: Chordata
- Class: Actinopterygii
- Family: †Orthogonikleithridae
- Genus: †Cavenderichthys; Arratia, 1997
- Species: †C. talbragarensis

Binomial name
- †Cavenderichthys talbragarensis (Woodward, 1895)

Synonyms
- Leptolepis talbragarensis

= Cavenderichthys =

Cavenderichthys Temporal range: Tithonian, ~151 Ma

Extinct genus of fishes

Cavenderichthys is an extinct genus of prehistoric freshwater ray-finned fish from the Late Jurassic. It contains a single species, C. talbragarensis from the Talbragar Fish beds of New South Wales, Australia.

Initially considered a basal teleost of uncertain taxonomic identity, it was then placed in the family Luisiellidae, and later as a member of Orthogonikleithridae, alongside Leptolepides, Orthogonikleithrus and Waldmanichthys.

Fossil remains of Cavenderichthys are common in the Talbragar beds, including both full-body fossils and otoliths. Fossil otoliths are found associated with body fossils, isolated on their own, and even preserved within the coprolites of other taxa, suggesting it was an ecologically important genus.

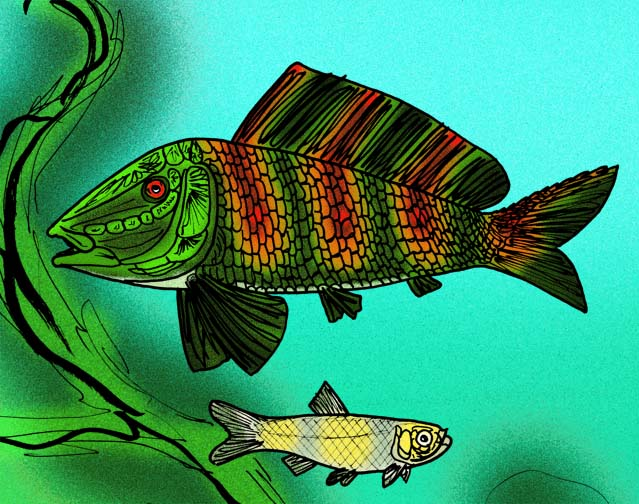
Life restoration of Cavenderichthys (bottom) with Uarbryichthys (top)
