= Operculum (animal) =

Anatomical structure of animals

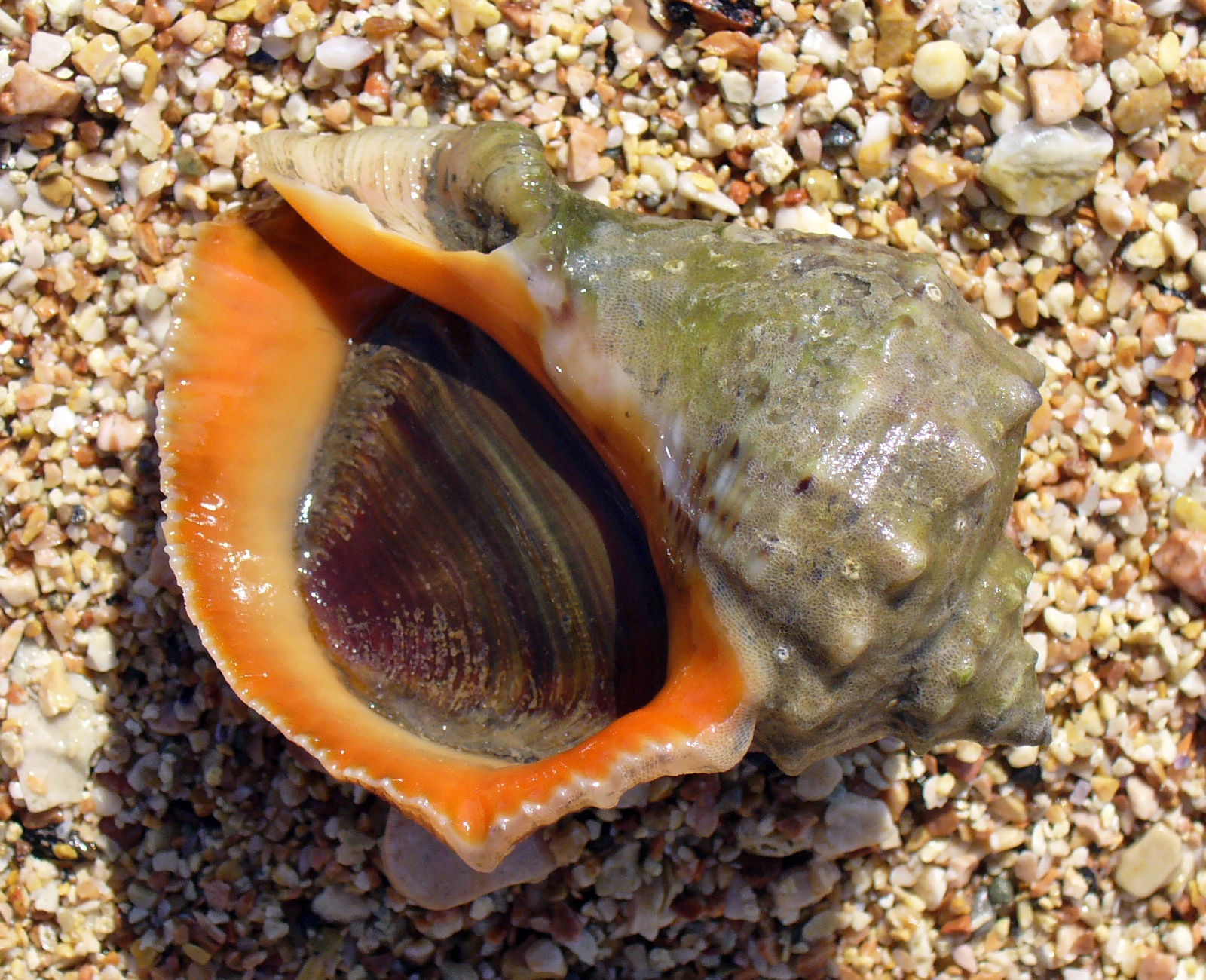
A live individual of the sea snail Rapana venosa retracted into the shell, with the operculum closing the aperture

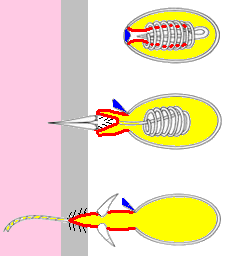
Firing sequence of the cnida in a hydra's nematocyst Operculum (lid) "Finger" that turns inside out / / / Barbs Venom Victim's skin Victim's tissues

An operculum is an anatomical feature, a stiff structure resembling a lid or a small door that opens and closes, and thus controls contact between the outside world and an internal part of an animal. Examples include:

- An operculum (gastropod), a single lid that (in its most complete form) closes the aperture of the shell when the animal is retracted, and thus protects the internal soft parts of the animal that are not completely covered by the shell. The operculum lies on the top rear part of the foot. When the foot is retracted, the operculum is rotated 180° and closes the shell.
- An operculum (fish), a flap that covers the gills in bony fishes and chimaeras.
- The cover that rapidly opens a cnida of a cnidarian such as a jellyfish or a sea anemone. The lid may be a single hinged flap or three hinged flaps arranged like slices of pie.
- In insects, the operculum is the name for one or more lids covering the tympanal cavity. A subgenital operculum is exhibited in stick insects and grasshoppers and allies (orthoptera). An operculum also covers the eggs of stick insects and other insects.

== See also ==
- Aptychus: A structure in ammonites which usually consists of two plates, and which was long thought to be a form of double operculum, but which more recently has been proposed to have been a jaw mechanism.
