= Aptychus =

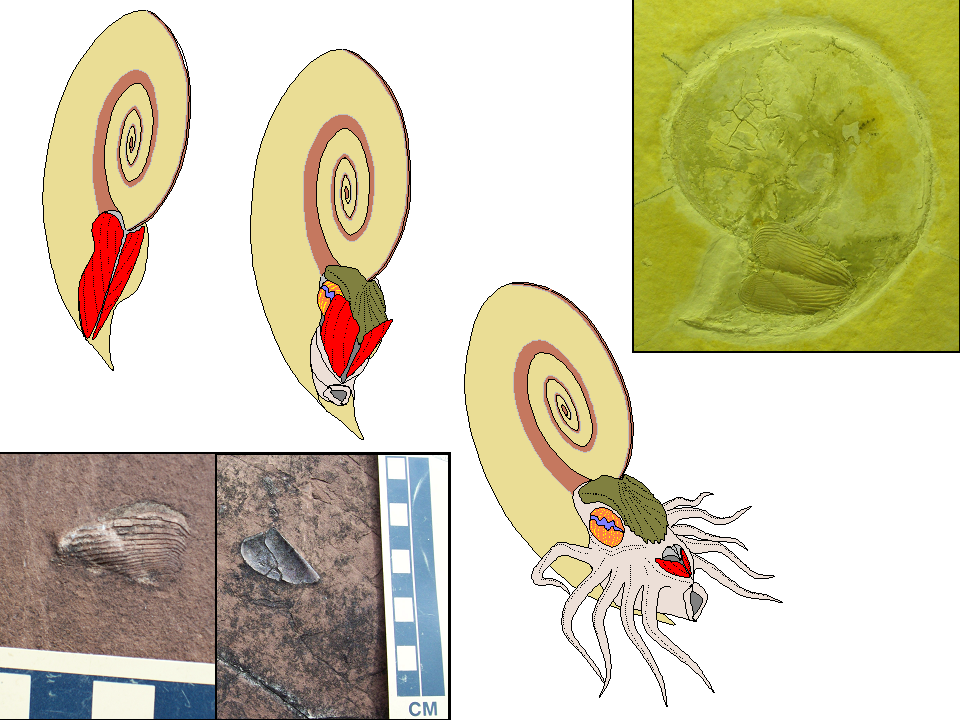
Some examples of aptychi (top right: Oppelia from Late Jurassic of Solnhofen, Germany; bottom left: aptychi (recto and versus) from Late Jurassic of Lombardy, Italy), and conceptual scheme of their function if indeed they were used to close the shell aperture, as opposed to being jaws.

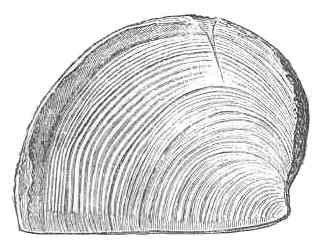
One of what would have been a pair of aptychi (at first given the name Trigonellites latus and described as a bivalve) from the Kimmeridge Clay Formation in England

An aptychus is a type of marine fossil. It is a hard anatomical structure, a sort of curved shelly plate, now understood to be part of the body of an ammonite. Paired aptychi have, on rare occasions, been found at or within the aperture of ammonite shells. The aptychus was usually composed of calcite, whereas the ammonite shell was aragonite.

Aptychi can be found well-preserved as fossils but usually quite separate from ammonite shells. This circumstance led to them being initially classified as valves of bivalves (clams), which they do somewhat resemble. Aptychi are found in rocks from the Devonian period through to those of the Cretaceous period.

There are many forms of aptychus, varying in shape and in the sculpture of the inner and outer surfaces. However, because they are so rarely found in position within the ammonite shell, it is often unclear which kind of aptychus belonged to which species of ammonite.

When only a single plate is present, as is sometimes the case, the term "anaptychus" is used.

== Function ==
Aptychi seem to have most often existed as bilaterally-symmetrical pairs and were first described (incorrectly) as being the valves of bivalve mollusks. Aptychi are now considered to be a two-valved closing hatch on the shells of extinct ammonites or a double-plate jaw-piece similar to that of some modern cephalopods.

Set near to or against the shell's terminal opening (the living chamber), the aptychi usually consisted of two identical but mirror image valves. Some authors consider the aptychus to be a jaw apparatus (mandibles), while others believe them to be paired opercula. If the latter is the case, then aptychi may have had a function similar to the head shield of modern nautiluses.

== Gallery ==
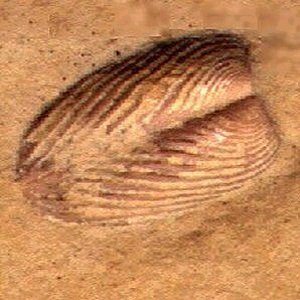
Pair of fossil aptychi (image is 1 cm across)

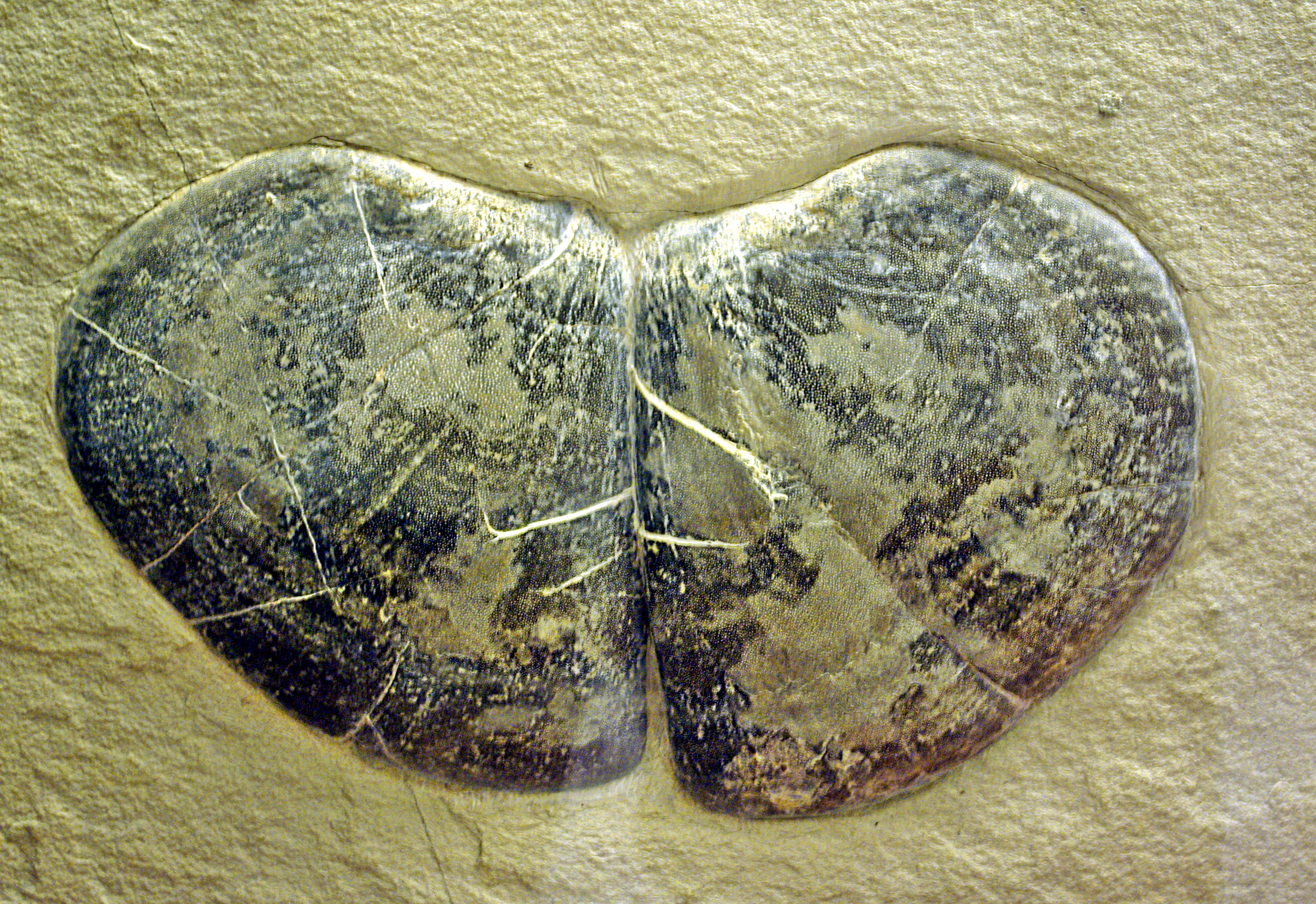
Fossil of Laevaptychus

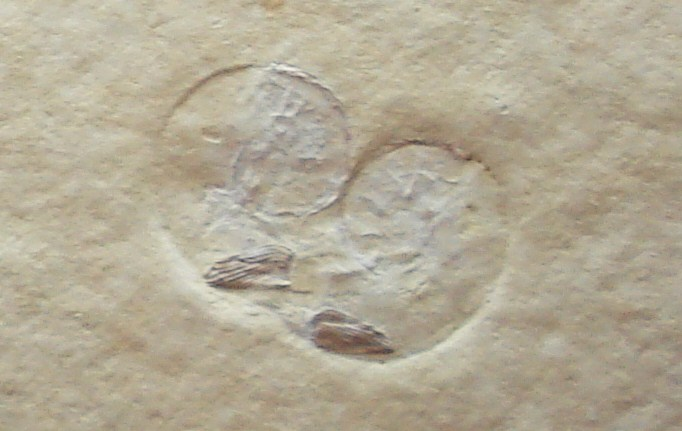
Pair of Lingulaticeras solenoides with aptychi in place

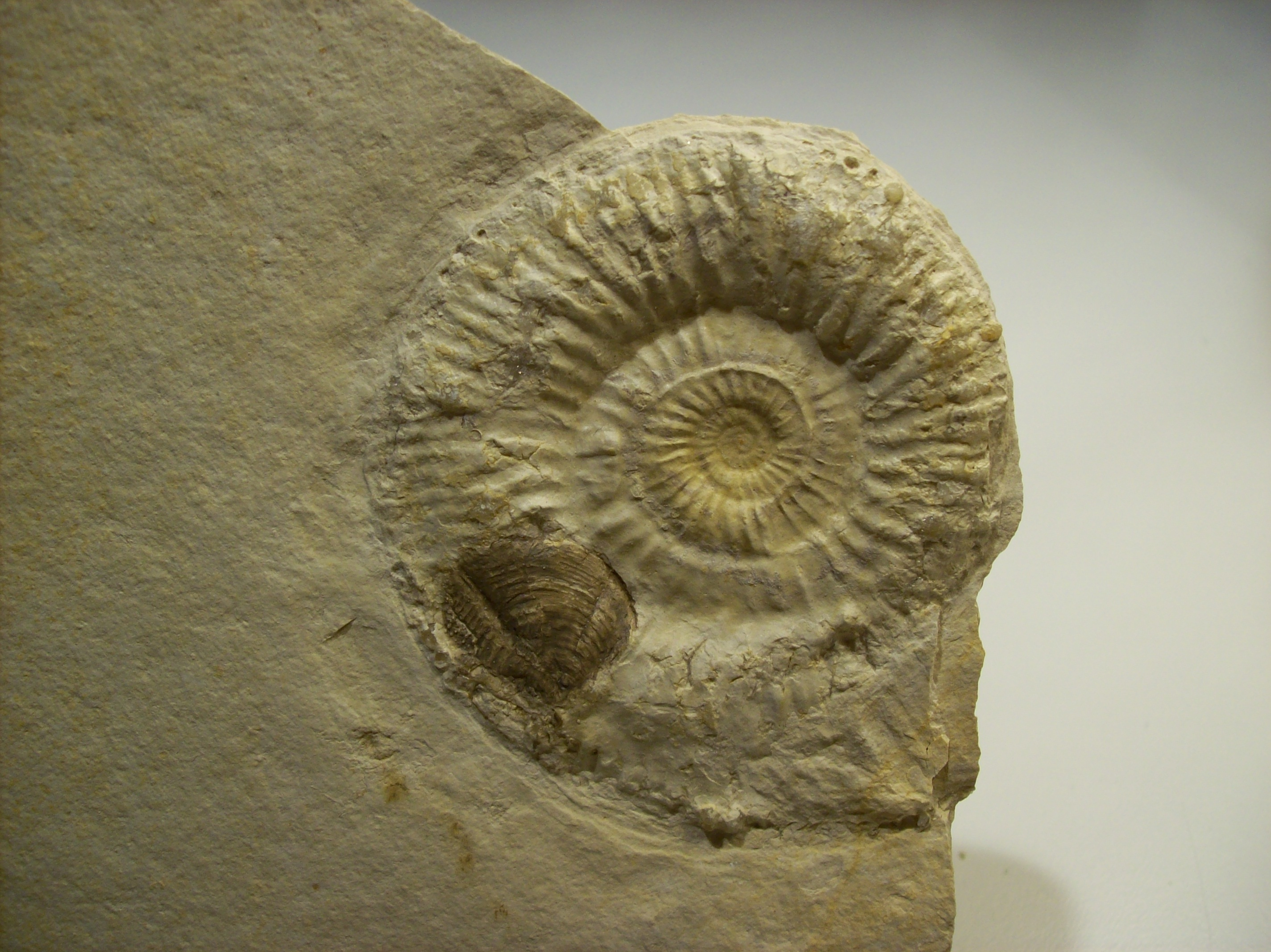
Perisphinctes with aptychi from the Solnhofen limestone
