= Aphelolepis =

Aphelolepis Temporal range: Ladinian

Scientific classification
- Domain: Eukaryota
- Kingdom: Animalia
- Phylum: Chordata
- Class: Actinopterygii
- Clade: Ginglymodi
- Order: †Semionotiformes
- Genus: †Aphelolepis; Heller, 1953
- Species: †A. delpi

Binomial name
- †Aphelolepis delpi Heller, 1953

Genus of fishes

Aphelolepis is an extinct genus of prehistoric ginglymodian bony fish. It contains one species, A. delpi, that lived during the Ladinian age of the Middle Triassic epoch in what is now Franconia, Germany. It is generally considered a semionotiform.

== See also ==
- Prehistoric fish
- List of prehistoric bony fish
