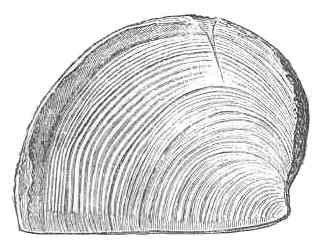
- 1895 drawing of an aptychi of T. latus

Scientific classification
- Domain: Eukaryota
- Kingdom: Animalia
- Phylum: Mollusca
- Class: Cephalopoda
- Subclass: †Ammonoidea
- Genus: †Trigonellites; Parkinson, 1811

Type species
- †Trigonellites latus Parkinson, 1811

Other species
- †T. curvirostris Schlotheim, 1836; †T. simplex? Schlotheim, 1863 vide Goldfuss, 1863

Synonyms
- Aptychus von Meyer, 1831; Lyrodon simplex? Schlotheim, 1863

= Trigonellites =

Trigonellites Temporal range: Late Jurassic, ~156–151 Ma

Genus of molluscs (fossil)

Trigonellites is an extinct genus of basal ammonite, known from two or three species, discovered in outcrops of the Late Jurassic-aged Kimmeridge Clay Formation in Ely and Cumnor, England and possibly also an unnamed Early Triassic-aged rock formation in Bindlach, Germany. It was originally classified as a bivalve, but it has since been classed as an ammonite species. Only two species once placed in the genus are still considered valid today: T. latus and T. curvirostris, with one dubious species, T. simplex, possibly being a species of Lyrodon.

The genus name Trigonellites was originally proposed for some calcareous plates found in Cretaceous oolitic rocks, but these have since been declassed as indeterminate ammonites as the name was never published. The name has since been used to represent two species of Late Jurassic (c.156-151 Ma) ammonites and one Early Triassic (c.242.7 Ma) species.
