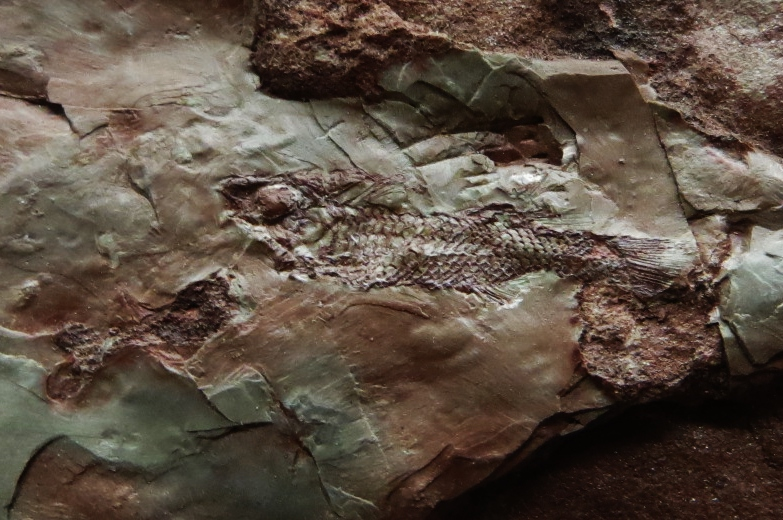
- Pericentrophorus minimus fossil

Scientific classification
- Domain: Eukaryota
- Kingdom: Animalia
- Phylum: Chordata
- Class: Actinopterygii
- Clade: Ginglymodi
- Order: †Semionotiformes
- Genus: †Pericentrophorus; Jörg, 1969
- Species: †P. minimus

Binomial name
- †Pericentrophorus minimus Jörg, 1969

= Pericentrophorus =

Pericentrophorus Temporal range: early Anisian

Extinct genus of fishes

Pericentrophorus is an extinct genus of prehistoric bony fish that lived during the early Anisian age of the Middle Triassic epoch in what is now Alsace, France, and Baden-Württemberg, Germany. The type and only species is Pericentrophorus minimus.

== See also ==
- Prehistoric fish
- List of prehistoric bony fish
