= Alleiolepis =

Alleiolepis Temporal range: Ladinian

Scientific classification
- Domain: Eukaryota
- Kingdom: Animalia
- Phylum: Chordata
- Class: Actinopterygii
- Clade: Ginglymodi
- Order: †Semionotiformes
- Genus: †Alleiolepis; Heller, 1953
- Species: †A. kohlmanni

Binomial name
- †Alleiolepis kohlmanni (Heller, 1952)

Synonyms
- Leiolepis Heller, 1952 (non Leiolepis Cuvier, 1829)

Extinct genus of fishes

Alleiolepis is an extinct genus of prehistoric bony fish, which lived during the Ladinian age of the Middle Triassic epoch in what is now Franconia, Germany. It is generally considered a semionotiform. It was first named Leiolepis, but because this genus name is preoccupied by an extant lizard, the genus name of the Triassic fish was changed to Aleiolepis.

== See also ==
- Prehistoric fish
- List of prehistoric bony fish
