= Orthurus =

Orthurus Temporal range: Carnian

Scientific classification
- Kingdom: Animalia
- Phylum: Chordata
- Class: Actinopterygii
- Clade: Ginglymodi
- Order: †Semionotiformes
- Family: †Macrosemiidae
- Genus: †Orthurus; Kner, 1866

Extinct genus of fishes

Orthurus is an extinct genus of prehistoric bony fish that lived during the Carnian stage of the Late Triassic epoch.

== See also ==
- Prehistoric fish
- List of prehistoric bony fish genera
