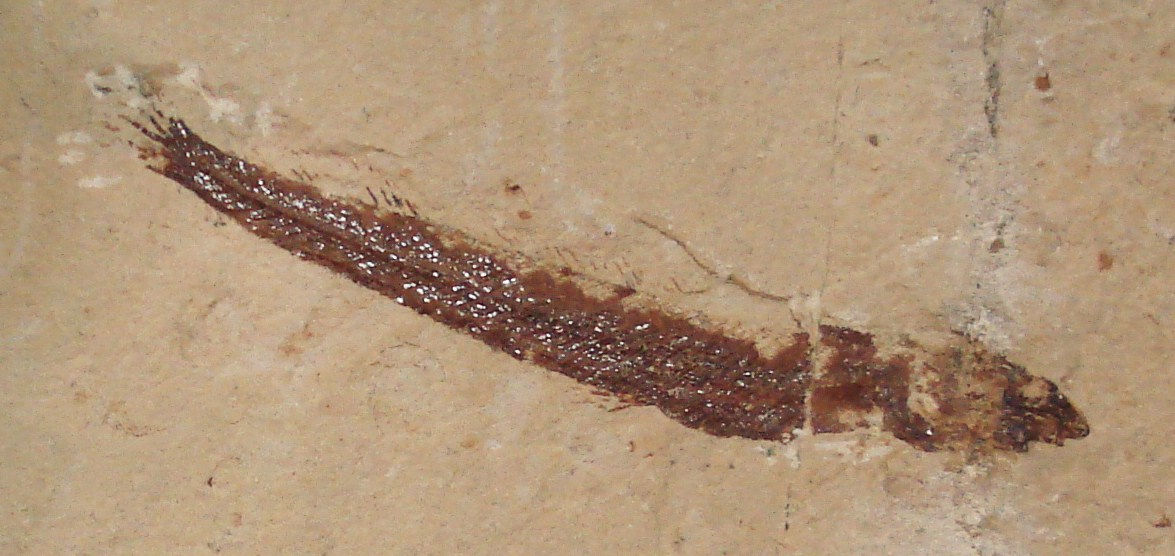
- A. dorsalis

Scientific classification
- Kingdom: Animalia
- Phylum: Chordata
- Class: Actinopterygii
- Clade: Ginglymodi
- Order: †Macrosemiiformes (?)
- Genus: †Aphanepygus; Bassani, 1879

Species
- A. dorsalis Davis, 1887; A. elegans Bassani, 1879

= Aphanepygus =

Aphanepygus Temporal range: Upper Cenomanian

Extinct genus of fishes

Aphanepygus is an extinct genus of prehistoric marine holostean ray-finned fish that lived during the upper Cenomanian. It inhabited the former Tethys Ocean, with remains known from Lebanon and Croatia. Its exact affinities are uncertain, although it is usually recovered as a relative of the macrosemiids. However, other authorities recover it in the Ionoscopiformes.

The following species are known:

- A. dorsalis Davis, 1887 (Cenomanian of Lebanon)
- A. elegans Bassani, 1879 (Cenomanian of Croatia)

== See also ==
- Prehistoric fish
- List of prehistoric bony fish
