= Francesco Bassani =

Italian geologist and paleontologist (1853–1916)

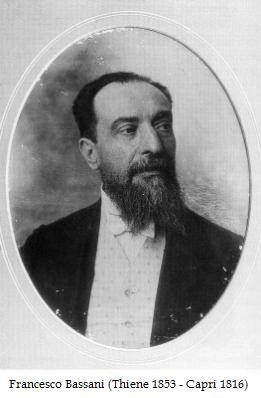

Francesco Bassani (29 October 1853 – 26 April 1916) was an Italian geologist and paleontologist among the first to identify ichthyosaur fossils from northern Italy.

Bassani was born in Thiene, studied at Vicenza and graduated from the University of Padua where he studied under Giovanni Omboni. He also studied in Paris under Albert Gaudry, Melchior Neumayr and Edward Suess in Vienna and Karl Alfred von Zittel in Munich between 1877 and 1879. He worked in Padua for a while, then moved to Milan in 1883 and collaborated with Antonio Stoppani between 1882 and 1885. He became a director of the institute of geology in Naples in 1887 and worked there until his death. He described numerous fossils from Italian localities including an ichthyosaur from Besano. He described fossil fish from Chiavon with illustrations made by his Dutch-origin wife Everdina Douwes Dekker who he married in 1880. A mineral from Vesuvius was named after him as bassanite in 1906. He died at Capri.
