= Pholidophoristion =

Pholidophoristion Temporal range: Late Jurassic–Early Cretaceous

Scientific classification
- Domain: Eukaryota
- Kingdom: Animalia
- Phylum: Chordata
- Class: Actinopterygii
- Order: †Ankylophoriformes
- Family: †Ankylophoridae
- Genus: †Pholidophoristion; Woodward, 1941

Species
- †P. micronyx (Agassiz, 1844); †P. ornatus (Agassiz, 1844); †P. ovatus (Wagner, 1860); †P. spaethi (Taverne, 1981)

Extinct genus of ray-finned fishes

Pholidophoristion is an extinct genus of stem-teleost ray-finned fish that lived in what is now Europe from the Late Jurassic to the Early Cretaceous.
