= Euposauridae =

Euposauridae Temporal range: Late Jurassic

Scientific classification
- Domain: Eukaryota
- Kingdom: Animalia
- Phylum: Chordata
- Class: Reptilia
- Order: Squamata
- Genus: †Euposauridae

Extinct family of lizards

Euposauridae was a family of lizards from the Jurassic of Europe. They were small to medium-sized.
