= Sinosemionotus =

Sinosemionotus Temporal range: Middle Triassic

Scientific classification
- Domain: Eukaryota
- Kingdom: Animalia
- Phylum: Chordata
- Class: Actinopterygii
- Genus: †Sinosemionotus; Yuan and Koh, 1936

Extinct genus of fishes

Sinosemionotus is an extinct genus of prehistoric bony fish that lived during the Middle Triassic epoch.

== See also ==
- Prehistoric fish
- List of prehistoric bony fish
