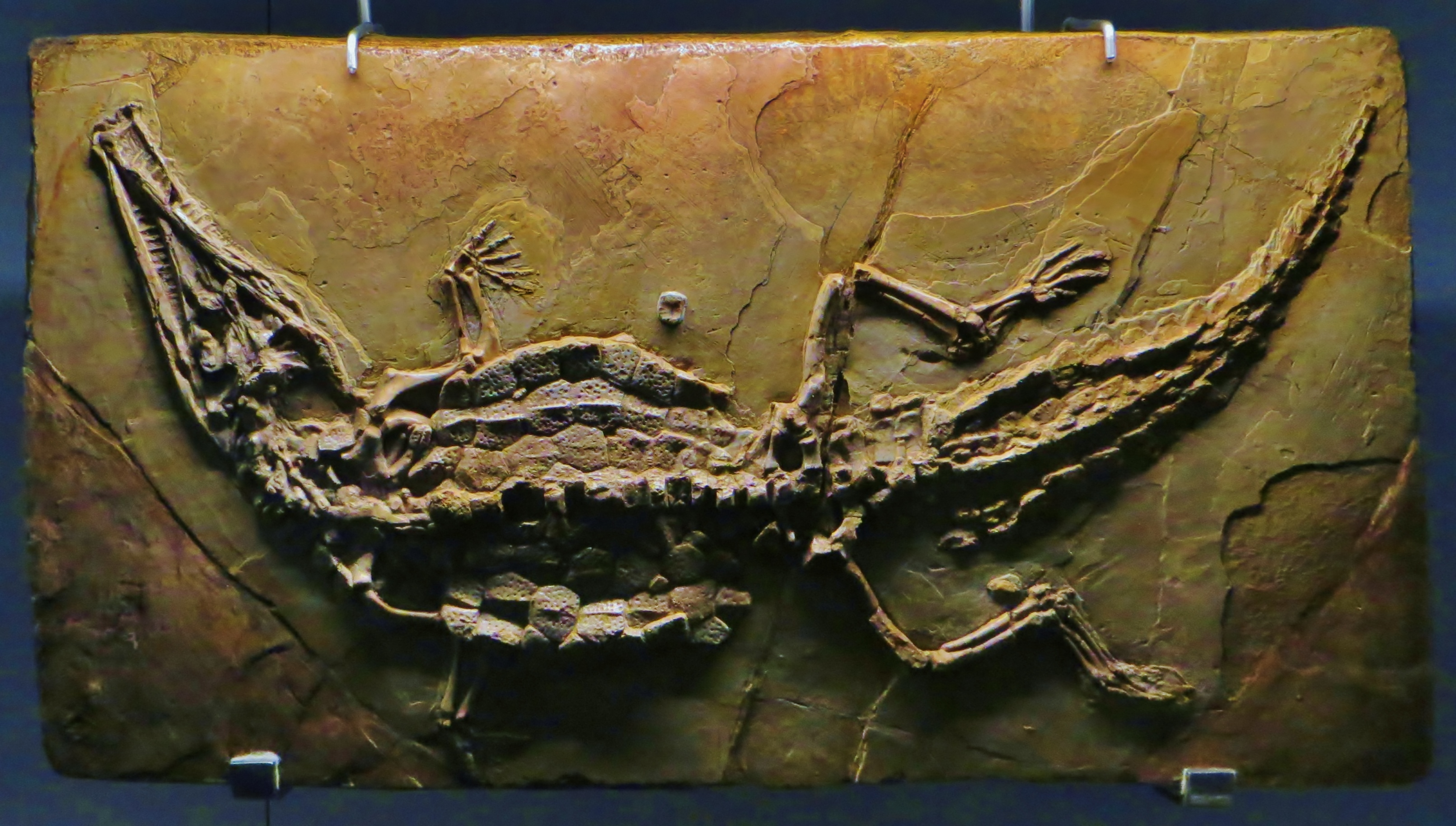
- Fossil C. robustus

Scientific classification
- Kingdom: Animalia
- Phylum: Chordata
- Class: Reptilia
- Clade: Pseudosuchia
- Clade: Crocodylomorpha
- Clade: Neosuchia
- Suborder: †Tethysuchia
- Family: †Pholidosauridae
- Genus: †Crocodilaemus; Jourdan, 1857

Type species
- †C. robustus Jourdan, 1857

= Crocodilaemus =

Crocodilaemus Temporal range: Late Jurassic

Extinct genus of reptiles

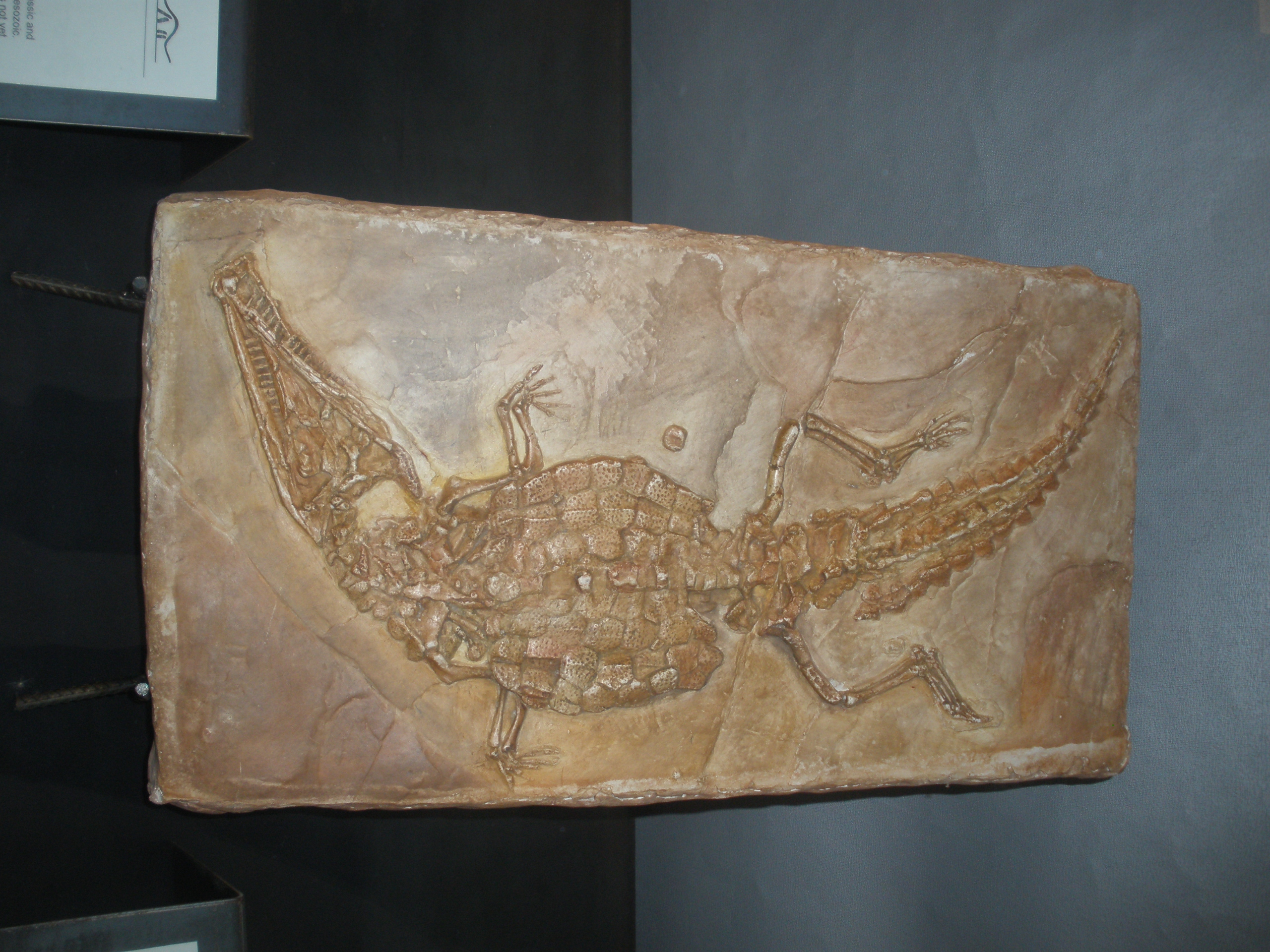
Crocodilaemus robustus

Crocodilaemus is an extinct genus of pholidosaurid mesoeucrocodylian. Fossils have been found from the Cerin Lagerstätte of eastern France and are of late Kimmeridgian age. The depositional environment in Cerin at the time is thought to have been the bottom of a lagoon that was enclosed by an emergent reef complex, evidence of the shallow tropical sea that covered much of western Europe during the Jurassic period.
