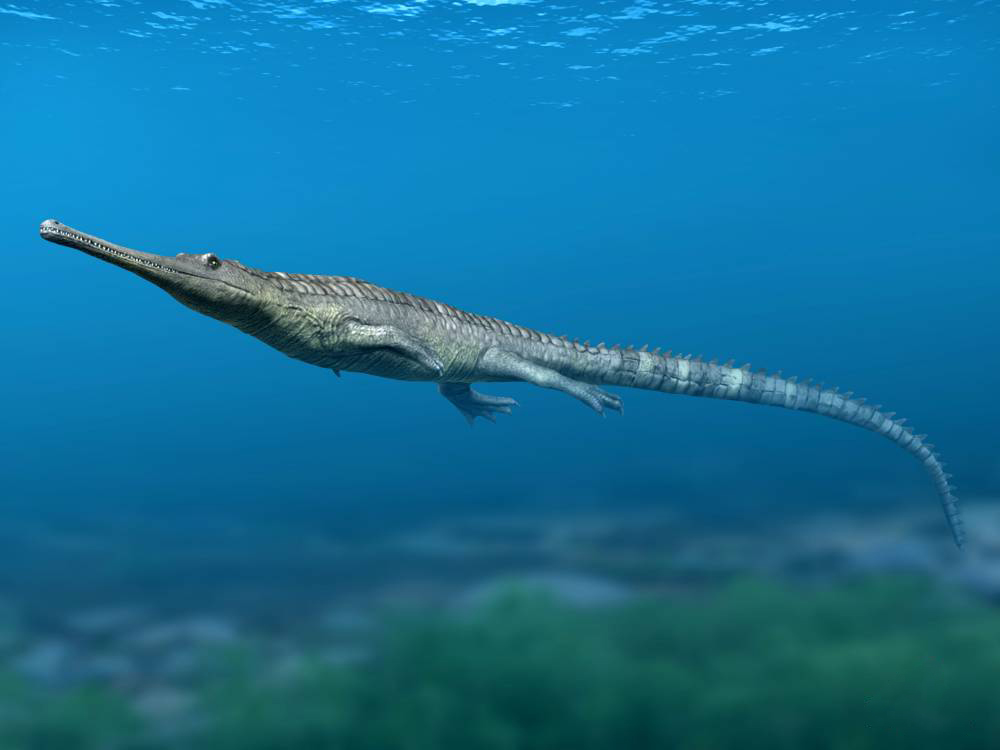
- Hypothetical life reconstruction of Gavialinum rhodani

Scientific classification
- Domain: Eukaryota
- Kingdom: Animalia
- Phylum: Chordata
- Class: Reptilia
- Clade: Archosauria
- Clade: Pseudosuchia
- Clade: Crocodylomorpha
- Clade: Crocodyliformes
- Suborder: †Thalattosuchia
- Family: †Teleosauridae
- Genus: †Gavialinum; Lortet, 1892

Type species
- †Gavialinum rhodani Lortet, 1892

= Gavialinum =

Gavialinum Temporal range: Middle Jurassic, Bathonian

Extinct genus of reptiles

Gavialinum is an extinct genus of teleosaurid thalattosuchian.

== Distribution ==
Fossils have been found in France that date back to the Bathonian stage of the Middle Jurassic.

== Description ==
Gavialinum rhodani has a long, narrow snout, much like the current gavialids, from which the Gavialinum genus gets its name. The two are not related, as Gavialinum rhodani occurred much earlier than any crocodilian. Gavialinum had 33 teeth on each jaw, for a total of 66.
