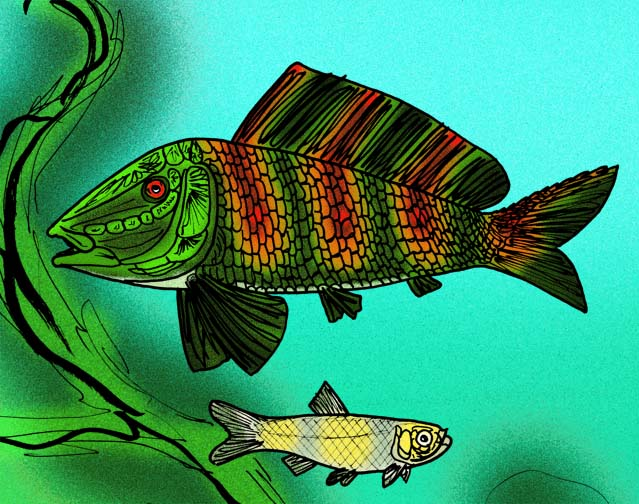
- Comparison of U. latus (top) and Cavenderichthys talbragarensis (bottom)

Scientific classification
- Kingdom: Animalia
- Phylum: Chordata
- Class: Actinopterygii
- Clade: Ginglymodi
- Order: †Macrosemiiformes
- Genus: †Uarbryichthys; Wade, 1941

Species
- U. latus (Wade, 1941); U. incertus (Wade, 1953)

= Uarbryichthys =

Uarbryichthys Temporal range: Upper Jurassic

Extinct genus of fishes

Uarbryichthys is a genus of primitive ginglymodian ray-finned fish from fossil beds near the Talbragar River Bed. The various species were lake-dwelling fish that lived during the Upper Jurassic of Australia, and are closely related to the macrosemiids. The living animal would have had a superficial resemblance to a very small porgie, scup, or sea bream, but with a heterocercal tail fin.
