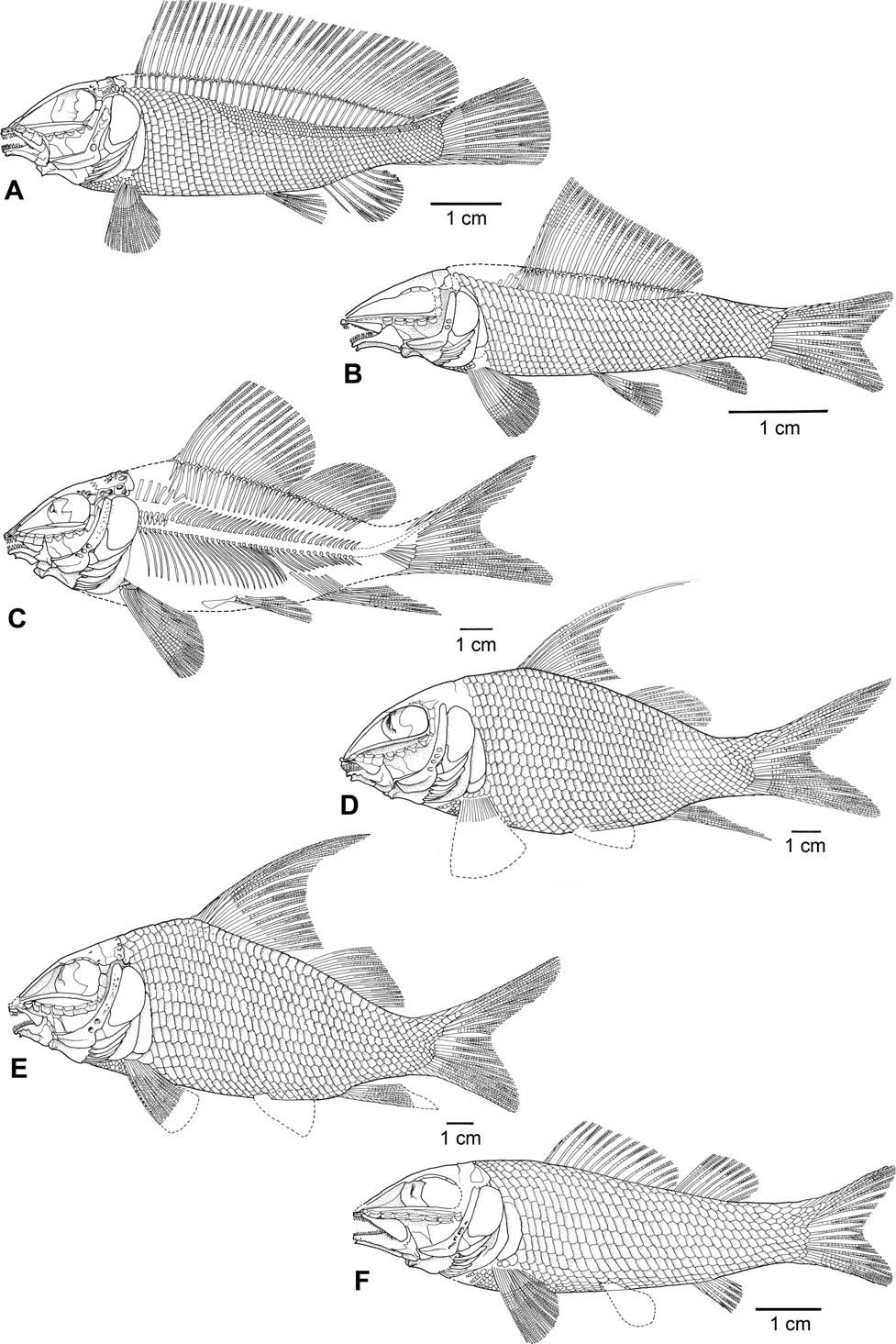
- Various Macrosemiiform fishes, from top to bottom A. Macrosemius rostratus (Germany, Late Jurassic) B. Legnonotus krambergeri (Austria, Late Triassic) C. Propterus elongatus (Germany, Late Jurassic) D. Propterus microstomus (Germany, Late Jurassic)E. Histionotus oberndorferi (Germany, Late Jurassic) F. Notagogus denticulatus (Germany, Late Jurassic)

Scientific classification
- Kingdom: Animalia
- Phylum: Chordata
- Class: Actinopterygii
- Clade: Ginglymodi
- Clade: Neoginglymodi
- Order: †Semionotiformes
- Family: †Macrosemiidae; Thiollière, 1858

Genera
- See text

Synonyms
- Macrosemiiformes Carroll, 1988

= Macrosemiidae =

Macrosemiidae Temporal range: Late Triassic–Maastrichtian

Extinct order of fishes

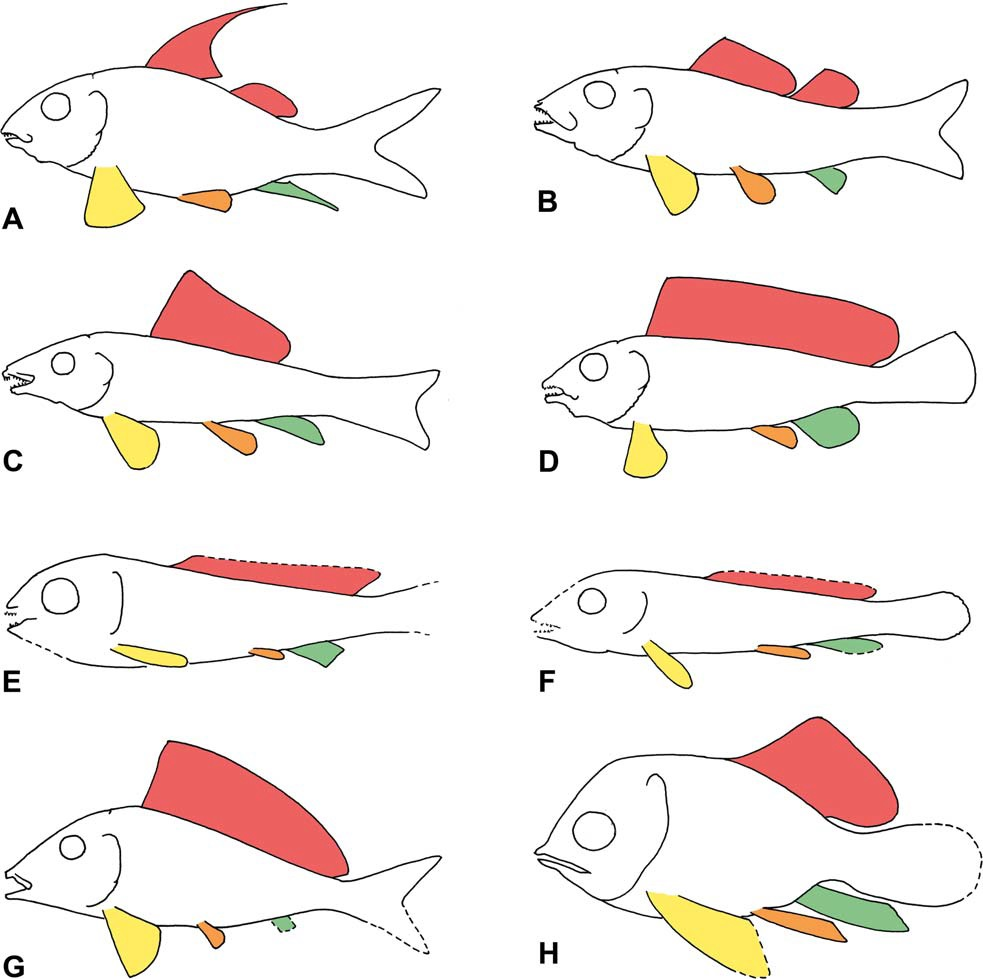
Fin shape diversity within Macrosemiiformes A. Propterus microstomus; B. Notagogus denticulatus; C. Legnonotus krambergeri; D. Macrosemius rostratus; E. Enchelyolepis andrewsi F. Enchelyolepis pectoralis G. Uarbryichthys latus H. Voelklichthys comitatus. Pectoral fins are shown in yellow; pelvic fins in orange; dorsal fins in red; and anal fins in green.

Macrosemiidae is an extinct family of ginglymodian fish. The family first appeared during the Middle Triassic and disappeared during the Late Cretaceous. The group has been found in rock formations in Africa, Australia, Eurasia and North America. As ginglymodians, their closest living relatives are gars, with them being typically placed as nested within the Semionotiformes. Many members of the family have elongated dorsal fins, often associated with adjacent area of skin which was free of scales. These fins were likely undulated for use in precision swimming. Their body morphology suggests that they were slow swimmers that were capable of maneuvering around complex topography, such as reef environments.

== Taxonomy ==
- †Order Macrosemiiformes
  - †Family Macrosemiidae, Thiollière, 1858
    - Genus †Eosemionotus
    - Genus †Agoultichthys
    - Genus †Aphanepygus
    - Genus †Disticholepis
    - Genus †Enchelyolepis
    - Genus †Orthurus
    - Genus †Petalopteryx
    - Genus †Neonotagogus
    - Genus †Histionotus
    - Genus †Legnonotus
    - Genus †Macrosemius
    - Genus †Propterus
  - Incetae sedis
    - Genus †Uarbryichthys
    - Genus †Voelklichthys
