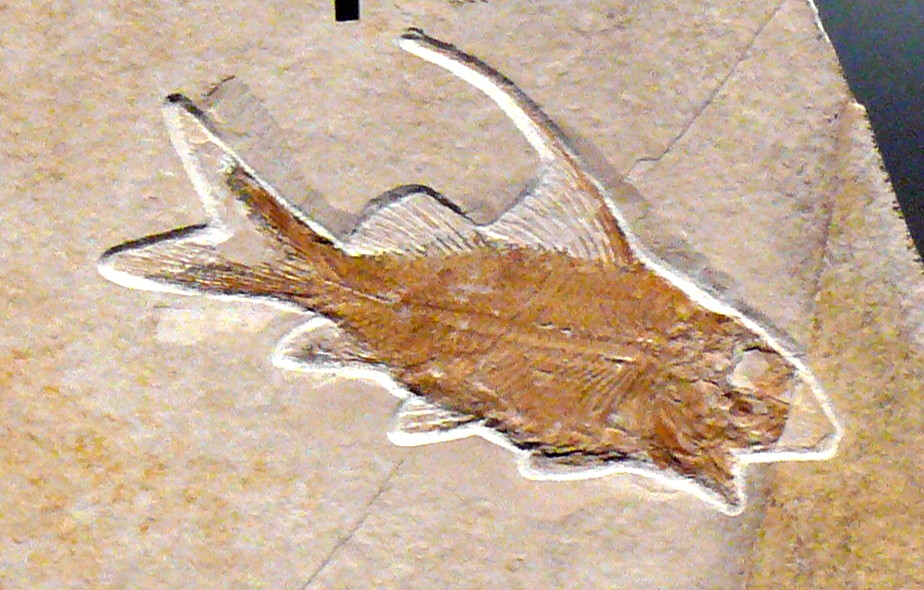
- Propterus microstomus

Scientific classification
- Kingdom: Animalia
- Phylum: Chordata
- Class: Actinopterygii
- Clade: Ginglymodi
- Order: †Semionotiformes
- Family: †Macrosemiidae
- Genus: †Propterus; Agassiz, 1834

= Propterus =

Propterus Temporal range: Tithonian

Extinct genus of fishes

Propterus is an extinct genus of prehistoric ray-finned fish of the Solnhofen Plattenkalk.

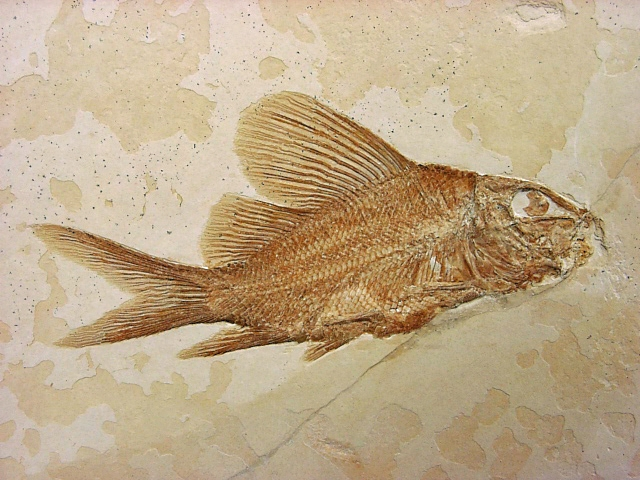
†Propterus elongatus Wagner 1863 from the Jurassic of Solnhofen, Germany

== See also ==
- Prehistoric fish
- List of prehistoric bony fish
