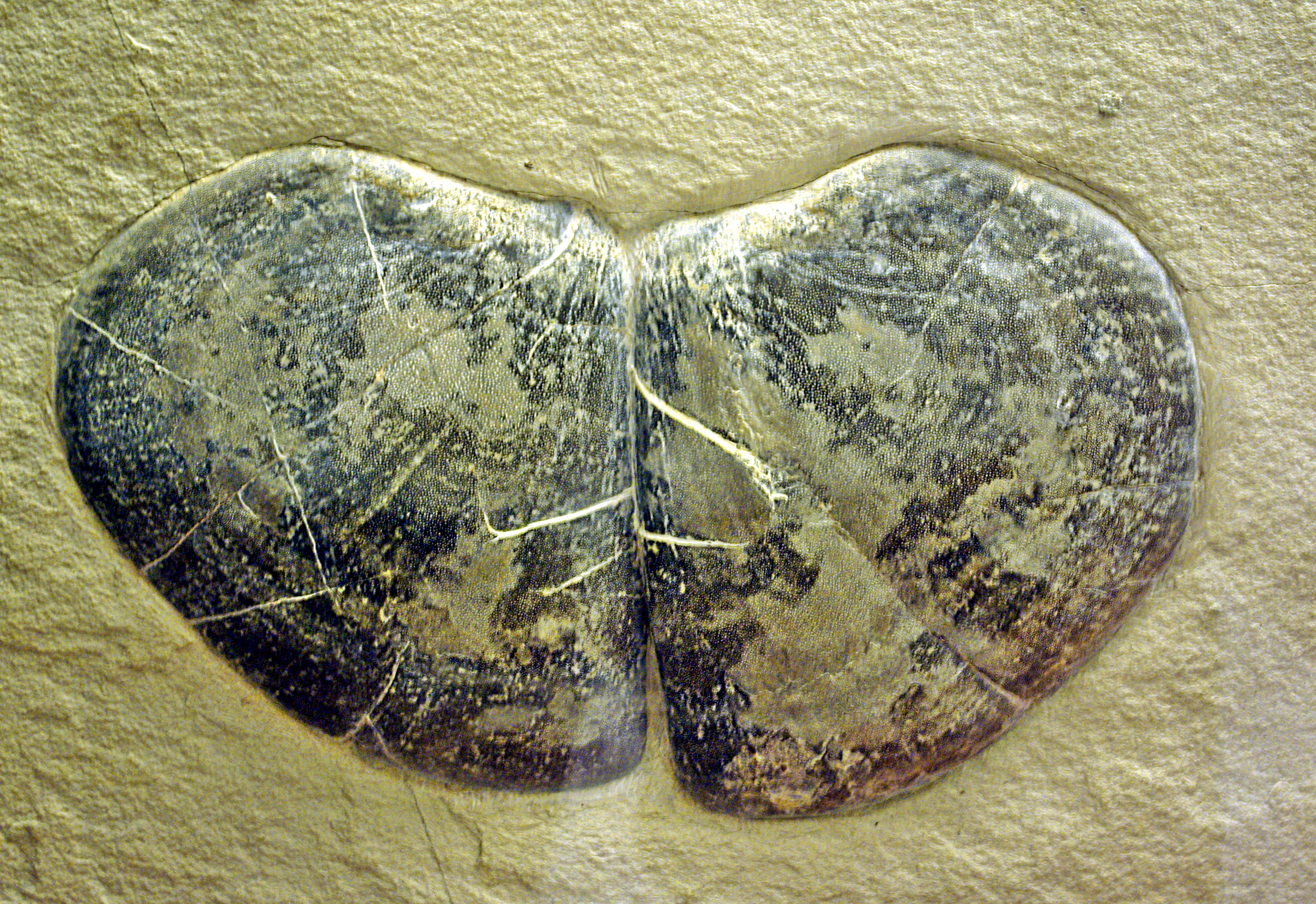
- Laevaptychus Fossil

Scientific classification
- Kingdom: Animalia
- Phylum: Mollusca
- Class: Cephalopoda
- Order: Ammonitida
- Genus: Laevaptychus Trauth, 1927

= Laevaptychus =

Laevaptychus Temporal range: Triassic–Upper Jurassic

Genus of molluscs (fossil)

Laevapetchyus is a genus of ammonites.

In Europe, most representatives of the genus Laevaptychus occur by the end of the early Tithonian. Laevaptychus latus is common throughout the Upper Jurassic and is abundant in the Alpine-Mediterranean region.

It is also recorded in southern Arabia, Tunisia, Somalia and the western North Atlantic.

In Mexico, the first records of Aptychus latus (= Laevaptychus latus) are provided from the Upper Jurassic of the La Caja Formation at Sierra de Catorce, San Luis Potosí and from the upper Kimmeridgian "Couche à Haploceras d. gr. Fialar" of Sierra de Santa Rosa, Mazapil, Zacatecas.
