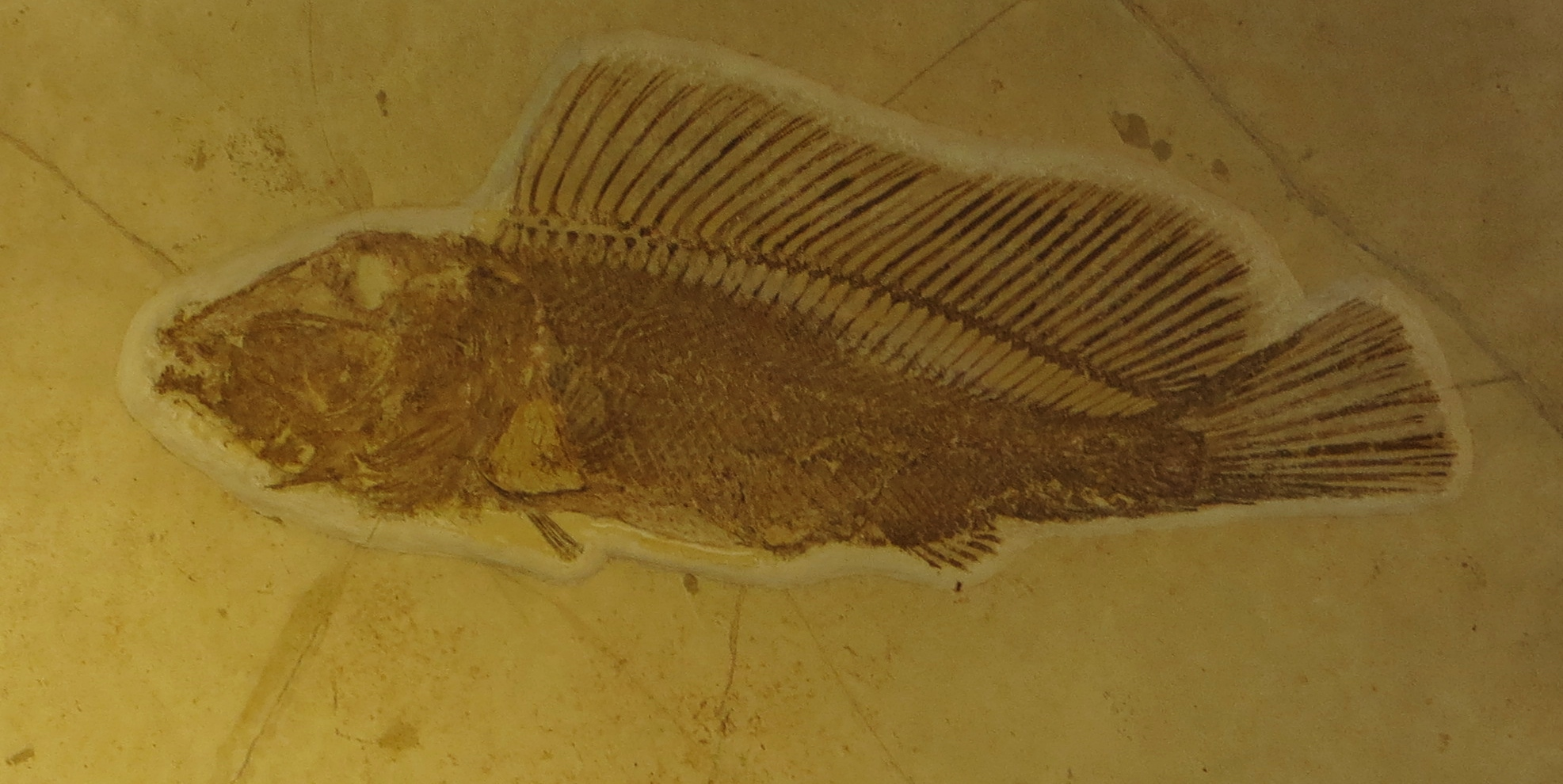
- Macrosemius rostratus fossil

Scientific classification
- Kingdom: Animalia
- Phylum: Chordata
- Class: Actinopterygii
- Clade: Ginglymodi
- Order: †Semionotiformes
- Family: †Macrosemiidae
- Genus: †Macrosemius; Agassiz, 1834

= Macrosemius =

Macrosemius Temporal range: Late Jurassic

Extinct genus of fishes

Macrosemius is an extinct genus of macrosemiid fish known from the Late Jurassic of Germany.

== See also ==
- Prehistoric fish
- List of prehistoric bony fish
