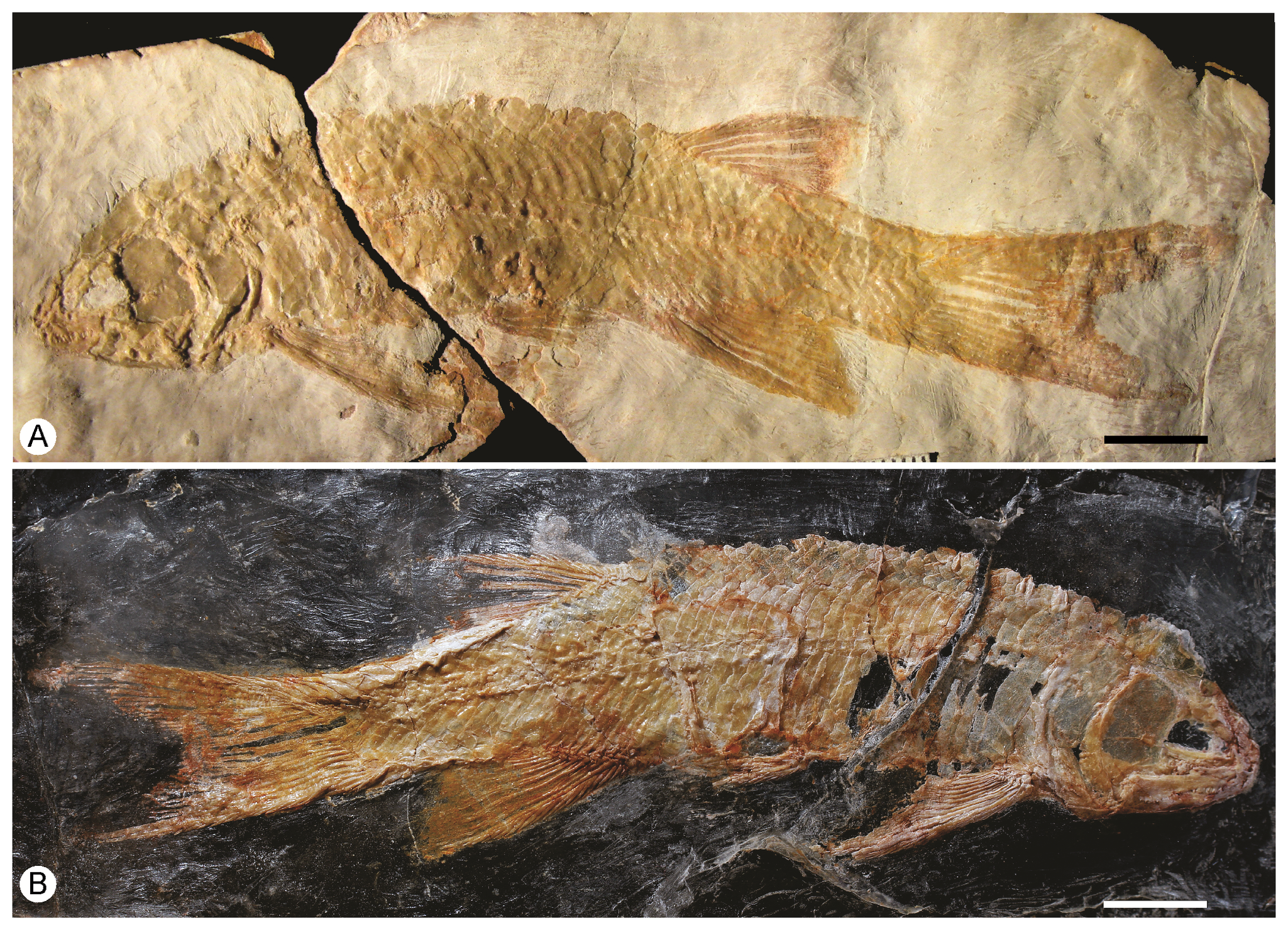
- C. scutatus (holotype)

Scientific classification
- Kingdom: Animalia
- Phylum: Chordata
- Class: Actinopterygii
- Clade: Halecomorphi
- Genus: †Cipactlichthys; Brito & Alvarado-Ortega, 2013
- Species: †C. scutatus

Binomial name
- †Cipactlichthys scutatus Brito & Alvarado-Ortega, 2013

= Cipactlichthys =

Cipactlichthys Temporal range: Late Albian

Extinct genus of ray-finned fishes

Cipactlichthys is a genus of extinct marine holostean fish from the Lower Cretaceous of Mexico, distantly related to modern bowfins. The only known species is Cipactlichthys scutatus.

== Discovery and etymology ==
Cipactlichthys scutatus is known from two fossils discovered in the Tlayua Formation near the town of Tepexi de Rodríguez, in Puebla, Mexico. The Tlayua Formation, is Albian (Early Cretaceous) in age, interpreted as an epicontinental marine deposit. Due to its high quality preservation and abundance of fish fossils, the formation is considered one of the most important sources of Cretaceous fishes in Mexico.

The genus name is a combination of Cipactli, the Aztec mythological sea monster said to be part fish and part reptile, and ichthys, Greek for "fish". The specific epithet scutatus is Latin for shielded, referring to the large dorsal and ventral scutes.

== Description ==
Cipactlichthys is an elongate fish, approximately 130 mm in total length, or 100 mm in standard length. Its dermal bones and scales are covered in ganoine and decorated with tubercles and ridges. The jaw extends to behind the rear end of the orbit. The pectoral fins are relatively long, with the first ray extending to the anterior edge of the pelvic fins. The caudal fin is forked and homocercal (upper and lower lobes of equal length). The dorsal fin contains at least 8 fin rays. The anal fin is larger than the dorsal fin and also bears at least 8 rays. The scales vary greatly in size and shape, with a series of large plate-like scutes along the dorsal and ventral midline behind the dorsal and anal fin.

== Classification ==
Cipactlichthys is classified in the clade Halecomorphi due to possession of a crescent-shaped preopercle and the involvement of the symplectic bone in jaw articulation. However, it has not yet been assigned to an order or family, instead considered a halecomorph of uncertain placement (incertae sedis). The only living halecomorph is the bowfin, Amia calva, but this group has a diverse fossil record. A phylogenetic analysis placed Cipactlichthys as sister to a clade containing Amiiformes and the extinct order Ionoscopiformes.

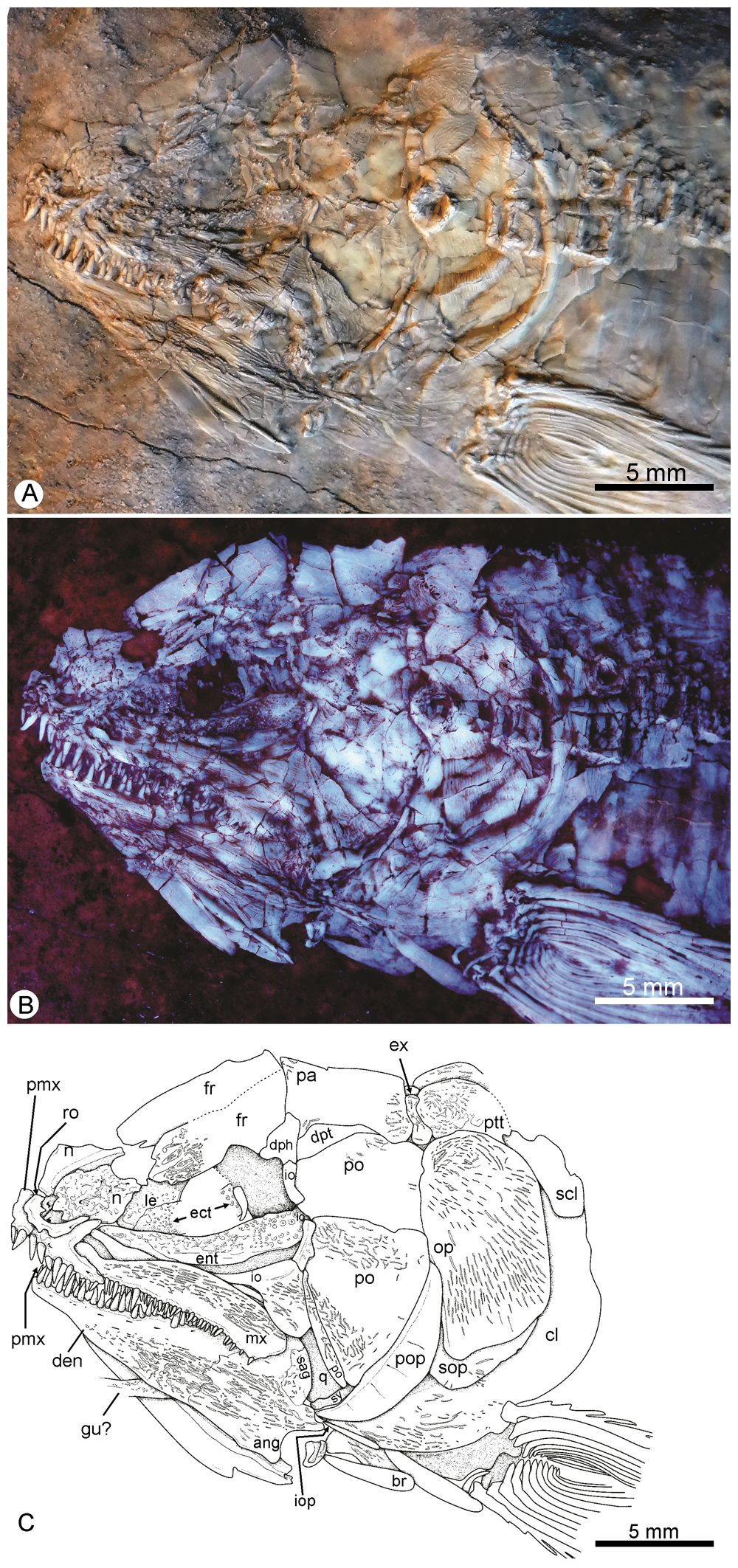
A) Photograph of the head region; B); Photograph under UV light, C) anatomical interpretations. Scale bar equals 5 mm.

- Polypterus
- - Acipenser
  - Neopterygii
    - Holostei
      - Halecomorphi
        - - Cipactlichthys
          - - Amiiformes
              - Callamopleurus
              - Amia
            - Ionoscopiformes
              - Placidichthys
              - Oshunia
        - Watsonulus
      - Ginglymodi
        - Lepidotes
        - Lepisosteiformes
          - Dentilolepisosteus
          - Atractosteus
    - Teleostei
      - Elops
      - Cladocyclus

Phylogenetic analysis of Brito & Alvarado-Ortega, 2013
