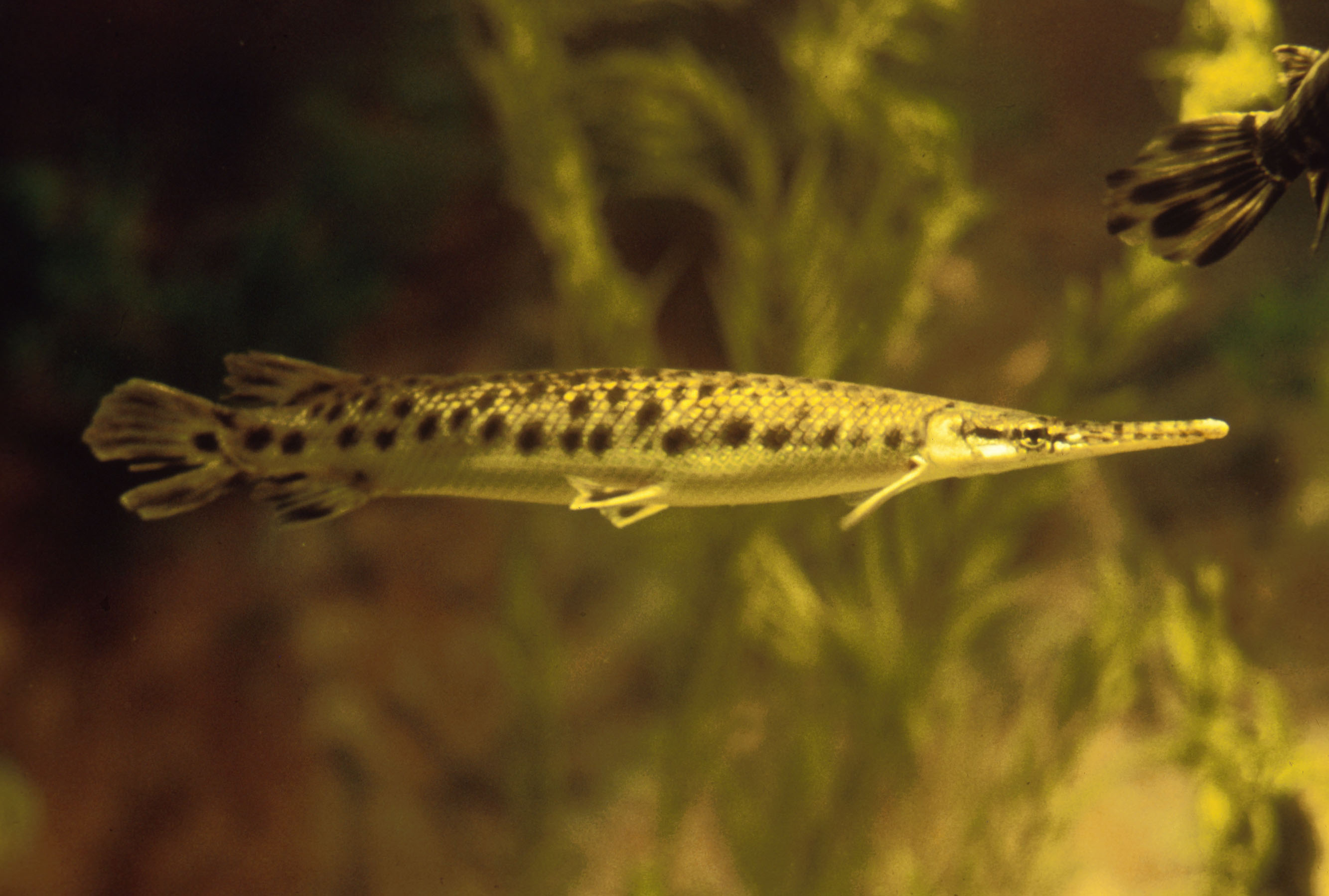
- Spotted gar, Lepisosteus oculatus
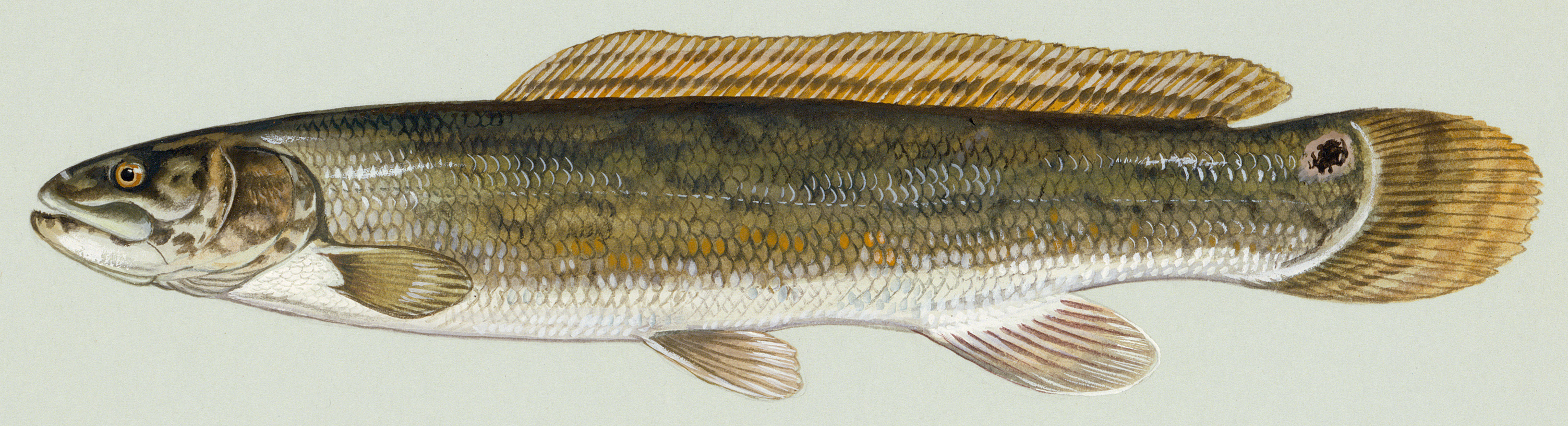
- Bowfin, Amia calva

Scientific classification
- Kingdom: Animalia
- Phylum: Chordata
- Class: Actinopterygii
- Subclass: Neopterygii
- Infraclass: Holostei; Müller, 1846

Clades (with orders)
- Halecomorphi; Amiiformes; †Ionoscopiformes; †Parasemionotiformes; †Panxianichthyiformes; Ginglymodi; †Kyphosichthyiformes; Lepisosteiformes; †Semionotiformes; † Dapediidae (incertae sedis)

= Holostei =

Holostei Temporal range: Middle Permian to present

Group of bony fish

Holostei is a group of ray-finned bony fish. It is divided into two major clades, the Halecomorphi, represented by the single living genus, Amia with two species, the bowfins (Amia calva and Amia ocellicauda), as well as the Ginglymodi, the sole living representatives being the gars (Lepisosteidae), represented by seven living species in two genera (Atractosteus, Lepisosteus). The earliest members of the clade, which are putative "semionotiforms" such as Acentrophorus and Archaeolepidotus, are known from the Middle to Late Permian and are among the earliest known neopterygians.

Holostei was thought to be regarded as paraphyletic. However, a recent study provided evidence that the Holostei are the closest living relatives of the Teleostei, both within the Neopterygii. This was found from the morphology of the Holostei, for example presence of a paired vomer. Holosteans are closer to teleosts than are the chondrosteans, the other group intermediate between teleosts and cartilaginous fish, which are regarded as (at the nearest (Note: Depending who you ask, the Chondrostei may be paraphyletic, or the Polypteridae may be considered not part of them.)) a sister group to the Neopterygii.

The spiracles of holosteans are reduced to vestigial remnants and the bones are lightly ossified. The thick ganoid scales of the gars are more primitive than those of the bowfin.

== Characteristics ==
Holosteans share with other non-teleost ray-finned fish a mixture of characteristics of teleosts and sharks. In comparison with the other group of non-teleost ray-finned fish, the chondrosteans, the holosteans are closer to the teleosts and further from sharks: the pair of spiracles found in sharks and chondrosteans is reduced in holosteans to a remnant structure: in gars, the spiracles do not even open to the outside; the skeleton is lightly ossified: a thin layer of bone covers a mostly cartilaginous skeleton in the bowfins. In gars, the tail is still heterocercal but less so than in the chondrosteans. Bowfins have many-rayed dorsal fins and can breathe air like the bichirs.

In the holosteans a primary pulmonoid (respiratory) swim bladder is still present, a trait that was independently lost in both chondrostei and teleostei, the only other two lineages of fish with a swim bladder (in some teleosts the swim bladder have since evolved to become secondarily respiratory again).

The gars have thick ganoid scales typical of sturgeons whereas the bowfin has thin bony scales like the teleosts. The gars are therefore in this regard considered more primitive than the bowfin.

The name Holostei derives from the Greek words holos, meaning whole, and osteon, meaning bone: a reference to their bony skeletons.

== Systematics of Neopterygii ==
The evolutionary relationships of gars, bowfin and teleosts were a matter of debate. There are two competing hypotheses on the systematics of neopterygians:

=== Halecostomi hypothesis ===
The Halecostomi hypothesis proposes Halecomorphi (bowfin and its fossil relatives) as the sister group of Teleostei, the major group of living neopterygians, rendering the Holostei paraphyletic.

- Neopterygii
  - Halecostomi
    - Teleostei
    - Halecomorphi
  - Ginglymodi

=== Holostei hypothesis ===
The Holostei hypothesis, where the gars and bowfin form the clade Holostei as the sister group to Teleostei, is better supported than the Halecostomi hypothesis, rendering the latter paraphyletic. It proposes Halecomorphi as the sister group of Ginglymodi, the group which includes living gars (Lepisosteiformes) and their fossil relatives. It is estimated that the last common ancestor of gars and bowfin lived at least 250 million years ago.

- Neopterygii
  - Teleostei
  - Holostei
    - Halecomorphi
    - Ginglymodi

Ginglymodi comprises three orders: Lepisosteiformes, Semionotiformes and Kyphosichthyiformes. Lepisosteiformes includes 1 family, 2 genera, and 7 species that are commonly referred to as gars. Semionotiformes and Kyphosichthyiformes are extinct orders.

Halecomorphi contains the orders Parasemionotiformes, Panxianichthyiformes, Ionoscopiformes, and Amiiformes. In addition to many extinct species, Amiiformes includes only 1 extant species that is commonly referred to as the bowfin. Parasemionotiformes, Panxianichthyiformes, and Ionoscopiformes have no living members.

Gars and bowfins are found in North America and in freshwater ecosystems. The differences in each can be spotted very easily from just looking at the fishes. The gars have elongated jaws with fanlike teeth, only 3 branchiostegal rays, and a small dorsal fin. Meanwhile the bowfins have a terminal mouth, 10–13 flattened branchiostegal rays, and a long dorsal fin.

== Phylogeny of bony fishes ==
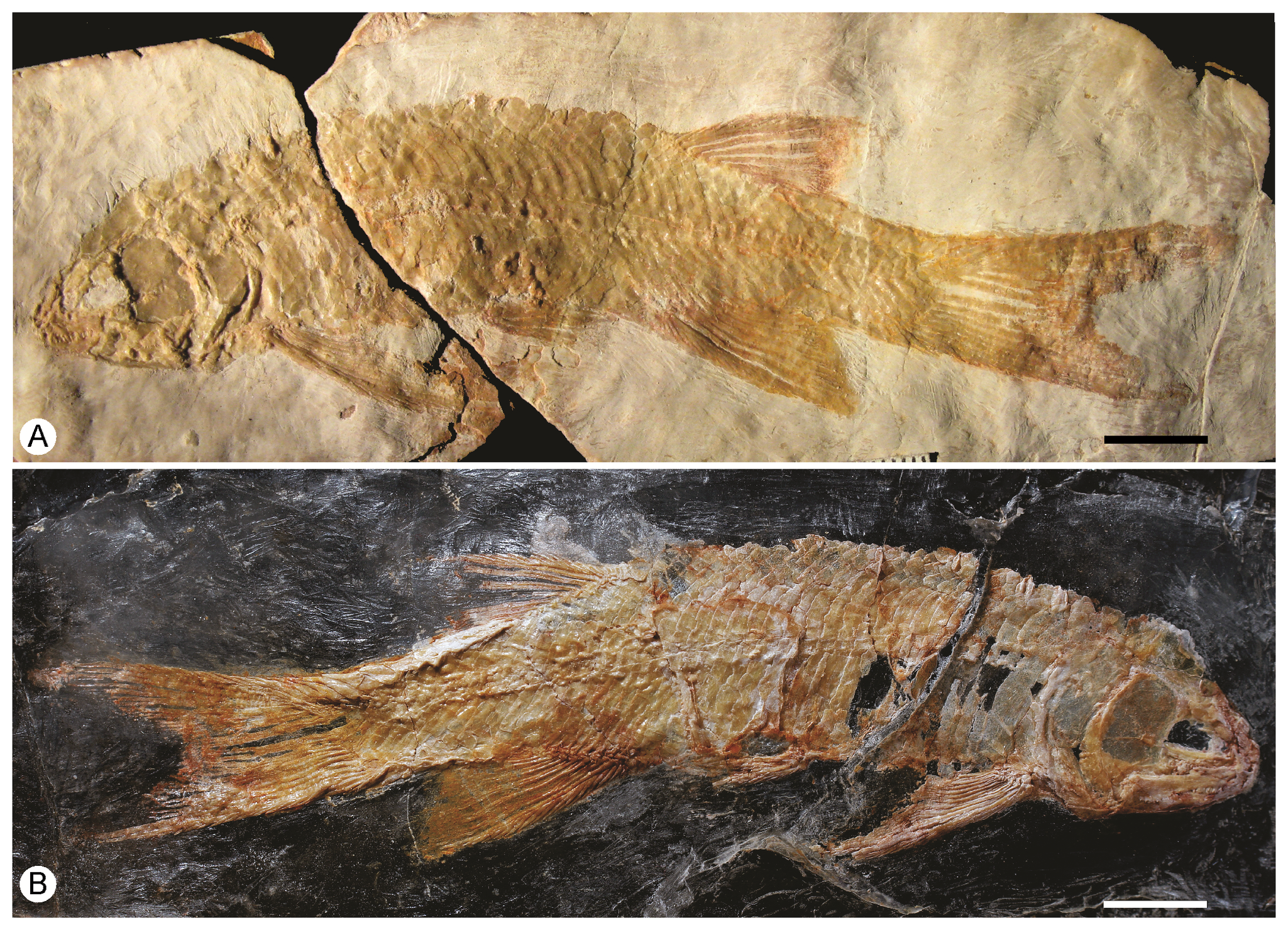
Cipactlichthys scutatus holotype fossil, from the Lower Cretaceous Tlayua Formation of Mexico

The cladogram shows the relationships of holosteans to other living groups of bony fish (Osteichthyes), the great majority of which are teleosts, and to the terrestrial vertebrates (tetrapods) that evolved from a related group of lobe-finned fish. Approximate dates are from Near et al. (2012).

- Euteleostomi/ Osteichthyes
  - Sarcopterygii
    - Actinistia (Coelacanths)
    - - Dipnoi (Lungfish)
      - - Tetrapods
          - Amphibians
          - Amniota
            - Mammals
            - Sauropsids (reptiles, birds)
  - Actinopterygii 400 mya
    - - part of "Chondrostei" (Note: Thus the former "Chondrostei" is not a clade, but is broken up. See Actinopteri for a possible reclassification.) Polypteridae (bichirs)
      - - part of "Chondrostei"
          Acipenseriformes (sturgeons, paddlefish)
        - Neopterygii 360 mya
          - Teleostei 310 mya
          - Holostei (bowfins, gars) 275 mya
