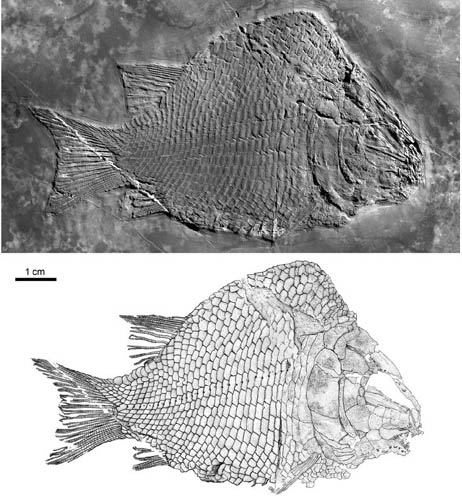
- Holotype skeleton of K. grandei

Scientific classification
- Kingdom: Animalia
- Phylum: Chordata
- Class: Actinopterygii
- Clade: Ginglymodi
- Order: †Kyphosichthyiformes
- Family: †Kyphosichthyidae
- Genus: †Kyphosichthys; Xu & Wu, 2011
- Species: †K. grandei

Binomial name
- †Kyphosichthys grandei Xu & Wu, 2011

= Kyphosichthys =

Kyphosichthys Temporal range: Middle Triassic, Anisian

Extinct genus of ray-finned fishes

Kyphosichthys is an extinct genus of basal actinopterygian bony fish known from the lower Middle Triassic (Anisian) marine deposits (Guanling Formation) in Luoping, eastern Yunnan Province, southwestern China. The species is the first known fossil record of highly deep-bodied ginglymodians.

== Description ==
Kyphosichthys (Greek for "bent fish") has a strongly arched hump between the head and the dorsal fin, from which its name derives. The holotype measures 96 mm in total length, and 76 mm in standard length. The greatest body height occurs at the posterior opercular margin, where the body height is over 70% of the standard length. The dorsal fin and anal fin are located far back on the body, the latter is only half as long as the dorsal fin. The pelvic fins are much smaller than the pectoral fins. The forked caudal fin is hemi-heterocercal due to a heavy lobe extending into the dorsal lobe of the fin, but outwardly is nearly symmetrical. The body is covered in ganoid scales; those of the anterior flank are decorated with ornate ridges and tubercles while the scales further back are smoother.

In describing Kyphosichthys, Xu and Wu compared its body form to modern day deep-bodied fish such as the boarfish and butterflyfish (Chaetodon sp.), and inferred that Kyphosichthys was similarly a slow swimmer but highly maneuverable, likely adapted to structurally complex habitats.

== Classification ==
When it was first described, Kyphosichthys was assigned as incertae sedis within Ginglymodi, a group of Holostean fish which includes the living gars as well as extinct species. A phylogenetic analysis of Kyphosichthys and other Mesozoic neopterygians placed Kyphosichthys in an unresolved polytomy with Lepisosteus (living gars) and the extinct Semionotus.

- - Neopterygii
    - - - - - Teleostei
              - - Leptolepis
                - Pholidophorus
              - Dapedium
            - Holostei
              - Halecomorphi
                - Amia
                - Watsonulus
              - Ginglymodi
                - - Lepisosteus
                  - Semionotus
                  - Kyphosichthys
                - Macrosemius
          - Luganoia
        - Felberia
      - Perleidus
    - Australosomus
  - - Acipenser
    - Birgeria
