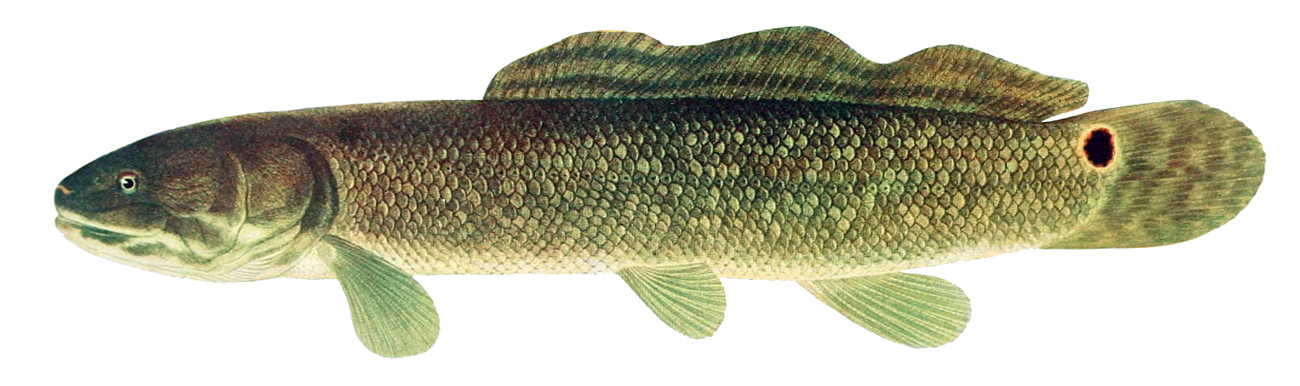
- Amia calva (bowfin)
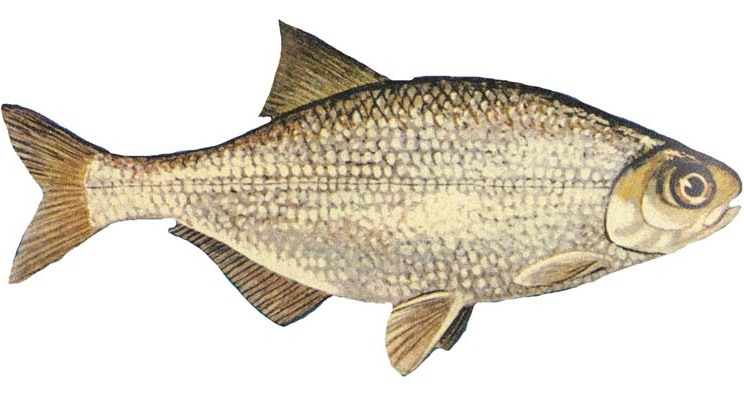
- Hiodon tergisus

Scientific classification
- Kingdom: Animalia
- Phylum: Chordata
- Class: Actinopterygii
- Subclass: Neopterygii
- (unranked): Halecostomi; Regan, 1903

Subdivisions
- Halecomorphi; Teleostei

= Halecostomi =

Group of ray-finned fishes

Halecostomi is the name of a group of neopterygian fish uniting the halecomorphs (represented by the living bowfin and many extinct groups) and the teleosts, the largest group of extant ray-finned fish.

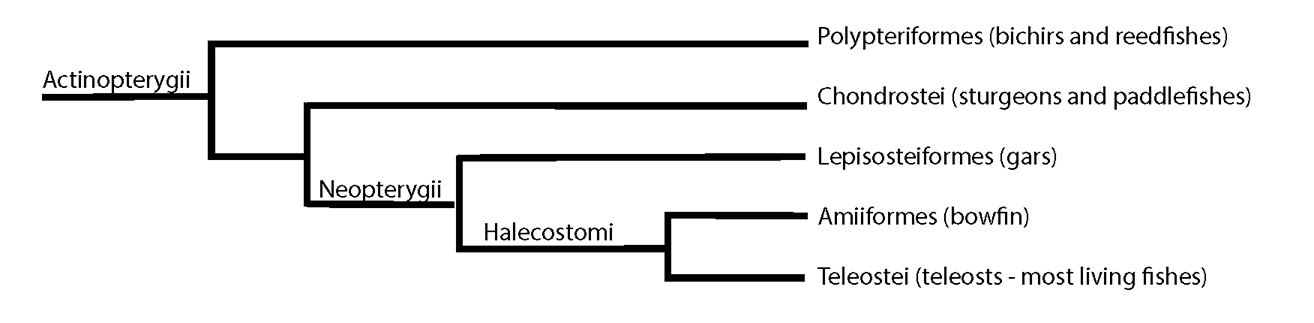
Outdated phylogenetic hypothesis of Actinopterygii proposing a sister group relationship between Amiiformes (Halecomorphi) and Teleostei

The Halecostomi hypothesis and the Holostei hypothesis are two competing hypotheses explaining the evolutionary relationships of living ray-finned fish. The Holostei hypothesis is better supported, rendering the Halecostomi a paraphyletic group (i.e., rejecting the Halecostomi hypothesis).

The Holostei hypothesis posits that Ginglymodi (gars and their fossil relatives) and Halecomorphi form a clade, called Holostei, and that the Holostei are the sister group to the Teleostei.

- Neopterygii
  - Holostei
    - Ginglymodi (gars and their fossil relatives)
    - Halecomorphi (bowfin and its fossil relatives)
  - Teleostei
