= Tlayúa Formation =

Geologic formation in Mexico

- Stratigraphic range: Albian–Cenomanian
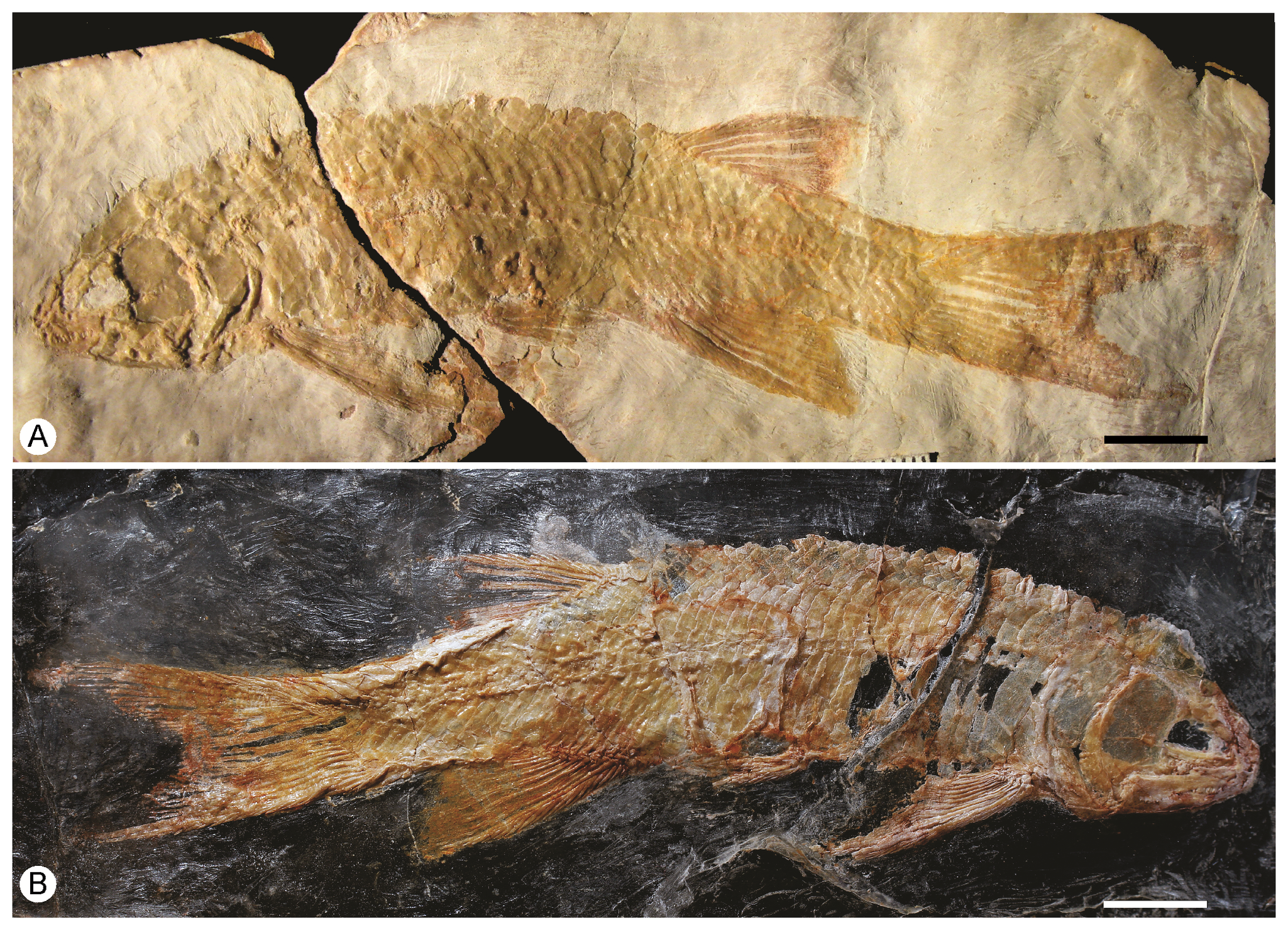
- Cipactlichthys scutatus, one of the fossil fish from Tlayúa Formation
- Type: Geological formation
- Sub-units: Lower, Middle and Upper Members
- Underlies: Unconformity with Eocene-Oligocene Pie de Vaca Formation
- Overlies: Orizaba Formation
- Thickness: Lower: 50 m, Middle: 35 m, Upper: 40 m

Lithology
- Primary: Limestone
- Other: Mudstone

Location
- Coordinates: 19.1°N 98.2°W
- Approximate paleocoordinates: 17.1°N 61.6°W
- Region: Puebla
- Country: Mexico

Type section
- Named for: Tlayúa Quarry
- Tlayúa Formation (Mexico)

The Tlayúa Formation is an Cretaceous Konservat-Lagerstätte near Tepexi de Rodríguez, Puebla, Central Mexico. It consists of three members (Lower, Middle and Upper), spanning the lower Albian of the Early Cretaceous to the lower Cenomanian of the Late Cretaceous. It consists of a series of limestone quarries that preserve lagoonal palaeoenvironments, such as a shelf lagoon, a shallow lagoon surrounded by a peneplain, and a tidal flat. It is notable for preserving high quantities of vertebrate and invertebrate fossils, and is thus considered a Lagerstätte.

== Description ==
The Tlayúa Formation was first described by Jerjes Pantoja-Alor in 1992. It is located in the Tlayúa ravine, which itself lies in the southern portion of Puebla, Central Mexico, near Tepexi de Rodríguez, and consists of a series of limestone quarries that has seen commercial use for decades.

=== Stratigraphy ===
The Tlayúa Formation consists of two stratigraphic units (Tlayúa and Barranca Abuelo) and three members. The Lower Member is lower Albian in age. It consists of bioturbated limestones, and is characterised by the presence of the non-rudist bivalve Chondrodonta and the rudist bivalve Toucasia polygyra. The Middle Member, corresponding to the Tlayúa Quarry, is the most fossiliferous. Its age has been difficult to ascertain, as the foraminiferan Spiroloculina cretacea is known exclusively from lower Cenomanian strata, though it has since been determined to be Upper Albian. The Middle Member consists of fine-grained lithographic limestones, interspersed with hematitic layers that preserve its vertebrate fauna. The Upper Member is Cenomanian in age, and consists of a sequence of dolomites. It is characterised by the presence of the miliolid foraminiferan Dicyclina schlumbergi.

=== Depositional environments ===
The depositional environment of the Tlayúa Formation was likely a shallow, coastal lagoon, with some freshwater influence, as indicated by the presence of crocodilian and turtle fossils. The Lower Member of the Tlayúa Formation represents a carbonate environment which apparently had stressed biodiversity. The depositional environment of the Middle Member was likely arid for much of the year, with the exception of seasonal rains and storms. The Upper Member likely represents a tidal flat. The Tlayúa Formation may have been part of an island, though a connection to the North American mainland cannot be discounted.

== Paleobiota ==
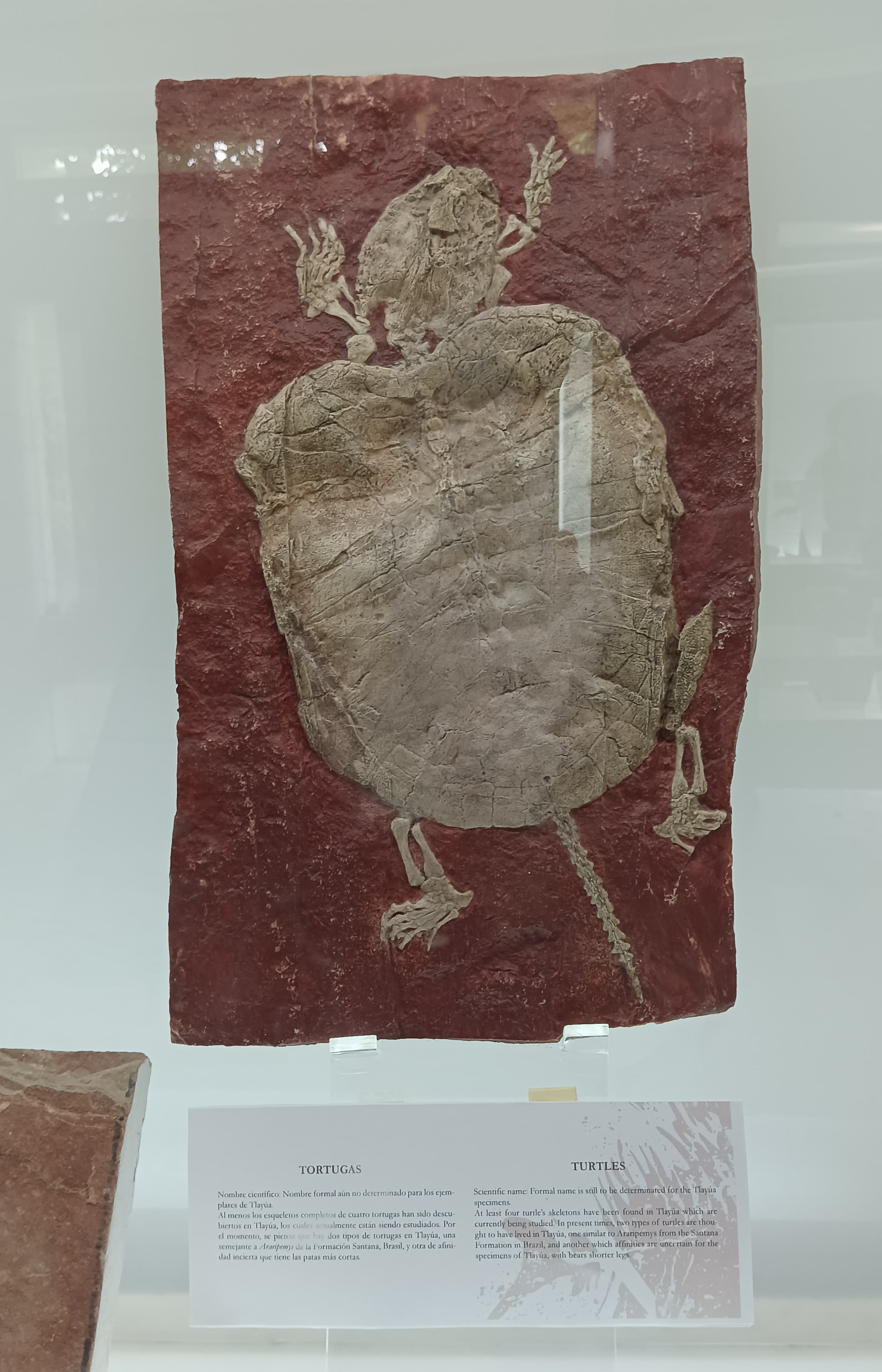
Undescribed turtle, exhibited in Tepexi Museum, Tepexi de Rodríguez

The formation contains a diverse array of vertebrate and invertebrate fossils. For this reason, it is considered a Konservat-Lagerstätte. About 70% of the macrofossils are osteichthyan fish. Other vertebrates include chelonians, pterosaurs, lepidosaurs, and crocodiles. Cyanobacteria, foraminifera, algae, gymnosperms, sponges, cnidarians, annelids, gastropods, ammonites, bivalves, arachnids, insects, isopods, anomurans, brachyurans, crinoids, echinoids, holothuroids, stelleroids, and ophiuroids, have also been recovered from the Tlayúa Formation.

Color key
Taxon	Reclassified taxon	Taxon falsely reported as present	Dubious taxon or junior synonym	Ichnotaxon	Ootaxon	Morphotaxon

Notes
Uncertain or tentative taxa are in small text; ~~crossed out~~ taxa are discredited.

=== Archelosaurs ===
The remains of several indeterminate archelosaur taxa have been recovered from the Tlayúa Formation. Indeterminate crocodilians and turtles have been identified. Partial, articulated wings of an unidentified pterosaur have been discovered from the formation. Though tentatively assigned to Pteranodon sp. and Nyctosaurus sp. in 2008, they likely represent either an early azhdarchoid or an indeterminate ornithocheiromorph.

=== Lepidosaurs ===
Genus	Species	Material	Notes	Images
Huehuecuetzpalli	H. mixtecus	Near-complete specimens of an adult and a juvenile	A primitive lizard	H. mixtecus reconstruction
Pamizinsaurus	P. tlayuaensis	A single, crushed skull of a juvenile	An osteoderm-covered sphenodontian	P. tlayuaensis reconstruction
Ankylosphenodon	A. pachyostosus	Front half of a partial skeleton	An aquatic sphenodontian	
Tepexisaurus	T. tepexii	Near-complete skeleton, minus the tail	A basal scincomorph	

=== Fish ===
Mainly after González-Rodríguez (2016) and Applegate et al. (2006)

Fish
Genus	Species	Higher taxon	Notes	Images
Amblysemius?	cf. A. sp	Caturidae	Only non-amiid amiiform from Tlayúa	Fossil of Amblysemius from Solnhofen
Araripichthys	A. weberi	Teleostei	Possibly related to Late Cretaceous genera from North America?	Fossil of A. castilhoi
Armigatus	A. felixi, A. carrhenoae	Ellimmichthyiformes	First records of Armigatus from America, alongside the oldest species in the genus, the two species from Tlayúa also seem to clade closest to each other	Fossil of A. brevissimus from Lebanon
Aspidorhynchidae spp.	Inapplicable	Teleostei	Undescribed species of Vinctifer and Belonostomus have been recorded	Fossil of Vinctifer comptoni
Axelrodichthys	A. cf. A. araripensis	Mawsoniidae	Only known specimen was lost before description	A. araripensis fossil from Brazil
Bananogmius?	cf. B. sp	Tselfatiiformes	One of the few Mexican members of the clade other than Tselfatia	Reconstruction of B. aratus
Cipactlichthys	C. scutatus	Halecomorphi	Bears large plate-like scutes along its midline	C. scutatus holotype
Ellimmichthys	E. sp	Ellimmichthyiformes	Type genus of its order	Illustration of E. goodi
Elopomorpha spp.	Unapplicable	Teleostei	Possible species of Brannerion, Paraelops and Megalops are known	The extant Atlantic tarpon, a species in the genus Megalops
Epaelops	E. martinezi	Elopiformes	Related to the Jurassic Anaethalion	
Gonorynchiformes indet.	Unapplicable	Ostariophysi	One specimen reported in the 1990s, but has not been studied since	The extant milkfish, a modern gonorynchiform
Lycoptera?	cf. L. sp	Lycopteridae	Only osteoglossiform fossil from Cretaceous Mexico	L. davidii reconstruction
Macrosemiocotzus	M. americanus	Macrosemiidae	Similar to Macrosemius, but differs in a divided dorsal fin	M. americanus reconstruction
Michin	M. csernai	Pachyrhizodontidae	Likely the most basal pachyrhizodontid	
Neoproscinetes	N. sp	Pycnodontidae	Related to Proscinetes	Fossil of N. penalvai from the Santana Group
Notagogus	N. novomundi	Macrosemiidae	Closest to Notagogus helenae	Reconstruction of N. denticulatus
Nusaviichthys	N. nerivelai, N. antigonae	Pachyrhizodontoidei	Formerly misidentified as Notelops fossils	
Pachyamia	P. mexicana	Vidalamiinae	Also known from the Middle East	
Paraclupea	P. seilacheri	Ellimmichthyiformes	First fossil of the genus outside of China	
Ranulfoichthys	R. dorsonudus	Clupeomorpha	Somewhat resembles Ellimmichthyiformes, but lacks their dorsal scutes, therefore it is likely a basal clupeomorph	
Quetzalichthys	Q. perilliatae	Ionoscopiformes (Halecomorphi)	Likely closest to Oshunia	Fossil of Q. perrilliatae under UV light
Tahnaichthys	T. magnuserrata	Pycnodontidae	Bears two humps in front of its dorsal fin, a novel trait in pycnodonts	
Teoichthys	T. kallistos, T. brevipina	Ophiopsidae (Halecomorphi)	Name of the type species (Teoichthys kallistos) translates to "God's most beautiful fish", in reference to the exquisite preservation	Fossil of T. kallistos under UV light
Tepexichthys	T. aranguthyorum	Pycnodontidae	Likely fed on coral, as shown by gut contents and the large amount of wear on its teeth	
Tlalocbatos	T. applegatei	Rhinopristiformes	Only chondrichthyan known from Tlayúa	
Tlayuamichin	T. iztli	Semionotiformes	Specific name translates to "obsidian", after the colour of the scales	
Unamichthys	U. espinosai	Ichthyodectiformes	Discovered alongside two other currently undescribed ichthyodectiforms	
Yabrudichthys?	cf. Y. sp	Aulopiformes	Likely an enchodontid, mainly known from the Ein Yabrud site (hence its generic name)	

=== Arthropods ===
Arthropods
Genus	Species	Higher taxon	Notes	Images
Archaeoniscus	A. aranguthyorum	Sphaeromatidea?	Bears an unusual axial pouch unlike all extant isopods, may have been a fish ectoparasite or scavenger like modern cymothoids	Speculative life restoration of Archaeoniscus coreaensis
Atocatle	A. ranulfoi	Mesothelae?	Indeterminate family due to poor preservation, likely within Mesothelae due to its distinct abdominal segments, but more recently its affinity as a spider is questioned	
Ixtahua	I. benjamini	Anisoptera?	Only known from a nymph, matches dragonfly nymphs in shape	
Protaegla	P. miniscula	Aeglidae	Earliest aeglid fossil known	An Aegla individual of unknown species from Argentina
Tepexicarcinus	T. tlayuaensis	Tepexicarcinidae (basal Eubrachyura)	Formerly assigned questionably to Homolidae due to an absence of clear carapace regions, but then separated into its own family as a basal eubrachyuran	
Tipulidae indet.	Unapplicable	Tipuloidea	Only known from a wing pair	The extant tipulid Tipula paludosa

=== Echinoderms ===
Arthropods
Genus	Species	Higher taxon	Notes	Images
Astropecten	A. sp	Astropectinidae	Known from juvenile fossils preserving both dorsal and ventral sides	Specimen of the extant A. duplicatus
Echinaster	E. sp	Echinasteridae	Only known from a fossil in dorsal view	An Echinaster sepositus found in Arrábida National Park, Portugal
Ophiactis	O. applegatei	Ophiactidae	One of the few articulated ophiuroids from the Early Cretaceous	An extant Ophiactis savignyi from Mexico
Ophidiaster	O. sp	Ophidiasteridae	One of the few starfish from this formation which is not known from juvenile specimens	An Ophidiaster ophidianus found in Cabo de Palos, Spain
Paleopentacta	P. alencasterae	Cucumariidae	Likely an infaunal suspsension feeder based on extant relatives	The extant cucumariid Pentacta lutea
Parapsolus	P. tlayuensis	Psolidae	Likely a suspension-feeder attached to hard substrates based on extant psolids	The extant psolid Psolus phantapus
Plutonaster	P. sp	Astropectinidae	Known from a juvenile specimen	A Plutonaster observed on Kelvin Seamount
Tamaria	T. sp	Ophidiasteridae	Known from a juvenile	A Tamaria observed near the Mariana Islands

=== Mollusks ===
- Inoceramus sp.
- Pectinidae indet.
- Osteridae indet.
- Gastropoda indet.
- Neohibolites minimus obtusus
- Neohibolites minimus pinguis
- Neohibolites minimus claviformis
- Neohibolites praeultimus
- Mesohibolites semicanaliculatus
- Martoniceras sp.
- Hysteroceras sp.
- Anisoceras sp.

=== Other invertebrates ===
- Porifera
- Anthozoa
- Annelida

=== Plants ===
- cf. Araucaria sp.
- cf. Frenolopsis
- Brachyphyllum sp.
- Podozamites sp.
- Zamites sp.
- Phaeophyceae
