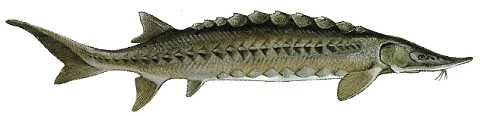
- Atlantic sturgeon (Chondrostei)
- Atlantic salmon (Neopterygii)

Scientific classification
- Kingdom: Animalia
- Phylum: Chordata
- Class: Actinopterygii
- Clade: Actinopteri; Cope, 1871

Subclasses
- Chondrostei; Neopterygii

= Actinopteri =

Group of fishes

Actinopteri (/æktɪˈnɒptəraɪ/) is the sister group of Cladistia (bichirs) in the class Actinopterygii (ray-finned fish).

Dating back to the Permian period, the Actinopteri comprise the Chondrostei (sturgeons and paddlefish), the Holostei (bowfins and gars), and the teleosts; in other words, all extant ray-finned fish other than the bichirs.

In this clade the lungs have evolved into a swim bladder.

Characters of Actinopteri include paired fin structure, a single dorsal fin, fulcra, a large median gular and numerous branchiostegals, ganoid scales, and a valvula cerebelli in the brain.

== Classification ==
The following cladogram summarizes the evolutionary relationships of extant Actinopteri. Divergence time for each clade in mya are based on:

- Actinopteri 400 mya
  - Chondrostei
    Acipenseriformes (sturgeons, paddlefish)
  - Neopterygii 360 mya
    - Teleostei 310 mya
    - Holostei 275 mya
      - Halecomorphi
        Amiiformes (bowfin)
      - Ginglymodi
        Lepisosteiformes (gars, alligator gars)
