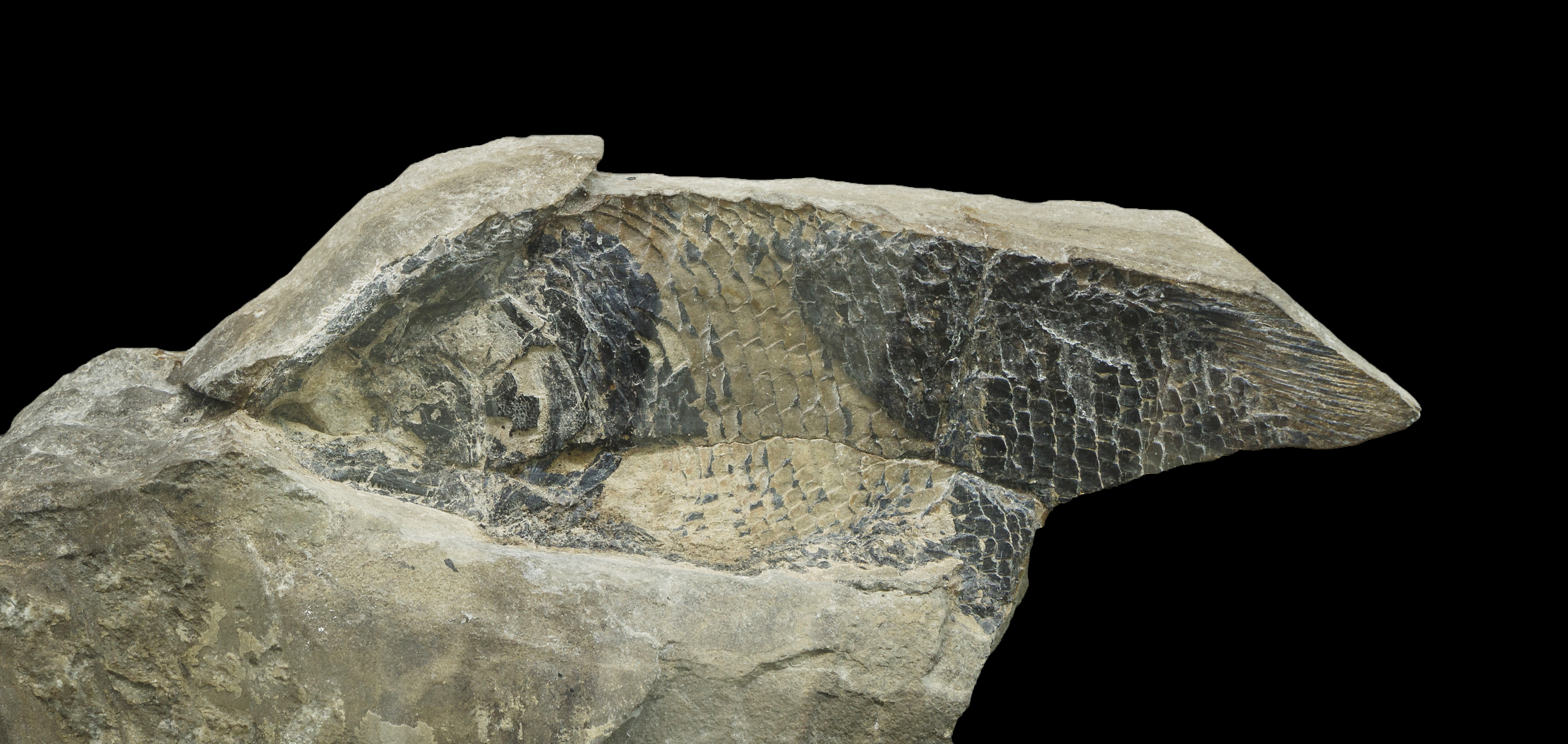
- Archaeolepidotus leonardii (holotype)

Scientific classification
- Domain: Eukaryota
- Kingdom: Animalia
- Phylum: Chordata
- Class: Actinopterygii
- Clade: Ginglymodi (?)
- Genus: †Archaeolepidotus; Accordi, 1955
- Species: †A. leonardii

Binomial name
- †Archaeolepidotus leonardii Accordi, 1955

= Archaeolepidotus =

Archaeolepidotus Temporal range: Latest Permian

Extinct genus of fishes

Archaeolepidotus is an extinct genus of prehistoric marine holostean bony fish that lived during the latest Permian or earliest Triassic in what is now Trentino-Alto Adige, Italy. It contains a single species, A. leonardii. It is among the earliest known fossil neopterygians, and is usually recovered as a semionotiform, but others recover it as a parasemionotiform.

Although initially recovered as being from the Early Triassic Werfen Formation, more recent analyses suggest that it is very unlikely to be from the Triassic sediments of that formation. It is thus thought to actually originate from the Late Permian Bellerophon Formation, making it particularly ancient.

== See also ==
- Prehistoric fish
- List of prehistoric bony fish
