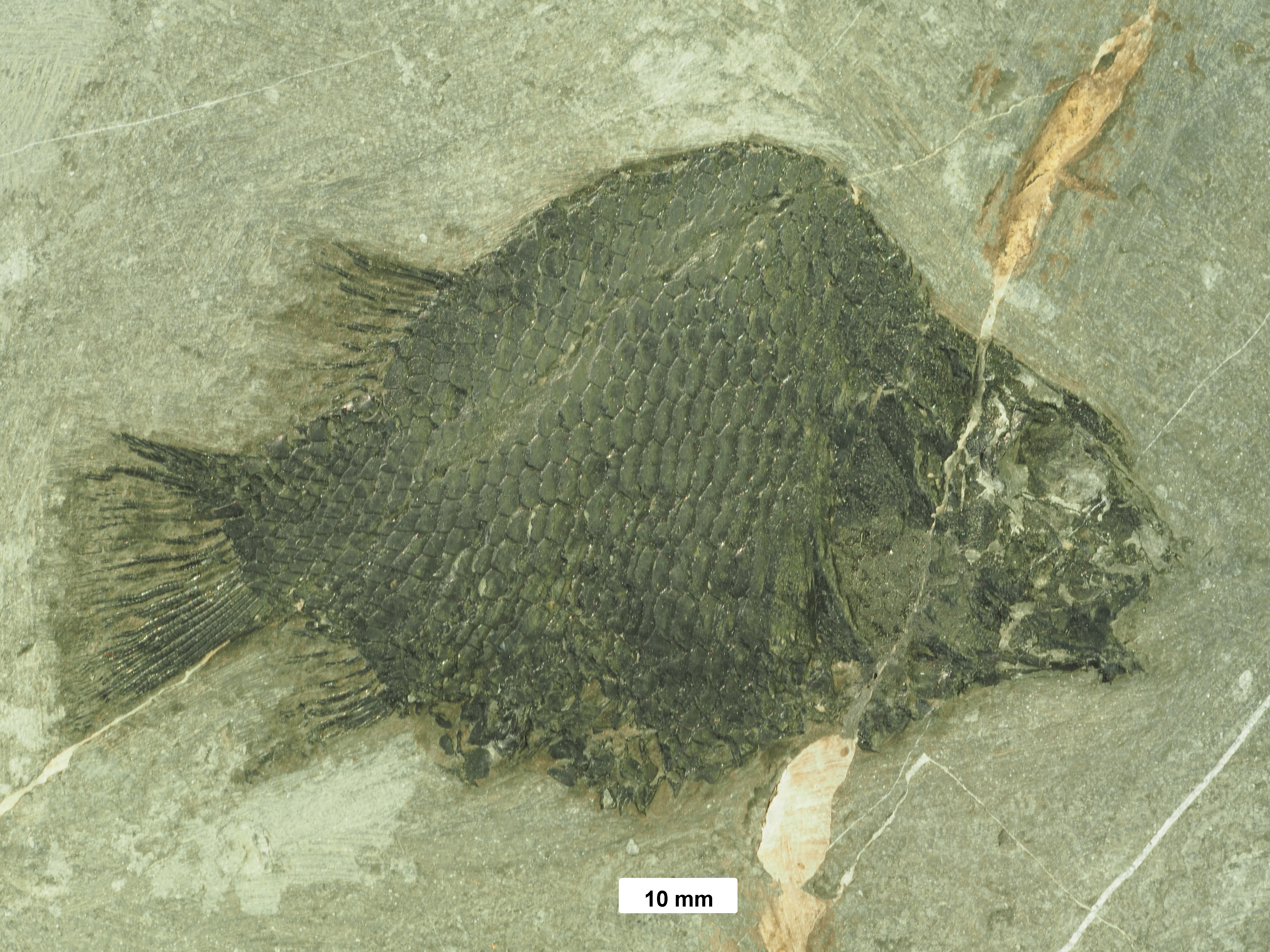
- A specimen of Kyphosichthys, the type genus of the order and Kyphosichthyidae
- Lashanichthys, the type genus of Lashanichthyidae

Scientific classification
- Kingdom: Animalia
- Phylum: Chordata
- Class: Actinopterygii
- Clade: Ginglymodi
- Order: †Kyphosichthyiformes; Sun & Ni, 2018

Type genus
- Kyphosichthys Xu & Wu 2012

Families
- Kyphosichthyidae; Fuyuanichthys; Kyphosichthys; Lashanichthyidae; Lashanichthys; Yudaiichthys

= Kyphosichthyiformes =

Kyphosichthyiformes Temporal range: Middle Anisian (Pelsonian) -Ladinian 244 –240 Ma

Extinct order of fishes

Kyphosichthyiformes is an extinct order of marine ginglymodians endemic to China during the Early to Middle Triassic. Members of the order can differ in body shape, ranging from fusiform to hunch backed. It represents the basal-most order within Ginglymodi, with it being only more derived than taxa like Ticinolepis. Based on differences in morphology, members of the order most likely had a variety of ecologies. While the deeper bodied members were most likely slow swimmers in complex environments, more fusiform members were more likely in less complex environments. One genus, Lashanichthys, has been suggested to have schooled due to how common of a fossil it is. The order is made up of two families: Kyphosichthyidae and Lashanichthyidae.

== History and classification ==
The order Kyphosichthyiformes along with the family Kyphosichthyidae was first coined by Zuoyu Sun and Peigang Ni in their 2018 redescription of Kyphosichthys. At the time, these were treated as the same term due to Kyphosichthyidae making up all members of the order. In the same year, Adriana López-Arbarello and Emilia Sferco published a paper focused on Neopterygian phylogeny. This paper countered the monophyly of the order due to features said to be features of fish, such as the shape of the infraorbitals, in the order being inconsistent. In 2019, Guang-Hui Xu and coauthors published a paper both naming two new genera and reviewing the systematics of basal ginglymodians. This resulted in a new definition of Kyphosichthyiformes along with the naming of Lashanichthyidae, a second family within the order. Lashanichthys, one of the two genera named in the paper, was named in the publication due to Sangiorgioichthys being paraphyletic within analyses. The phylogenetic analyses of the publication placed the order as the basal-most order of Gingylomodi, though still more derived than Ticinolepis. This placement within Ginglymodi has consistently been recovered other papers such as the 2024 publication by Xu and Xin-Ying Ma along with the 2025 publication by Xu and coauthors. The phylogenic analysis from the most recent publication, Xu et al. 2025, can be found below:

- - Ginglymodi
    - Diandongichthys
    - - Ticinolepis
      - - Kyphosichthyiformes
        - - Sangiorgioichthys
          - - Semionotiformes
            - Lepisosteiformes

=== Internal relationships ===
In the original 2018 publication, the members of Kyphosichthyiformes included: Sangiorgioichthys, Luoxiongichthys, and Kyphosichthys. While López-Arbarello and Sferco argued the monophyly of Kyphosichthyidae, they did place both Sangiorgioichthys and Kyphosichthys as closely related basal gingylomodians. In the 2019 publication by Xu and coauthors, it was determined that there were four genera within the order that are largely split into two families. The first family, a redefined Kyphosichthyidae, contains Kyphosichthys and Fuyuanichthys. The other family newly coined in the publication, Lashanichthyidae, containing Lashanichthys and Yudaiichthys. It was also found that Luoxiongichthys did not possess some diagnostic features of the group. The phylogenic analysis from the publication can be found below:

- - Kyphosichthyiformes
    - - Fuyuanichthys wangi
      - Kyphosichthys grandei
    - - Yudaiichthys eximius
      - - Lashanichthys sui
        - Lashanichthys yangjuanensis

== Description ==
The order Kyphosichthyiformes is made up of small fish with the largest members only having the standard length of 12.5 centimetres (4.9 in). The body shape of these fish range between more fusiform fish such as Lashanichthys and the hunch-backed Kyphosichthys. As with a majority of other groups of fossil fish, the order is largely defined by features of the skull. Though some are unique to the order, a few were also convergently evolved in Macrosemiidae.

The frontal bones of kyphosichthyiforms is very large, being up to two times the length of the parietals. The dermopterotic, a bone found ventral to the parietals, is shorter than the parietals. Unlike in most other ginglymodians, the maxilla of the fish ends near the front of the orbit. As in the closely related Sangiorgioichthys, kyphosichthyiforms have a smaller amount of anterior infraorbitals than in other ginglymodians. The amount of suborbitals, bones behind the infraorbital series, differ wildly between genera. While kyphosichthyids only have two to three bones in the series, lashanichthyids can have between three and six. The preorbital portion of the skull is also slightly longer in kyphosichthyids than lashanichthyids. In contrast to this, the mandible of lashanichthyids is longer than the mandible of kyphosichthyids. Unlike other ginglymodians. kyphosichthyiforms possess a median gular. The pectoral fins of the fish are placed low on the body. As with other ginglymodians, the dorsal fin originates between the pelvic and anal fins. The anal fin is slightly smaller than the dorsal fin, both being placed right in front of the caudal peduncle. The caudal fin of kyphosichthyiforms is slightly forked with a row of long scales next to the ventral border of the lower lobe. All members of the order are covered in smooth rhombic scales, some of which can be serrated. As with some other ginglymodians, peg-and-socket articulation between the scales is present.

== Paleobiology ==
All known members of Kyphosichthyiformes are found within marine ecosystems of what is now China, with authors suggesting that the order was potentially endemic to the region. While a some genera were more uncommon within there environment based on what has been found, Lashanichthys is the most common fish within the Luoping ichthyofauna. It has even been suggested that the fish would have formed schools due to this. There is a large amount of variation in body shape between the two families. Kyphosichthyids were most likely slow swimmers that were good and maneuvering through more complex environments. In contrast to this, lashanichthyids most likely lived in much more simple environments.
