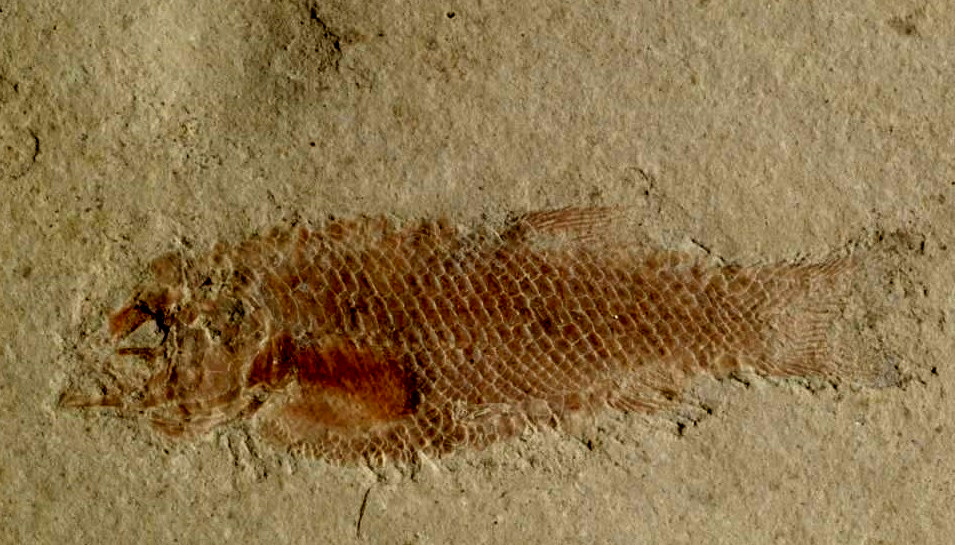
- Acentrophorus varians
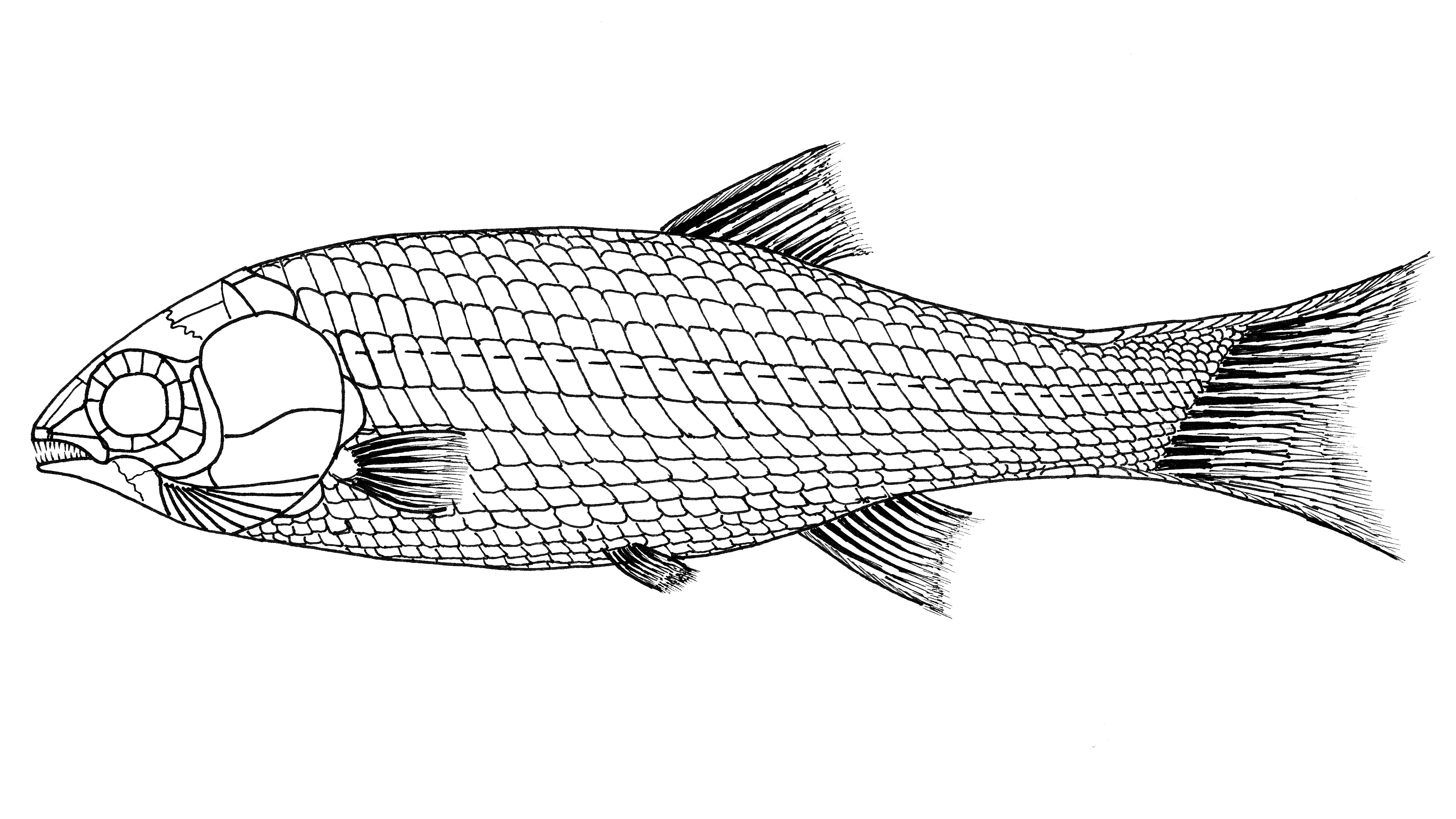

Scientific classification
- Kingdom: Animalia
- Phylum: Chordata
- Class: Actinopterygii
- Clade: Ginglymodi (?)
- Family: †Acentrophoridae; Berg, 1936
- Genus: †Acentrophorus; Traquair, 1877

Type species
- †Palaeoniscus glaphyrus Agassiz, 1835

Species
- See text

= Acentrophorus =

Acentrophorus Temporal range: Roadian to Wuchiapingian Possible Anisian occurrence

Extinct genus of fishes

Acentrophorus is an extinct genus of prehistoric freshwater and marine ray-finned fish from the Roadian (Guadalupian/Middle Permian) to the Wuchiapingian (Lopingian/late Permian) of England (Marl Slate), Germany (Kupferschiefer), Italy (Val Gardena) and Russia (Baitugan Formation). There may also be a Triassic occurrence in Australia.

== Classification ==
The type species, Acentrophorus glaphyrus, was first described under the genus name "Palaeoniscus" (=Palaeoniscum) by Louis Agassiz. Ramsay H. Traquair later erected a new genus for this species, Acentrophorus, to which he also referred the species "Palaeoniscus" abbsii, "P." altus and "P." varians. Some studies suggest that Archaeolepidotus, another very early holostean, may be a junior synonym of this genus.

Acentrophorus is considered to be the oldest known neopterygian, the group of ray-finned fish that encompasses the vast majority of extant species. It is often classified into its own family, Acentrophoridae. It is generally referred to the ginglymodian order Semionotiformes. However, the genus has been described as "enigmatic" and "pending restudy".

=== Species ===
The following species are known:

- †A. abbsii (Kirkby, 1862) (Late Permian of the United Kingdom)
- †A. altus (Kirkby, 1864) (Late Permian of the United Kingdom)
- †A. glaphyrus (Agassiz, 1833) (syn: A. varians (Kirkby, 1862)) (Middle to Late Permian of the United Kingdom, Germany and Russia)
- †A. robustus Brandt, 2021 (Late Permian of Italy)

The former species A. dispersus from the Late Carboniferous of the Czech Republic has been reclassified into Spinarichthys in the Aeduellidae. The former species "A. chicopensis" Newberry, 1888 from the Late Triassic/Early Jurassic Portland Formation of Massachusetts is both significantly younger than other members of the genus and has differing morphology, and it is thus no longer considered to belong to the genus.

== See also ==
- Prehistoric fish
- List of prehistoric bony fish
