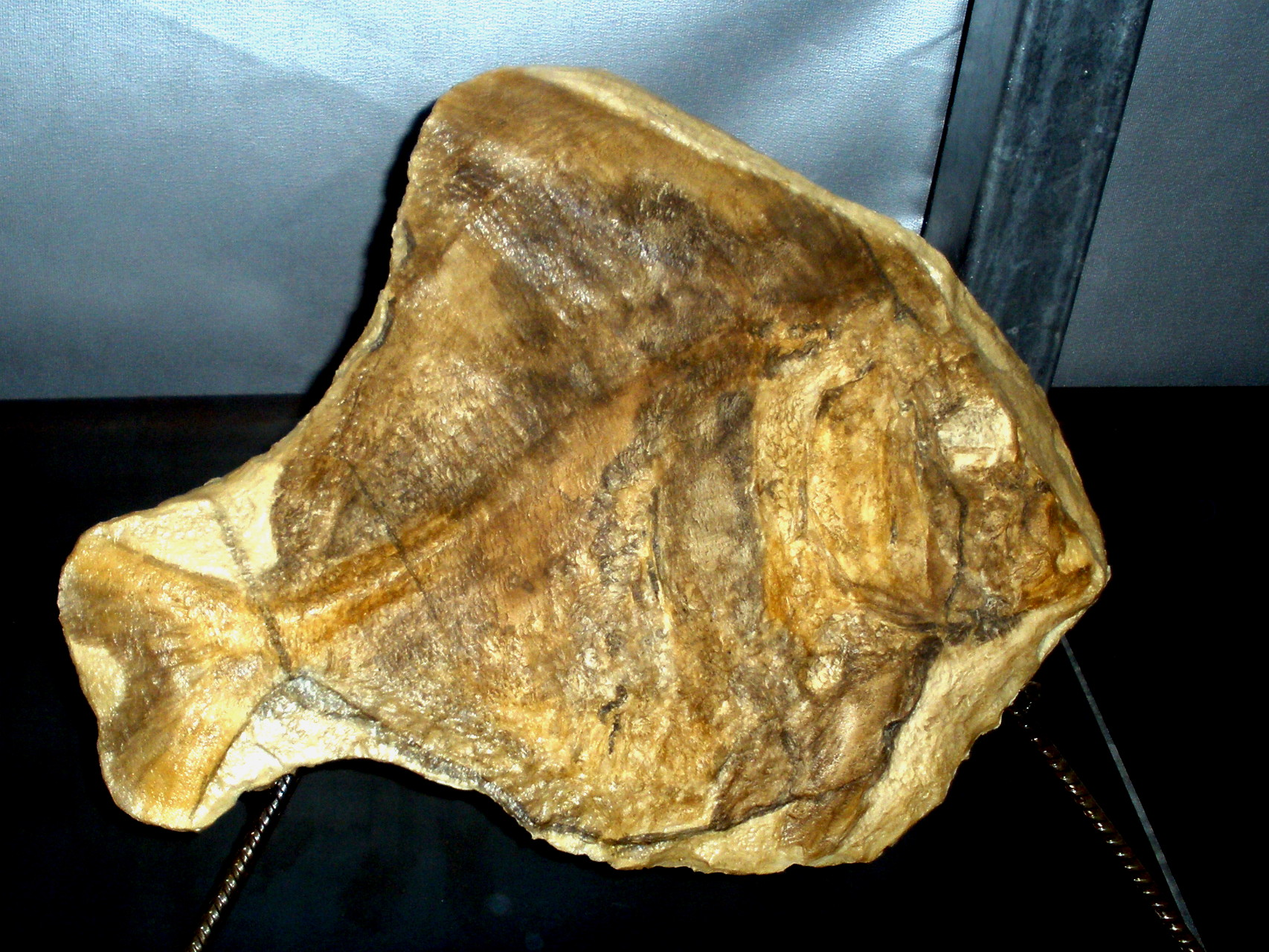
- Fossil of Araripichthys

Scientific classification
- Domain: Eukaryota
- Kingdom: Animalia
- Phylum: Chordata
- Class: Actinopterygii
- Division: Teleostei
- Order: †Araripichthyiformes; Nelson et al., 2016
- Family: †Araripichthyidae; Silva Santos, 1985
- Genus: †Araripichthys; Silva Santos, 1985

Species
- See text

= Araripichthys =

Araripichthys Temporal range: Aptian-Coniacian ~125–89.3 Ma

Extinct genus of ray-finned fishes

Araripichthys is an extinct genus of marine ray-finned fish that lived from the Aptian to Coniacian stages of the Cretaceous period. The genus is named after the Araripe Basin, where it was found in the Crato and Santana Formations. Other fossils of the genus have been found at Goulmima in Morocco, the Tlayua Formation of Mexico and the Apón Formation of Venezuela.

It contains the following species:

- †A. axelrodi Maisey & Moody, 2001 - Aptian of Venezuela
- †A. castilhoi Silva Santos, 1985 (Type) - Albian of Brazil
- †A. corythophorus Cavin, 1997 - Turonian/Coniacian of Morocco
- †A. weberi Alvarado-Ortega & Brito, 2011 - Albian of Mexico

Based on the stratigraphy and location of these fossils, it has been suggested that Araripichthys originated in what is now either the Pacific or Caribbean region in the early Cretaceous, and dispersed eastwards to the Tethyan region, where it survived until later in the Cretaceous. Its taxonomic relationships still remain uncertain. An affinity to the genera Ferrifrons and Acanthichthys from the Late Cretaceous of North America has been suggested by some studies.
