= Tepexi de Rodríguez =

Coordinates: 18°35′N 97°56′W

- Municipality and town
- Interactive map of Tepexi de Rodríguez
- Country: Mexico
- State: Puebla
- Time zone: UTC-6 (Zona Centro)

Tepexi de Rodríguez (Otomian languages: Anmêye, 'stone') is a town and municipality in the Mexican state of Puebla.

== Paleontology of Tepexi Image Gallery ==
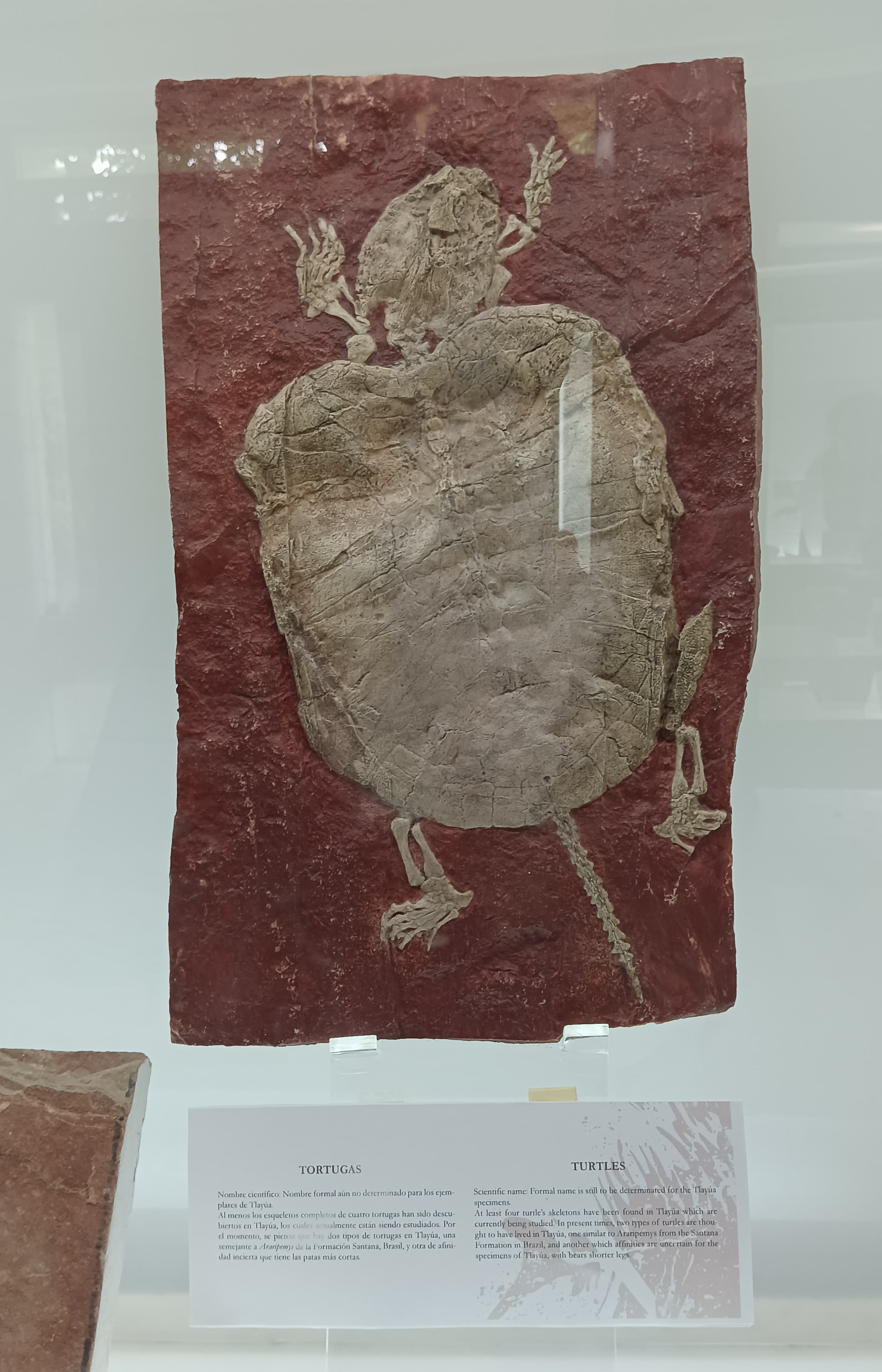
Fossil turtle at the Tepexi Museum

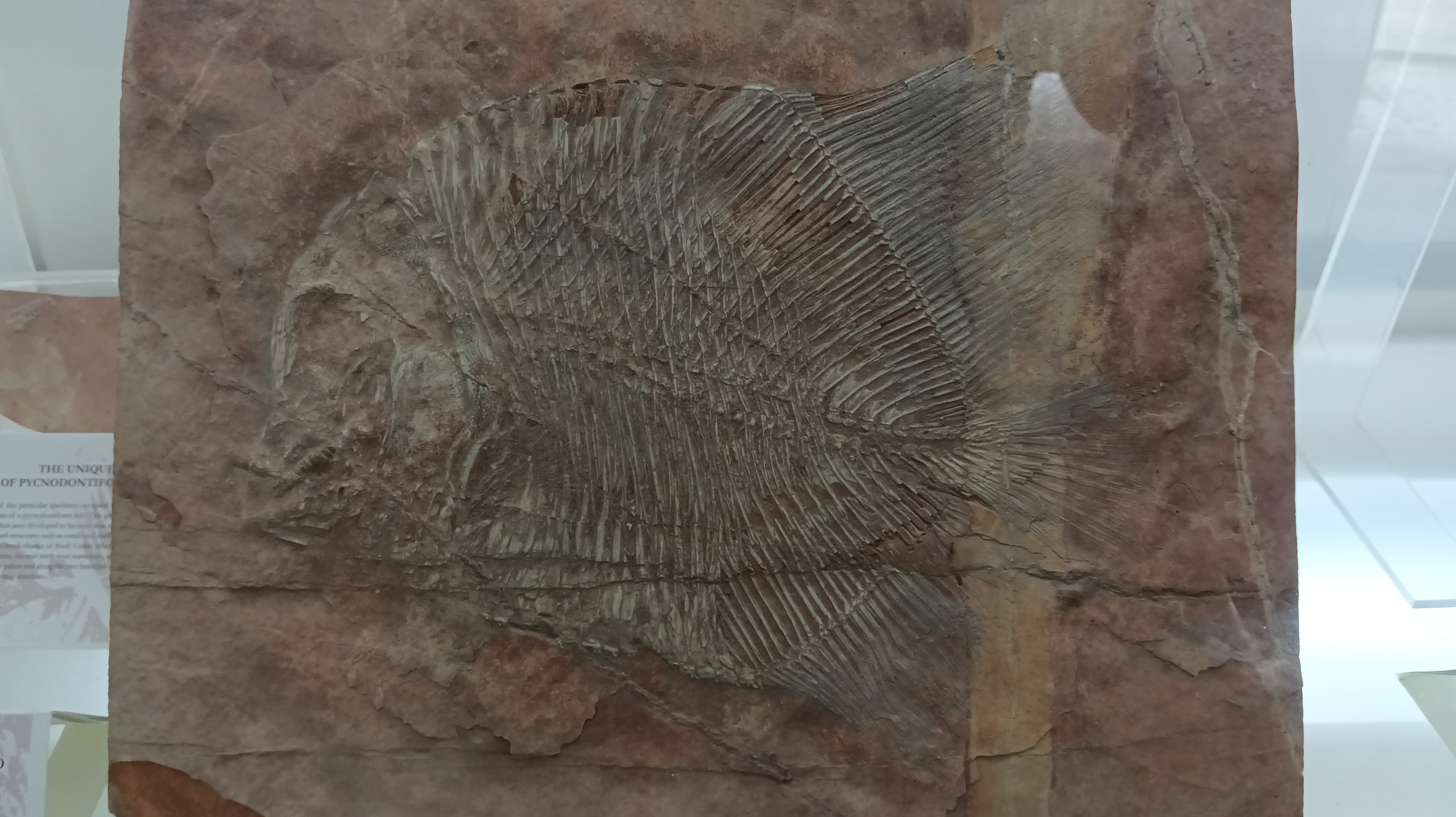
Fossil fish at the Tepexi Museum

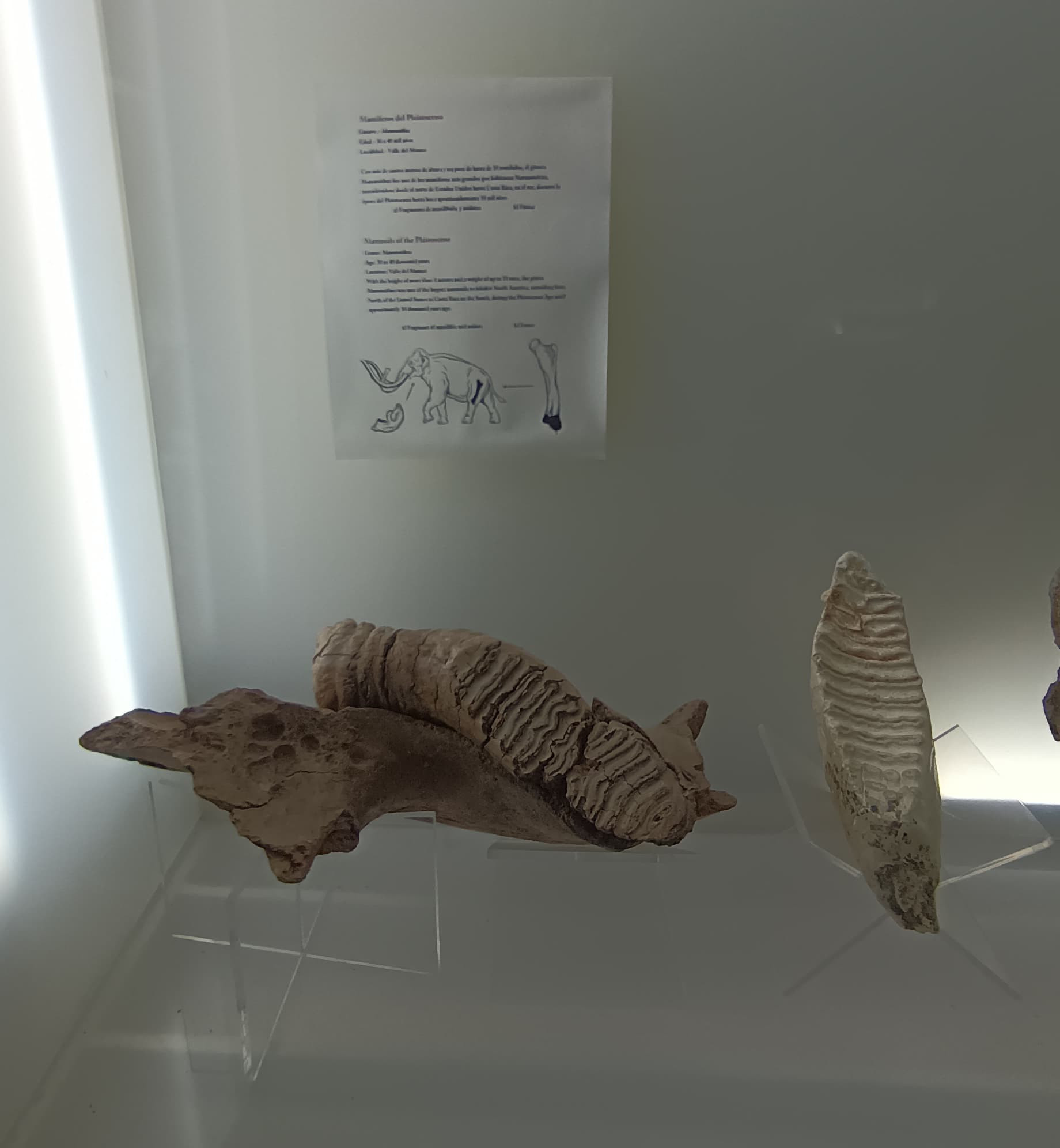
Fossil mammal tooth at the Tepexi Museum

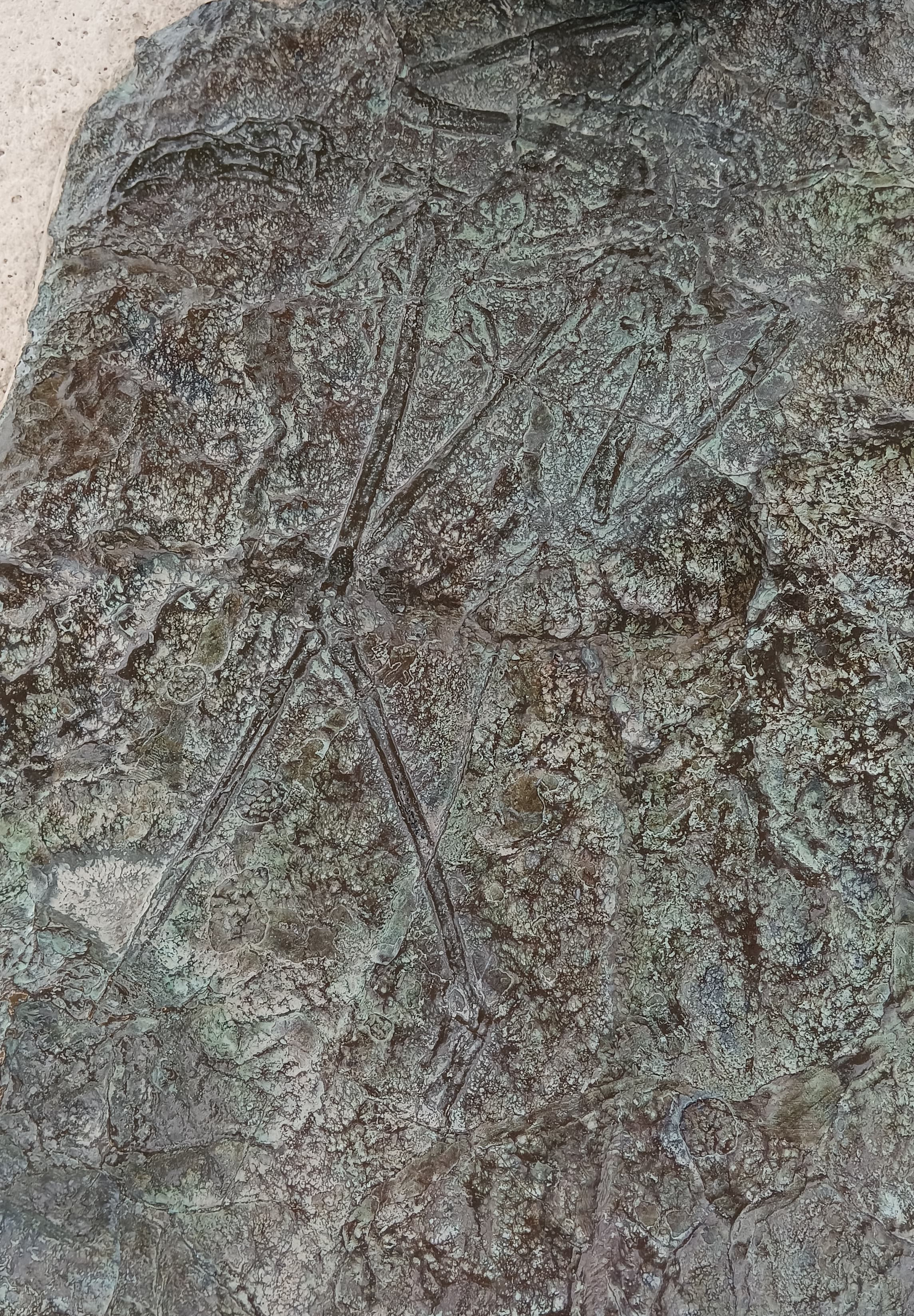
Copper mold of a fossil flamingo.

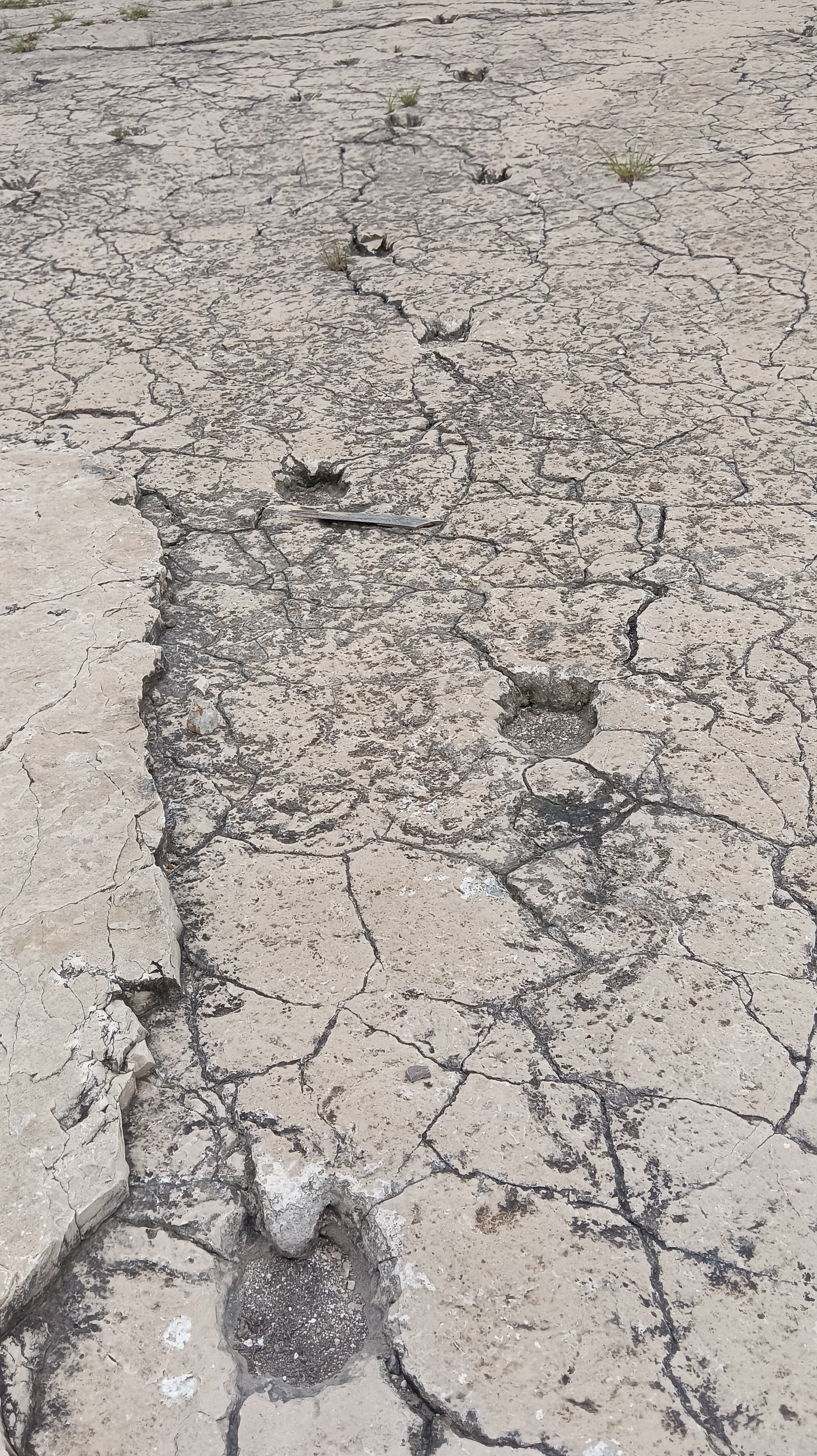
Camelid "cow's foot" ichnites in Tepexi (1)

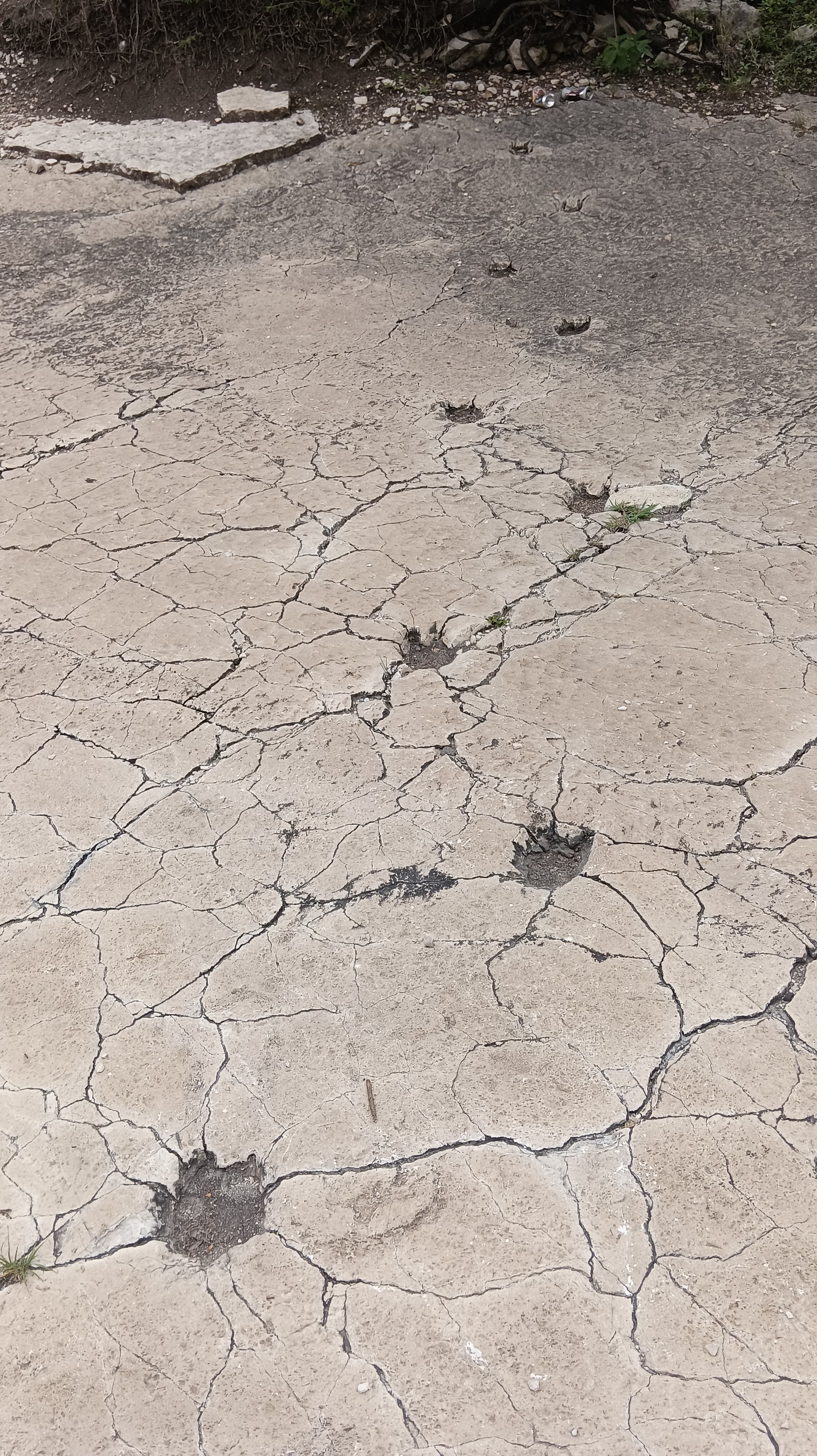
Camelid "cow's foot" ichnites in Tepexi (2)

== See also ==
- Tepexi el Viejo
