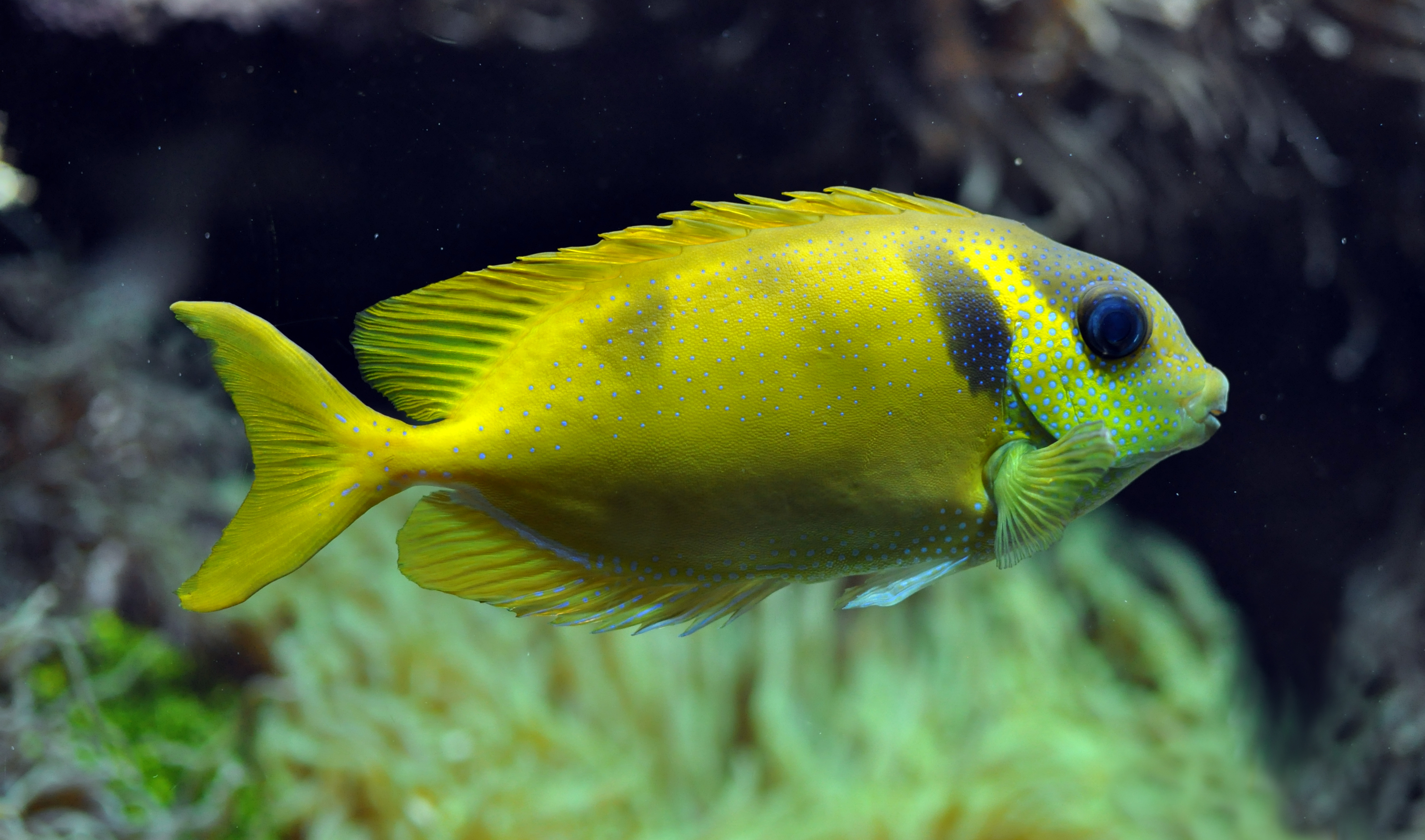
- Siganus corallinus (a teleost)
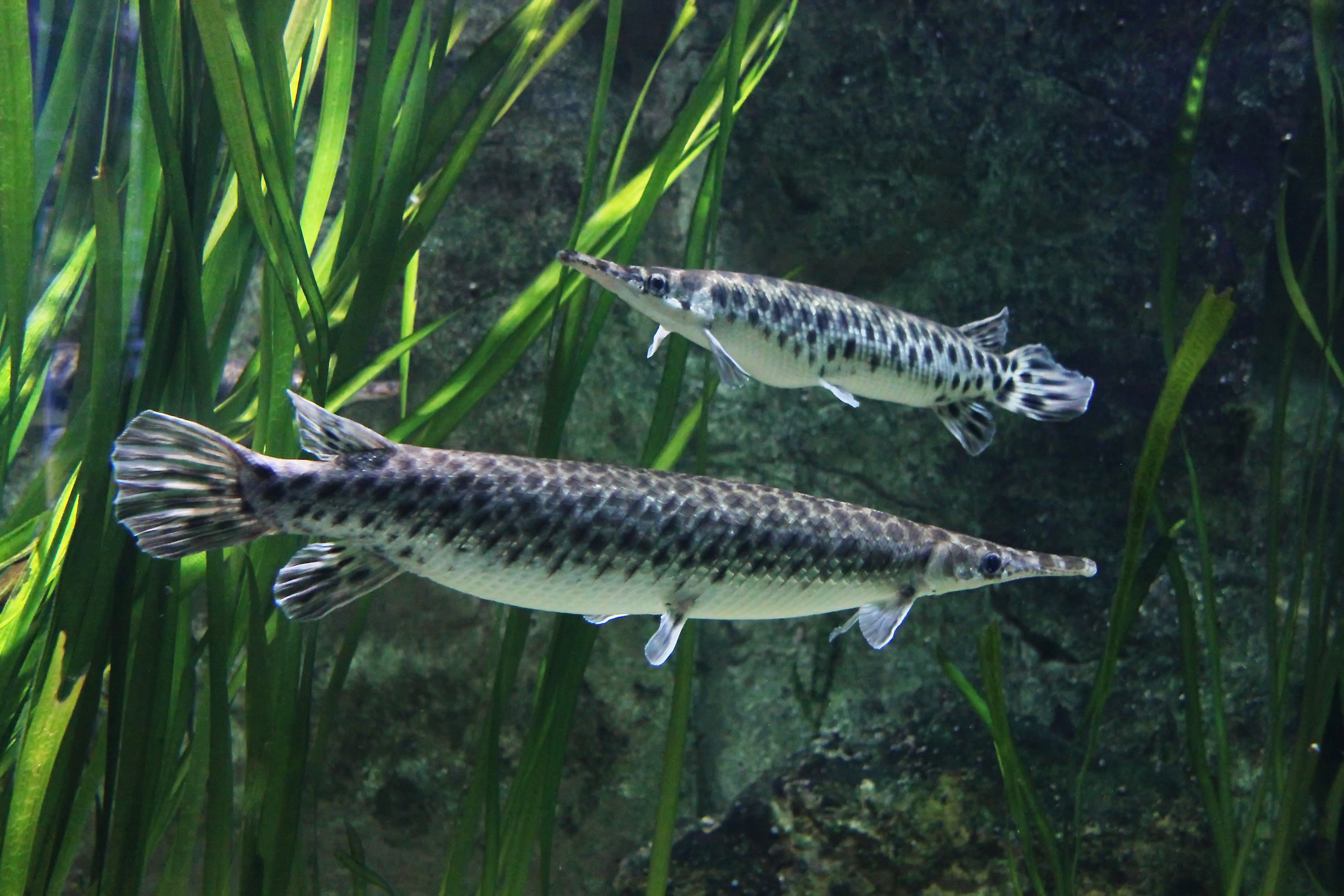
- Lepisosteus oculatus (a holostean)

Scientific classification
- Kingdom: Animalia
- Phylum: Chordata
- Class: Actinopterygii
- Clade: Actinopteri
- Subclass: Neopterygii; Regan, 1923

Infraclasses
- Holostei; Teleosteomorpha; †Pycnodontiformes; For others, see text

= Neopterygii =

Neopterygii Temporal range: Early Carboniferous–Present

Subclass of fishes

Neopterygii (from Ancient Greek νέος (néos), meaning "new", and πτέρυξ (ptérux), meaning "wing, fin") is a subclass of ray-finned fish (Actinopterygii). Neopterygii includes the Holostei and the Teleostei, of which the latter comprise the vast majority of extant fishes, and over half of all living vertebrate species. While living holosteans include only freshwater taxa, teleosts are diverse in both freshwater and marine environments. Many new species of teleosts are scientifically described each year.

The potentially oldest known neopterygian is the putative "semionotiform" Acentrophorus varians from the Middle Permian of Russia; however, one study incorporating morphological data from fossils and molecular data from nuclear and mitochondrial DNA, places this divergence date at least 284 mya (million years ago), during the Artinskian stage of the Early Permian. Another study suggests an even earlier split (360 myr ago, near the Devonian-Carboniferous boundary).

- Vertebrates
  - Jawless fishes (118 living species: hagfish, lampreys)
  - Jawed vertebrates
    - Cartilaginous fishes (>1,100 living species: sharks, rays, chimaeras)
    - Bony fishes
      - - Lobe-fins
          - Actinistia (2 living species: coelacanths)
          - Rhipidistia
            - Dipnoi (6 living species: lungfish)
            - Tetrapoda (>30,000 living species: amphibians, mammals, reptiles, birds)
        - Ray-fins
          - Cladistia (14 living species: bichirs, reedfish)
          - Actinopteri
            - Chondrostei (27 living species: sturgeons, paddlefish)
            - Neopterygii (>32,000 living species)

== Evolution and diversity ==
Living neopterygians are subdivided into two main groups (infraclasses): teleosts and holosteans. Holosteans comprise two clades, the Ginglymodi and the Halecomorphi. All of these groups have a long and extensive fossil record. The evolutionary relationships between the different groups of Neopterygii is summarized in the cladogram below (divergence time for each clade in mya are based on).

- Neopterygii 360 mya
  - Holostei 275 mya
    - Ginglymodi (7 living species: gars and alligator gars)
    - Halecomorphi (2 living species: bowfin and eyespot bowfin)
  - 310 mya
    Teleostei (>32,000 living species)

Neopterygians are a very speciose group. They make up over 50% of the total vertebrate diversity today, and their diversity grew since the Mesozoic era. However, the diversity of the various groups of neopterygians (or of fishes in general) is unevenly distributed, with teleosts making up the vast majority (96%) of living species.

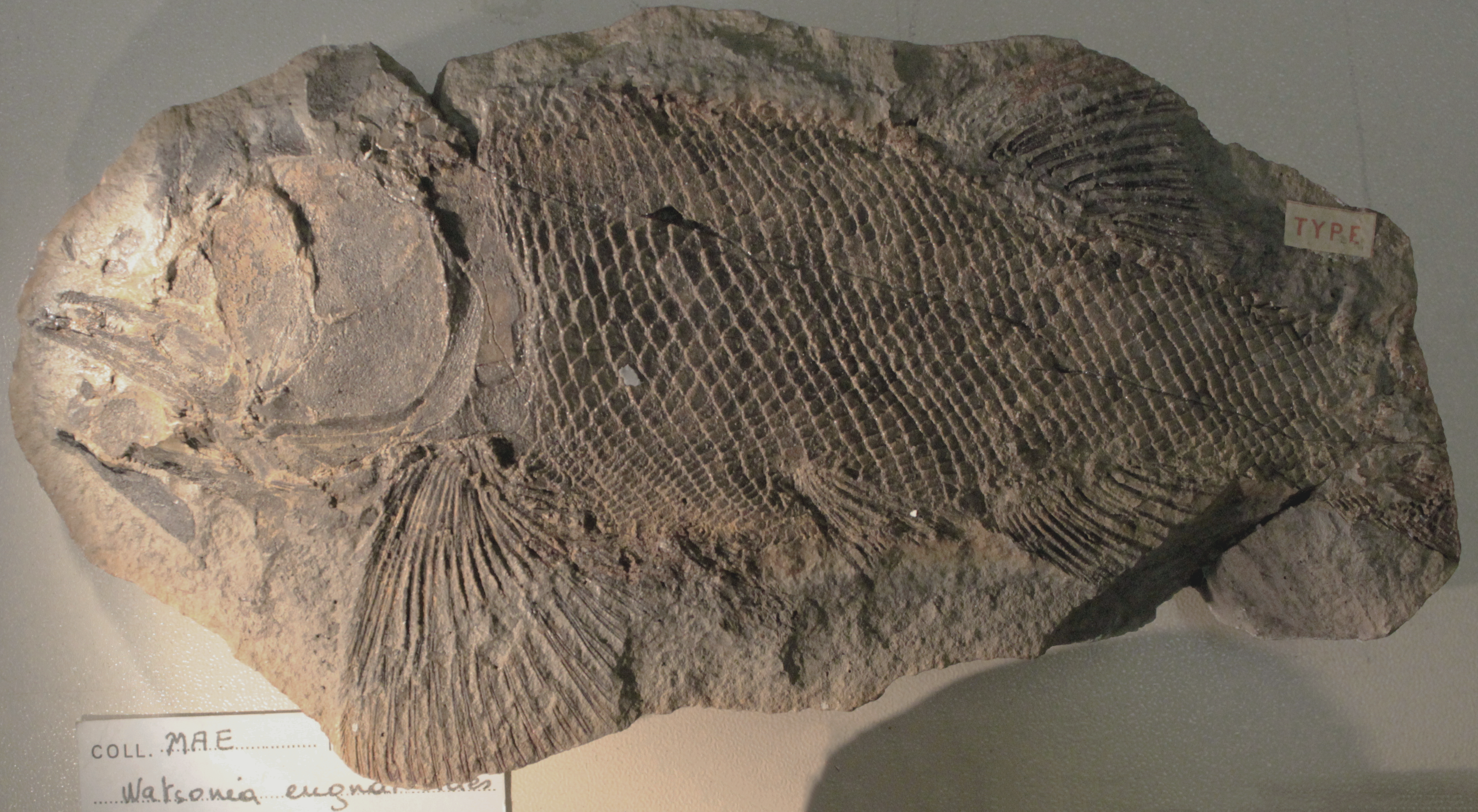
Early Triassic parasemionotiform Watsonulus is an early neopterygian.

Early in their evolution, neopterygians were a very successful group of fish, because they could move more rapidly than their ancestors. Their scales and skeletons began to lighten during their evolution, and their jaws became more powerful and efficient. While electroreception and the ampullae of Lorenzini are present in all other extant groups of fish (except for hagfish), neopterygians have lost this sense, even if it has later re-evolved within Gymnotiformes and catfishes, which possess non-homologous teleost ampullae.

Only a few changes occurred during the evolution of neopterygians from the earlier actinopterygians. However, a very important step in the evolution of neopterygians is the acquisition of a better control of the movements of both dorsal and anal fins, resulting in an improvement in their swimming capabilities. They additionally acquired several modifications in the skull, which allowed the evolution of different feeding mechanisms and consequently the colonization of new ecological niches. All of these characters represented major improvements, resulting in Neopterygii becoming the dominant group of fishes (and, thus, taxonomically of vertebrates in general) today.

The great diversity of extant teleosts has been linked to a whole genome duplication event during their evolution.

== Classification ==
- Order †Pholidopleuriformes
- Order †Redfieldiiformes
- Order †Platysiagiformes
- Order †Polzbergiiformes
- Order †Perleidiformes
- Order †Louwoichthyiformes
- Order †Peltopleuriformes
- Order †Luganoiiformes
- Order †Pycnodontiformes
- Infraclass Holostei
  - Clade Halecomorphi
    - Order †Parasemionotiformes
    - Order †Panxianichthyiformes
    - Order †Ionoscopiformes
    - Order Amiiformes, the bowfin
  - Clade Ginglymodi
    - Order †?Dapediiformes
    - Order †Semionotiformes
    - Order Lepisosteiformes, the gars
- Clade Teleosteomorpha
  - Order †Prohaleciteiformes
  - Division Aspidorhynchei
    - Order †Aspidorhynchiformes
    - Order †Pachycormiformes
- Infraclass Teleostei
  - Order †?Araripichthyiformes
  - Order †?Ligulelliiformes
  - Order †Pholidophoriformes
  - Order †Dorsetichthyiformes
  - Order †Leptolepidiformes
  - Order †Crossognathiformes
  - Order †Ichthyodectiformes
  - Order †Tselfatiiformes
  - Superorder Osteoglossomorpha
    - Order †Lycopteriformes
    - Order Osteoglossiformes, the bony-tongued fishes
    - Order Hiodontiformes, including the mooneye and goldeye
  - Superorder Elopomorpha
    - Order Elopiformes, including the ladyfishes and tarpon
    - Order Albuliformes, the bonefishes
    - Order Notacanthiformes, including the halosaurs and spiny eels
    - Order Anguilliformes, the true eels
    - Order Saccopharyngiformes, including the gulper eel
  - Superorder Clupeomorpha
    - Order †Ellimmichthyiformes
    - Order Clupeiformes, including herrings and anchovies
  - Superorder Ostariophysi
    - Order †Sorbininardiformes
    - Order Gonorynchiformes, including the milkfishes
    - Order Cypriniformes, including barbs, carp, danios, goldfishes, loaches, minnows, rasboras
    - Order Characiformes, including characins, pencilfishes, hatchetfishes, piranhas, tetras.
    - Order Gymnotiformes, including electric eels and knifefishes
    - Order Siluriformes, the catfishes
  - Superorder Lepidogalaxii
    - Order Lepidogalaxiiformes, the salamanderfish
  - Superorder Protacanthopterygii
    - Order Argentiniformes, including the barreleyes and slickheads (formerly in Osmeriformes)
    - Order Salmoniformes, including salmon, Arctic char, and trout
    - Order Esociformes, the pikes and mudminnows
    - Order Galaxiiformes, the galaxiids
    - Order Osmeriformes, including the smelts
  - Superorder Stenopterygii (may belong in Protacanthopterygii)
    - Order Ateleopodiformes, the jellynose fish
    - Order Stomiiformes, including the bristlemouths and marine hatchetfishes
  - Superorder Cyclosquamata (may belong in Protacanthopterygii)
    - Order Aulopiformes, including the Bombay duck, tripod fish, and lancetfishes
  - Superorder Scopelomorpha
    - Order Myctophiformes, including the lanternfishes
  - Superorder Lampridiomorpha
    - Order Lampriformes, including the oarfish, opah and ribbonfishes
  - Superorder Polymyxiomorpha
    - Order †Pattersonichthyiformes
    - Order †Ctenothrissiformes
    - Order Polymixiiformes, the beardfishes
  - Superorder Paracanthopterygii
    - Order Percopsiformes, including the cavefishes and trout-perches
    - Order †Sphenocephaliformes
    - Order Batrachoidiformes, the toadfishes
    - Order Lophiiformes, including the anglerfishes
    - Order Gadiformes, including cods
    - Order Ophidiiformes, including the pearlfishes
  - Superorder Acanthopterygii
    - Order Trachichthyiformes, including slimeheads and fangtooths
    - Order Beryciformes, including alfonsinos and pineconefishes
    - Series Percomorpha 40% of all fish including anabantids, bass, cichlids, gobies, gouramis, mackerel, perches, scats, whiting, wrasses
