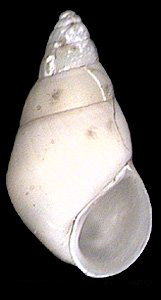
- Apertural view of a shell of Hydrobia ulvae

Scientific classification
- Kingdom: Animalia
- Phylum: Mollusca
- Class: Gastropoda
- Subclass: Caenogastropoda
- Order: Littorinimorpha
- Family: Hydrobiidae
- Genus: Hydrobia; Hartmann, 1821

Synonyms
- Hydrobia (Littorinella) Herrmannsen, 1847; Leachia Risso, 1826 (Rejected name (ICZN Opinion 2161), preoccupied by Leachia Lesueur, 1821 [Cephalopoda]); Litorinella Braun, 1843; Peringia Paladilhe, 1874

= Hydrobia =

Genus of gastropods

Hydrobia is a genus of very small brackish water snails with a gill and an operculum, aquatic gastropod mollusks in the family Hydrobiidae.

== Species ==
Species within the genus Hydrobia include:

- † Hydrobia abbreviata (Grateloup, 1827)
- † Hydrobia acheila Brusina, 1902
- Hydrobia aciculina (Bourguignat, 1876)
- Hydrobia acuta (Draparnaud, 1805)
  - subspecies Hydrobia acuta neglecta Muus, 1963 - synonym: Hydrobia neglecta Muus, 1963
- † Hydrobia acutecarinata Neumayr in Neumayr & Paul, 1875
- † Hydrobia aitai Jekelius, 1932
- † Hydrobia alpha Jekelius, 1944
- † Hydrobia alutae Jekelius, 1932
- † Hydrobia andreaei Boettger in Degrange-Touzin, 1892
- † Hydrobia andrussowi Hilber, 1897
- Hydrobia antarctica Philippi, 1868
- † Hydrobia aquitanica Degrange-Touzin, 1892
- † Hydrobia atropida Brusina, 1892
- † Hydrobia aturensis Noulet, 1854
- † Hydrobia aurita Neumayr in Neumayr & Paul, 1875
- † Hydrobia avisanensis Fontannes, 1877
- † Hydrobia baltici Brusina, 1902
- † Hydrobia banatica Jekelius, 1944
- † Hydrobia barzaviae Jekelius, 1932
- † Hydrobia bathyomphala Brusina, 1902
- † Hydrobia bialozurkensis (Montpéreux, 1831)
- † Hydrobia bicristata Simionescu & Barbu, 1940
- † Hydrobia brusinai Wenz, 1919
- † Hydrobia caerulescens (Gmelin, 1791)
- † Hydrobia calderoni Royo Gómez, 1922
- † Hydrobia carinata Gillet & Geissert, 1971
- † Hydrobia cestasensis Cossmann & Peyrot, 1918
- † Hydrobia cingulata Capellini, 1880
- † Hydrobia cubillensis (Almera & Bofill y Poch, 1895)
- † Hydrobia detracta Jekelius, 1944
- † Hydrobia ditropida Brusina, 1892
- Hydrobia djerbaensis Wilke, Pfenninger & Davis, 2002
- † Hydrobia dollfusi Wenz, 1913
- † Hydrobia draparnaldii (Nyst, 1836)
- † Hydrobia dubuissoni (Bouillet, 1834)
- † Hydrobia effusa (Frauenfeld in Hörnes, 1856)
- † Hydrobia enikalensis Kolesnikov, 1935
- † Hydrobia euryomphala (Bourguignat, 1876)
- † Hydrobia falsani (Fontannes, 1876)
- † Hydrobia fischeri (Hermitte, 1879)
- † Hydrobia fraasi (Blanckenhorn, 1897)
- † Hydrobia frauenfeldi (Hörnes, 1856)
- † Hydrobia friedbergi Simionescu & Barbu, 1940
- † Hydrobia gibba (Braun in Walchner, 1851)
- † Hydrobia girondica Boettger in Degrange-Touzin, 1892
- Hydrobia glaucovirens (Melvill & Ponsonby, 1896)
- Hydrobia glyca (Servain, 1880)
- † Hydrobia gracilis (Rolle, 1860)
- † Hydrobia grandis Cobălcescu, 1883
- † Hydrobia gregaria (Schlotheim, 1820)
- † Hydrobia hermitei Wenz, 1919
- † Hydrobia hoernesi Friedberg, 1923
- † Hydrobia inflata (Pusch, 1837)
- Hydrobia knysnaensis (Krauss, 1848)
- † Hydrobia kubanica Zhizhchenko, 1936
- Hydrobia lactea (Küster, 1852)
- † Hydrobia limnicola (Rolle, 1860)
- † Hydrobia lineata Jekelius, 1944
- † Hydrobia longaeva Neumayr in Neumayr & Paul, 1875
- † Hydrobia metochiana Pavlović, 1932
- † Hydrobia minutissima (Grateloup, 1838)
- † Hydrobia moesiacensis Jekelius, 1944
- † Hydrobia morasensis Fontannes, 1883
- † Hydrobia morgani Morgan, 1920
- † Hydrobia mucronata Jekelius, 1944
- † Hydrobia nannacus Kadolsky, 2008
- † Hydrobia obtusa (Sandberger, 1858)
- † Hydrobia onuri Taner, 1974
- † Hydrobia paludinaria (Schlotheim, 1820)
- † Hydrobia peregrina Boettger, 1901
- † Hydrobia pisana Wenz, 1924
- † Hydrobia planata (Montpéreux, 1831)
- † Hydrobia podolica Łomnicki, 1886
- † Hydrobia politioanei Jekelius, 1944
- † Hydrobia polytropida Brusina, 1892
- † Hydrobia pontilitoris Wenz, 1942
- † Hydrobia procera (Mayer, 1864)
- † Hydrobia protracta (Eichwald, 1853)
- † Hydrobia pseudocaspia Sinzov in Davitashvili, 1932
- † Hydrobia pseudocornea Brusina, 1902
- † Hydrobia punctum (Eichwald, 1853)
- † Hydrobia pupa (Sacco, 1895)
- † Hydrobia pupula Brusina, 1874
- † Hydrobia radmanyestensis Wenz, 1925
- † Hydrobia reinachi Boettger in Reinach, 1894
- † Hydrobia rhodiensis Tournouër in Fischer, 1877
- † Hydrobia romani Royo Gómez, 1922
- † Hydrobia rossii Brusina, 1878 †
- † Hydrobia royoi Robles & Goy, 1972
- † Hydrobia sacyi Cossmann & Peyrot, 1918
- † Hydrobia santrici Pavlović, 1935
- † Hydrobia schlosseri Royo Gómez, 1928
- † Hydrobia semiconvexa Sandberger, 1875
- † Hydrobia septemlineata Łomnicki, 1886
- † Hydrobia simplex (Fuchs, 1877)
- † Hydrobia sinjana Brusina, 1897
- † Hydrobia slavonica Brusina, 1874
- † Hydrobia soceni Jekelius, 1944
- † Hydrobia spicula Ștefănescu, 1896
- † Hydrobia stavropoliana Zhizhchenko, 1936
- † Hydrobia striatella (Grateloup, 1838)
- † Hydrobia subconoidalis Morgan, 1920
- † Hydrobia subprotracta Zhizhchenko, 1936
- † Hydrobia substriatula Sinzov, 1880
- † Hydrobia subsuturata Jekelius, 1944
- † Hydrobia subventrosa Gottschick, 1921
- † Hydrobia sulculata Sandberger, 1875
- † Hydrobia syrmica Neumayr in Neumayr & Paul, 1875
- † Hydrobia tarchanensis Zhizhchenko, 1936
- † Hydrobia timisiensis Jekelius, 1944
- † Hydrobia tournoueri Sandberger, 1875
- † Hydrobia trochulus Sandberger, 1875
- † Hydrobia turrita (Grateloup, 1827)
- † Hydrobia uiratamensis Kolesnikov, 1935
- † Hydrobia vitrella Ștefănescu, 1896

Species brought into synonymy

- Hydrobia anatolica Schütt, 1965: synonym of Graecoanatolica anatolica (Schütt, 1965)
- Hydrobia atuca Boeters, 1988: synonym of Ecrobia ventrosa (Montagu, 1803)
- Hydrobia caliginosa Gould, 1849: synonym of Laevilitorina caliginosa (Gould, 1849)
- Hydrobia compacta Jeffreys, 1884 : synonym of Barleeia gougeti (Michaud, 1830)
- Hydrobia costaricensis Mörch, 1860: synonym of Aroapyrgus costaricensis (Mörch, 1860)
- † Hydrobia elongata carinulata Wenz, 1913: synonym of † Hydrobia gregaria (Schlotheim, 1820)
- Hydrobia eutrepha Paladilhe, 1867: synonym of Bythinella eutrepha (Paladilhe, 1867)
- Hydrobia georgiana Pfeffer, 1886: synonym of Eatoniella georgiana (Pfeffer, 1886)
- Hydrobia jenkinsi E. A. Smith, 1889: synonym of Potamopyrgus antipodarum (Gray, 1843)
- Hydrobia joossei van Aartsen, Menkhorst & Gittenberger, 1984: synonym of Hydrobia glyca (Servain, 1880)
- Hydrobia limosa (Preston, 1915) : synonym of Littoridina limosa Preston, 1915
- Hydrobia longiscata (Bourguignat, 1856) : synonym of Semisalsa longiscata (Bourguignat, 1856)
- Hydrobia maritima Milaschewitsch, 1916: synonym of Ecrobia maritima (Milaschewitsch, 1916)
- Hydrobia miliacea G. Nevill, 1880: synonym of Gangetia miliacea (G. Nevill, 1880)
- Hydrobia minuta Totten : synonym of Ecrobia truncata (Vanatta, 1924)
- Hydrobia neglecta Muus, 1963: synonym of Hydrobia acuta neglecta Muus, 1963
- Hydrobia pamphylica Schütt, 1964: synonym of Graecoanatolica pamphylica (Schütt, 1964)
- Hydrobia pontieuxini Radoman, 1973: synonym of Ecrobia maritima (Milaschewitsch, 1916)
- Hydrobia procerula (Paladilhe, 1869): synonym of Hydrobia acuta acuta (Bourguignat, 1805)
- Hydrobia pumilio E. A. Smith, 1875: synonym of Laevilacunaria antarctica (Martens, 1885)
- Hydrobia salsa (Pilsbry, 1905): synonym of Spurwinkia salsa (Pilsbry, 1905)
- Hydrobia scamandri (Boeters, Monod & Vala, 1977): synonym of Semisalsa stagnorum (Gmelin, 1791)
- Hydrobia seemani Frauenfeld, 1863: synonym of Tryonia seemani (Frauenfeld, 1863)
- Hydrobia stagnalis Baster, 1765 : synonym of Heleobia stagnorum (Gmelin, 1791)
- Hydrobia stagnorum (Gmelin, 1791) : synonym of Heleobia stagnorum (Gmelin, 1791)
- Hydrobia steinii Martens, 1858: synonym of Marstoniopsis steinii (Martens, 1858)
- Hydrobia striata (d'Orbigny, 1840): synonym of Onoba amissa Ponder & Worsfold, 1994
- Hydrobia totteni Morrison, 1954 : synonym of Ecrobia truncata (Vanatta, 1924)
- Hydrobia truncata (Vanatta, 1924): synonym of Ecrobia truncata (Vanatta, 1924)
- Hydrobia turbinata Petterd, 1889: synonym of Ascorhis victoriae (Tenison-Woods, 1878)
- Hydrobia ulvae (Pennant, 1777): synonym of Peringia ulvae (Pennant, 1777)
- Hydrobia vegorriticola Schütt, 1962: synonym of Graecoanatolica vegorriticola (Schütt, 1962)
- Hydrobia ventrosa (Montagu, 1803) : synonym of Ecrobia ventrosa (Montagu, 1803)
- Hydrobia victoriae (Tenison-Woods, 1878): synonym of Ascorhis victoriae (Tenison-Woods, 1878)
