= M. americanus =

M. americanus may refer to:

- Menticirrhus americanus, a kingcroaker species in the genus Menticirrhus
- Mergus americanus, a duck species, now a subspecies of the common merganser
- Merops americanus, a bee eater from the Philippines
- Metasiro americanus, a harvestman species in the genus Metasiro
- Monomitopus americanus, an eel species in the genus Monomitopus
- Morone americanus, a bass species

== See also ==
- Americanus (disambiguation)
