= Victor Thiollière =

French civil engineer, geologist and paleoichthyologist

Victor Joseph de l'Isle Thiollière (28 May 1801 – 14 May 1859) was a French civil engineer, geologist and paleoichthyologist.

He was born in Saint-Étienne. He conducted studies of fossils found in the calcareous limestone at the Cerin quarry, located 80 kilometers east of Lyon, from which, he described numerous paleoichthyological species. He is the taxonomic authority of the genera Holochondrus, Spathobatis, Belemnobatis and Phorcynis. The feather star species Solanocrinites thiollieri was named after him by paleontologist Perceval de Loriol. He died in Lyon.

His family donated his collection of fossils to the Muséum de Lyon, comprising 1702 items primarily from the Rhône-Alpes region, with 699 coming from the Cerin deposit (30 holotypes).

He is credited with creating the first geological map of the Rhône department, which he presented to the Société d'agriculture de Lyon, an organization that he became a member of in 1848. He was also a member of the Académie des sciences, belles-lettres et arts de Lyon (1848–1859) and the Société linnéenne de Lyon (1850–1858).

== Selected works ==
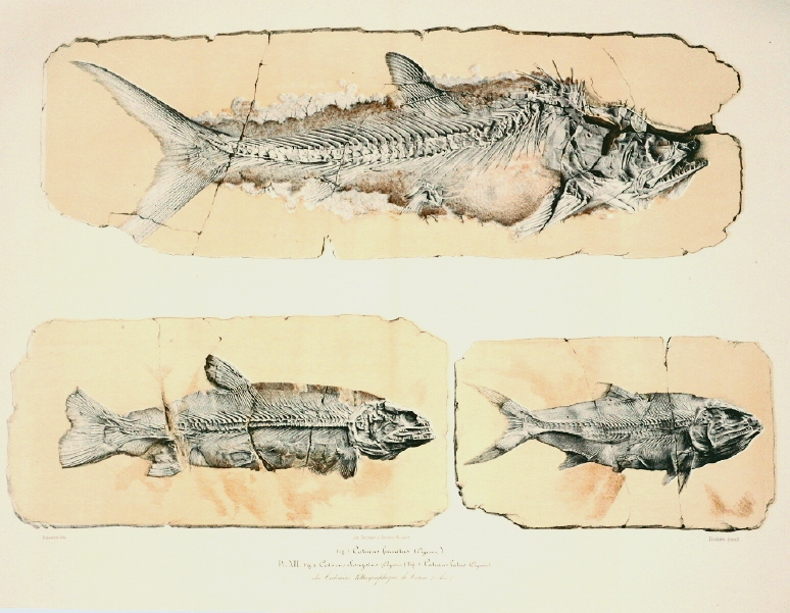
A plate from Descriptions des poissons fossiles provenant des gisements coralliens du Jura dans le Bugey by Thiollière.

- Sur un nouveau gisement de poissons fossiles, dans le Jura du département de l'Ain, (1850).
- Seconde Notice sur le gisement et sur les corps organisés fossiles des calcaires lithographiques, dans le Jura du département de l'Ain, (1851).
- Descriptions des poissons fossiles provenant des gisements coralliens du Jura dans le Bugey, Paris, Editions J.-B. Baillière, 37 p. (1854). — Part 2 later reviewed and annotated by Paul Gervais with the help of Gaston de Saporta, Albert Falsan and Eugène Dumortier, Lyon, Éditions H. Georg, 1873, p. 7-26.
- Rapport sur un Mémoire de M. Michaud intitulé : "Description des coquilles fossiles découvertes aux environs de Hauterives (Drôme)", et sur le terrain tertiaire où ces coquilles se rencontrent, présenté à la Société impériale d'agriculture, d'histoire naturelle et des arts utiles de Lyon, dans la séance du 15 juin 1855, Lyon, Barret (1855).
- Sur les travaux de la réunion extraordinaire de la Société géologique à Valence, en septembre 1854, communication faite à la Société... d'agriculture et d'histoire naturelle de Lyon. Lyon, Barret. (1855).

== Taxon named in his honor ==
- Diaphus thiollierei, Fowler, 1934 the Thiolliere's lanternfish, is a species of lanternfish found in the Indo-Pacific.
