= Menticirrhus littoralis =

- Gulf whiting photographed by NOAA. Note the single chin barbel, consistent beige coloration, and black upper caudal tip.

Conservation status
- Least Concern (IUCN 3.1)

Scientific classification
- Kingdom: Animalia
- Phylum: Chordata
- Class: Actinopterygii
- Division: Teleostei
- Order: Acanthuriformes
- Family: Sciaenidae
- Genus: Menticirrhus
- Species: M. littoralis

Binomial name
- Menticirrhus littoralis (Holbrook, 1758)

Synonyms
- Umbrina littoralis Holbrook, 1758; Menticirrhus undulatus littoralis Holbrook, 1758

Species of fish

Menticirrhus littoralis, known as the Gulf kingfish, Gulf kingcroaker, Gulf whiting, sea mullet or simply whiting, is a species of bottom-dwelling marine fish in the family Sciaenidae. It can be found in coastal waters of the Western Atlantic, from Virginia to Brazil,, particularly from North Carolina to Florida, with most sightings occurring along the shores of the Gulf of Mexico.

The genus name Menticirrhus comes from the Latin menti- (chin) and -cirrhus (barbel) for the single short protrusion on its chin. Its epithet littoralis, from -litus, is Latin for "of the seashore" as this fish is typically caught from the surf or inshore.

== Description ==
Gulf whiting can grow to about 50 centimetres (20 in). Its appearance is very similar to the Southern kingcroaker (Menticirrhus americanus), albeit with a more solid beige or silvery appearance without dark stripes.

It is distinguished from M. americanus by its more solid beige or silvery color and black dot on the upper caudal tip, sometimes running along the caudal edge. The Brazilian variety of M. littoralis coloration may include much darker or entirely solid black fin tips and extremities. M. americanus can be distinguished by its stripes and lack of black caudal tip.

It is found in places where the seabed is sand or mud, often on sandy beaches. The juveniles can tolerate low salinity levels and are often found in estuaries.

== Uses ==
Menticirrhus littoralis is fished both commercially and by recreational anglers, but is generally considered bycatch. The Florida Fish and Wildlife Conservation Commission classifies Gulf whiting as an unregulated species, and as such recreational anglers are permitted to harvest up to 100 lbs of this species per person per day.

It is considered harmless to humans, docile, and safe to eat if caught from non-polluted waters.
