= Homalometron pallidum =

Scientific classification
- Kingdom: Animalia
- Phylum: Platyhelminthes
- Class: Trematoda
- Order: Plagiorchiida
- Family: Megaperidae
- Genus: Homalometron
- Species: H. pallidum

Binomial name
- Homalometron pallidum Stafford, 1904

Species of fluke

Homalometron pallidum is a species of marine trematodes in the family Megaperidae. It is an endoparasite of the mummichog, Fundulus heteroclitus, a small fish found in brackish water along the east coast of the United States and Canada. It has a complex life cycle and lives inside several different host species at different stages.

== Description ==
The original description of Homalometron pallidum was given by Linton in 1899 and reads:

"Body very minutely spinose, white, translucent; acetabuhuni and oral sucker about same size; outline of body, long oval; neck short, continuous with body; greatest breadth in region of testes, near posterior end; ecaudate; acetabuhum sessile; ranii of intestines simple, elongate; esophagus as long as pharynx; testes, two, in median line behind uterus; seminal vesicle dorsal to ovary and posterior border of acetabulum; ovary between acetabulum and testes, on right side; pharynx, subglobular; genital aperture in front of acetabulum, on median line; vitelline glands lying at posterior end and along sides of body as far

as acetabulum; ova few, relatively large."

"Dimensions of specimen in formalin, given in millimeters: length, 2.72; breadth, anterior 0.43, at acetabulum 0.89, middle 1.07; near posterior 0.36; diameter of oral sucker, 0.26; diameter of acetabulum, 0.29; diameter of ovary, 0.21; diameter of testes, 0.33 and 0.39; ova, 0.11 and 0.07 in the two principal diameters."

Stafford used these diagnostic characteristics when he formally described the species in 1904. He was criticized for doing so in 1907 by German parasitologist Arthur Looss who considered the description insufficient, pointing out that it was not possible to use this description to distinguish this species from other similar parasitic trematodes.

== Distribution ==
Homalometron pallidum is found on the eastern seaboard of Canada and the United States. Its range extends from Prince Edward Island and the Gulf of St. Lawrence southwards to the Gulf of Mexico. It is found in the tidal creeks, estuaries and salt water marshes where its host species occur.

== Life cycle ==
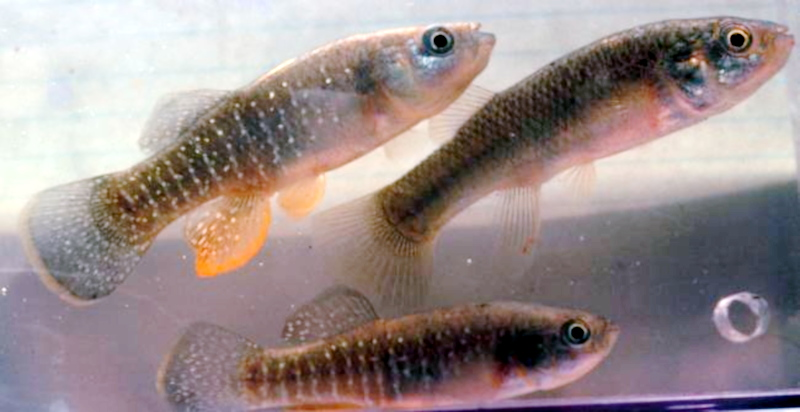
Homalometron pallidum can parasitise mummichogs, pictured

Homalometron pallidum has a complex life cycle involving several host species. The adult worm lives in the gut of a small fish, the mummichog (Fundulus heteroclitus). Eggs are ejected from the host fish in its faeces and are ingested by a small aquatic snail, Hydrobia minuta. This acts as a secondary host. When the eggs hatch, they develop in to rediae. These undergo asexual reproduction and multiply before becoming motile cercariae. The cercariae are few in number and large in size, in comparison to their small gastropod host. They emerge from the snail into the water at night and become free-living. They swim tail first with their body bent round and their tail lashing. They can also crawl with the use of two ventral suckers. They have penetration glands and make their way into an intermediate transfer host. Such hosts can include the amethyst gem clam Gemma gemma, another mummichog, or certain polychaete worms, but not other species of fish. In their new host, the cercariae become metacercariae by encysting in the tissues. In this inactive state, they wait to be ingested by a mummichog. In its gut, they develop into adult worms ready to undergo sexual reproduction and start the cycle again.

Other fish have been identified as also acting as a host to the adult worms, including Menticirrhus saxatilis, Morone americana, Pseudopleuronectes americanus, Tautoga onitis, and Bairdiella chrysura. However, in some of these cases, the worm species could have been improperly identified.
