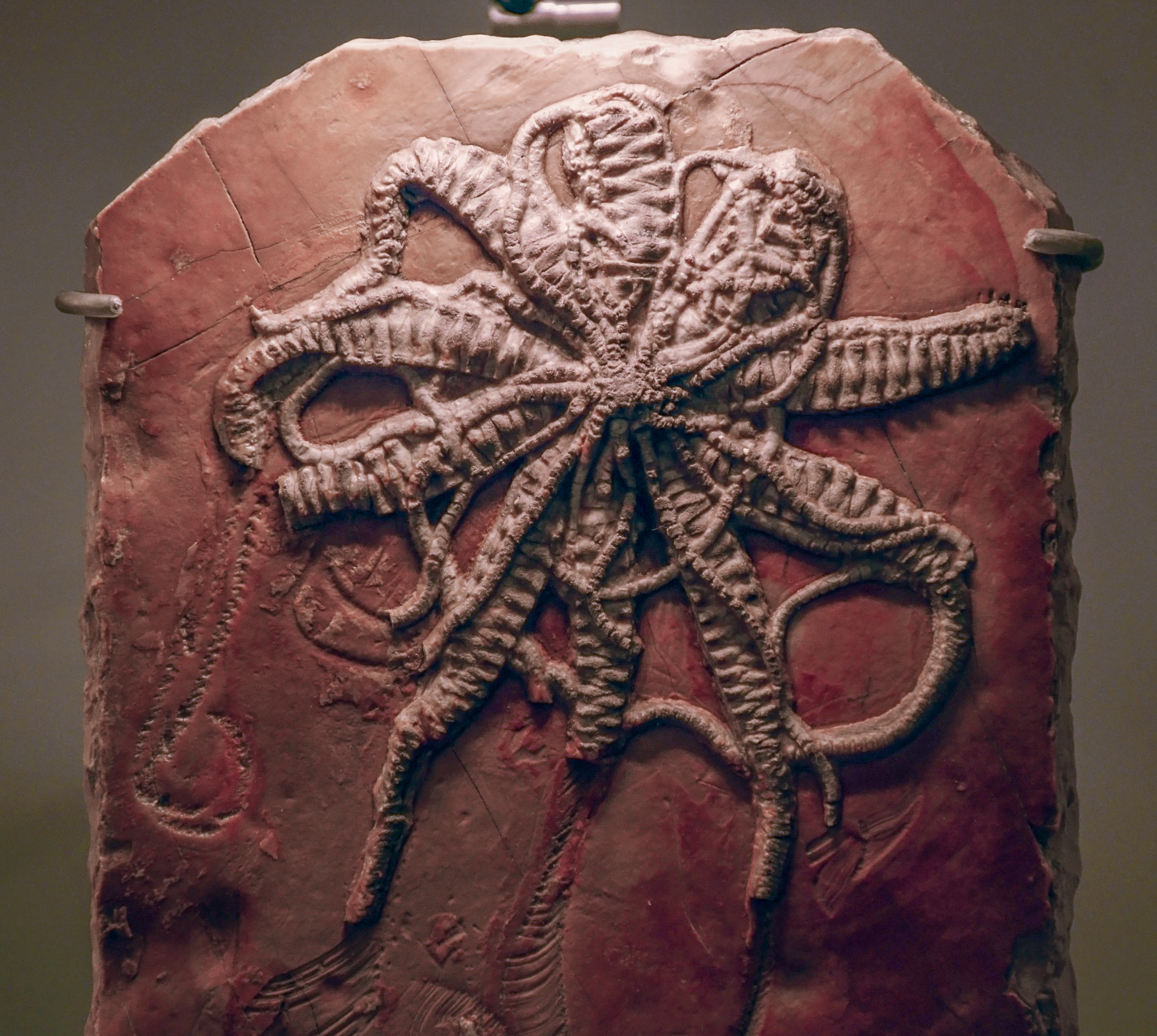

Scientific classification
- Kingdom: Animalia
- Phylum: Echinodermata
- Class: Crinoidea
- Genus: †Solanocrinus; Münster, 1839
- Species: †S. thiollieri

Binomial name
- †Solanocrinus thiollieri Loriol, 1888

= Solanocrinus =

Solanocrinus Temporal range: Late Jurassic to Cretaceous

Extinct genus of crinoids

Solanocrinus thiollieri is an extinct species of crinoids from Jura, France. Like other feather stars, Solanocrinus did not have a stem and was not attached to the ocean floor. Instead, it possessed 22 prehensile tendrils, called "cirri," which it used to grab onto rocks.

Paleontologist Perceval de Loriol named the species after geologist and paleoichthyologist Victor Thiollière in 1895.
