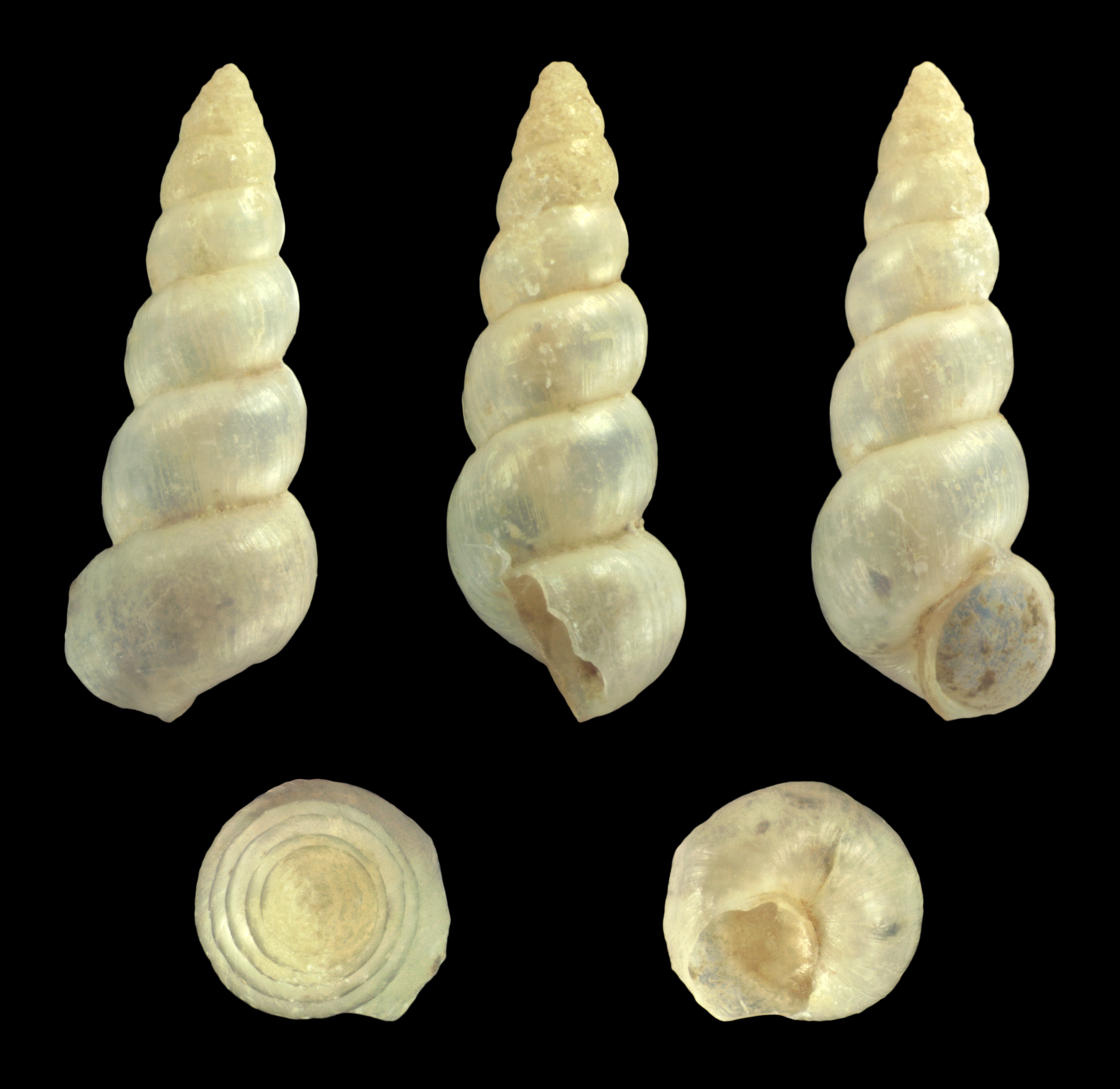

Scientific classification
- Kingdom: Animalia
- Phylum: Mollusca
- Class: Gastropoda
- Subclass: Caenogastropoda
- Order: Littorinimorpha
- Family: Hydrobiidae
- Genus: Hydrobia
- Species: H. acuta

Binomial name
- Hydrobia acuta (Draparnaud, 1805)

= Hydrobia acuta =

Species of gastropod

Hydrobia acuta is a species of very small (4-6mm.) brackish water snail with a gill and an operculum, an aquatic gastropod mollusk in the family Hydrobiidae.

== Description ==
Draparnaud's description reads "Coquille ovale-oblongue, un peu conique, aiguë à son sommet, transparente, lisse, quoique marquée de légères stries lorsqu'on l'observe à la loupe. Dans son naturel elle une couleur verdàtre.La spire a six à sept tours. L'ouverture est ovale et le péristome simple.Fente ombilicale peu prononcée. Opercule mince et lisse. In English "Shell oval-oblong, slightly conical, acute at the top transparent, smooth, albeit marked with light streaks when it is observed under the microscope. In nature it is a greenish colour.The spire has six or seven whorls. The opening is oval and the peristome is simple.Little pronounced umbilical slot.Operculum thin and smooth.

== Subspecies ==
- Hydrobia acuta neglecta Muus, 1963

== Distribution ==
This species occurs on the coasts of the Mediterranean Sea and Black Sea and, as a rare species in Ireland.
