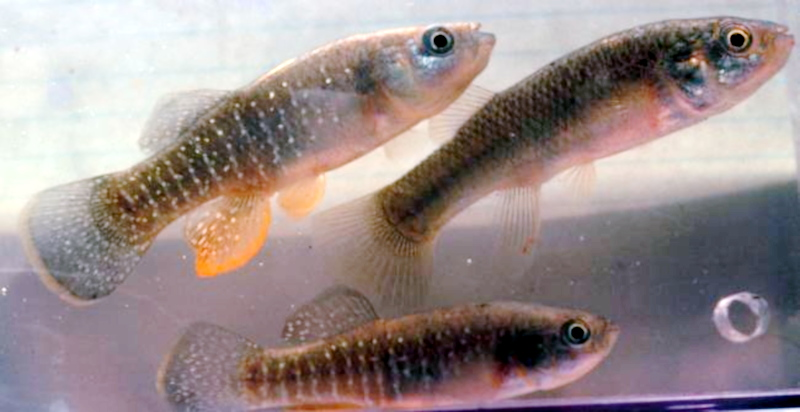

Conservation status
- Least Concern (IUCN 3.1)

Scientific classification
- Kingdom: Animalia
- Phylum: Chordata
- Class: Actinopterygii
- Division: Teleostei
- Order: Cyprinodontiformes
- Family: Fundulidae
- Genus: Fundulus
- Species: F. heteroclitus

Binomial name
- Fundulus heteroclitus (Linnaeus, 1766)

Synonyms
- List: Cobitis heteroclita Linnaeus, 1766; Cobitis macrolepidota Walbaum, 1792; Fundulus mudfish Lacepède, 1803; Esox pisciculus Mitchill, 1815; Esox pisculentus Mitchill, 1815; Fundulus antillarum Fowler, 1916; Fundulus badius Garman, 1895; Fundulus coenicolus (Bloch & Schneider, 1801); Fundulus fasciatus (Bloch & Schneider, 1801); Fundulus fonticola Valenciennes, 1846; Fundulus lozanoi (Gomez Caruana et al., 1984); Fundulus nigrofaciatus (Lesueur, 1817); Fundulus nisorius Cope, 1870; Fundulus ornatus (Lesueur, 1817); Fundulus pisciculus (Mitchill, 1815); Fundulus swampinus (Lacépède, 1803); Fundulus vinctus Jordan & Gilbert, 1882; Fundulus viridescens DeKay, 1842; Fundulus zebra DeKay, 1842; Hydargira nigrofaciata Lesueur, 1817; Hydrargira ornata Lesueur, 1817; Hydrargira swampina Lacepède, 1803; Poecilia coenicola Bloch & Schneider, 1801; Poecilia fasciata Bloch & Schneider, 1801; Valencia lozanoi Gomez Caruana et al., 1984

= Mummichog =

Species of fish

The mummichog (Fundulus heteroclitus) is a small killifish found along the Atlantic coast of the United States and Canada. Also known as Atlantic killifish, mummies, gudgeons, and mud minnows, these fish inhabit brackish and coastal waters, including estuaries and salt marshes. The species is noted for its hardiness and ability to tolerate highly variable salinity, temperature fluctuations from 6 to 35 °C (43 to 95 °F), very low oxygen levels (down to 1 mg/L), and heavily polluted ecosystems. As a result, the mummichog is a popular research subject in embryological, physiological, and toxicological studies. It is also the first fish ever sent to space, aboard Skylab in 1973.

== Taxonomy ==
The genus name Fundulus comes from fundus, meaning bottom, from the fish's habit of swimming near muddy bottoms. The species name heteroclitus means irregular or unusual. The type specimen was first described by Carl Linnaeus in 1766, from near Charleston, South Carolina. Other scientific names now considered synonyms for this species include Cobitis heteroclita, Fundulus fasciatus, Fundulus pisculentus, and Fundulus nigrofasciatus. The mummichog belongs to the order Cyprinodontiformes and the family Fundulidae. There are two subspecies: F. h. heteroclitus (Linnaeus, 1766), in the south and F. h. macrolepidotus (Walbaum, 1792) in the north. As F. mudfish this species was designated the type species of Fundulus when Lacépède created the genus in 1803.

The name mummichog is derived from a Narragansett term meaning "going in crowds", which reflects the mummichog's strong shoaling tendency. Colloquial names include mummy, killie, kelley, chub, salt water minnow, mud minnow, mud dabbler, marsh minnow, brackish water chub, gudgeon, and common killifish. Some of these terms may lead to confusion: the term minnow should be reserved for species of the family Cyprinidae, the mudminnows are members of the family Umbridae, and the name gudgeon is used for various bottom-dwelling species of cyprinid, eleotrid, and ptereleotrid fishes, none of which belongs to the same family as the fundulid mummichog.

== Description ==
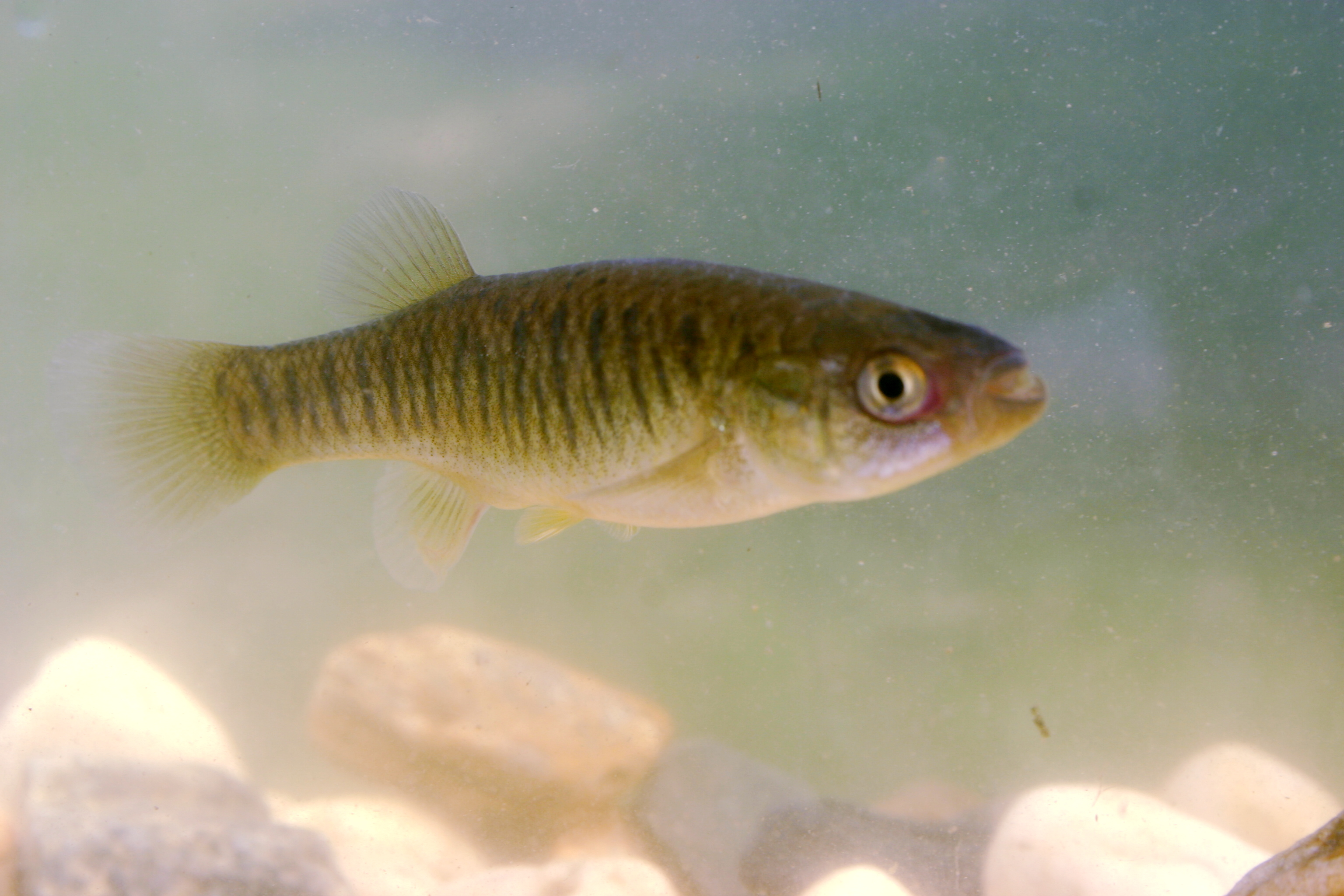
At Saint Michaels, Chesapeake Bay, United States

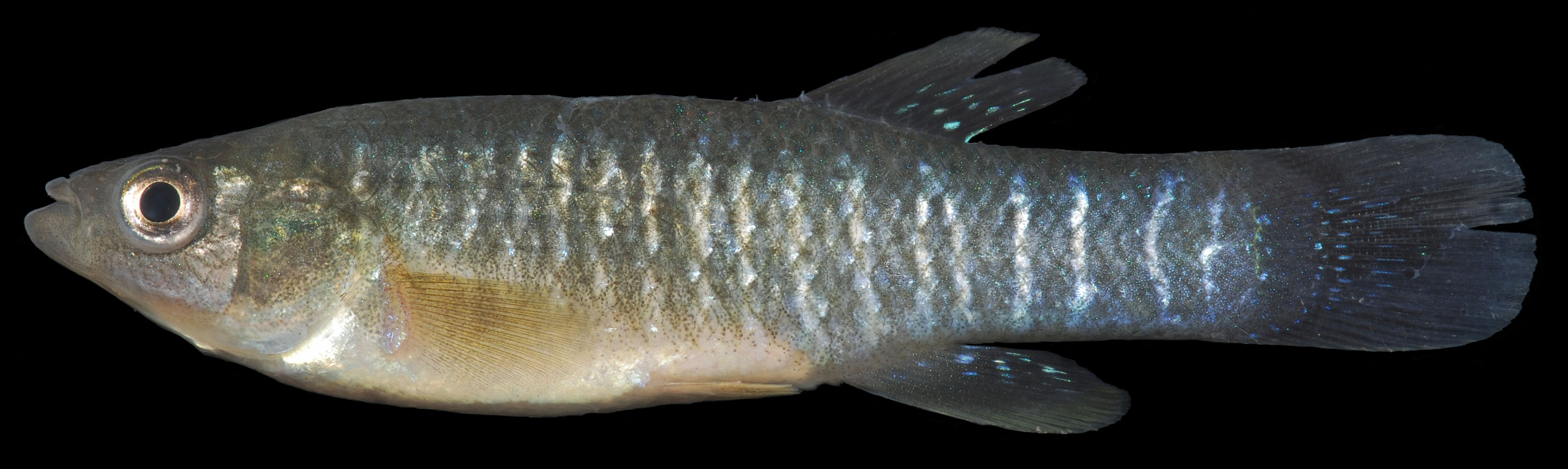
In Maryland

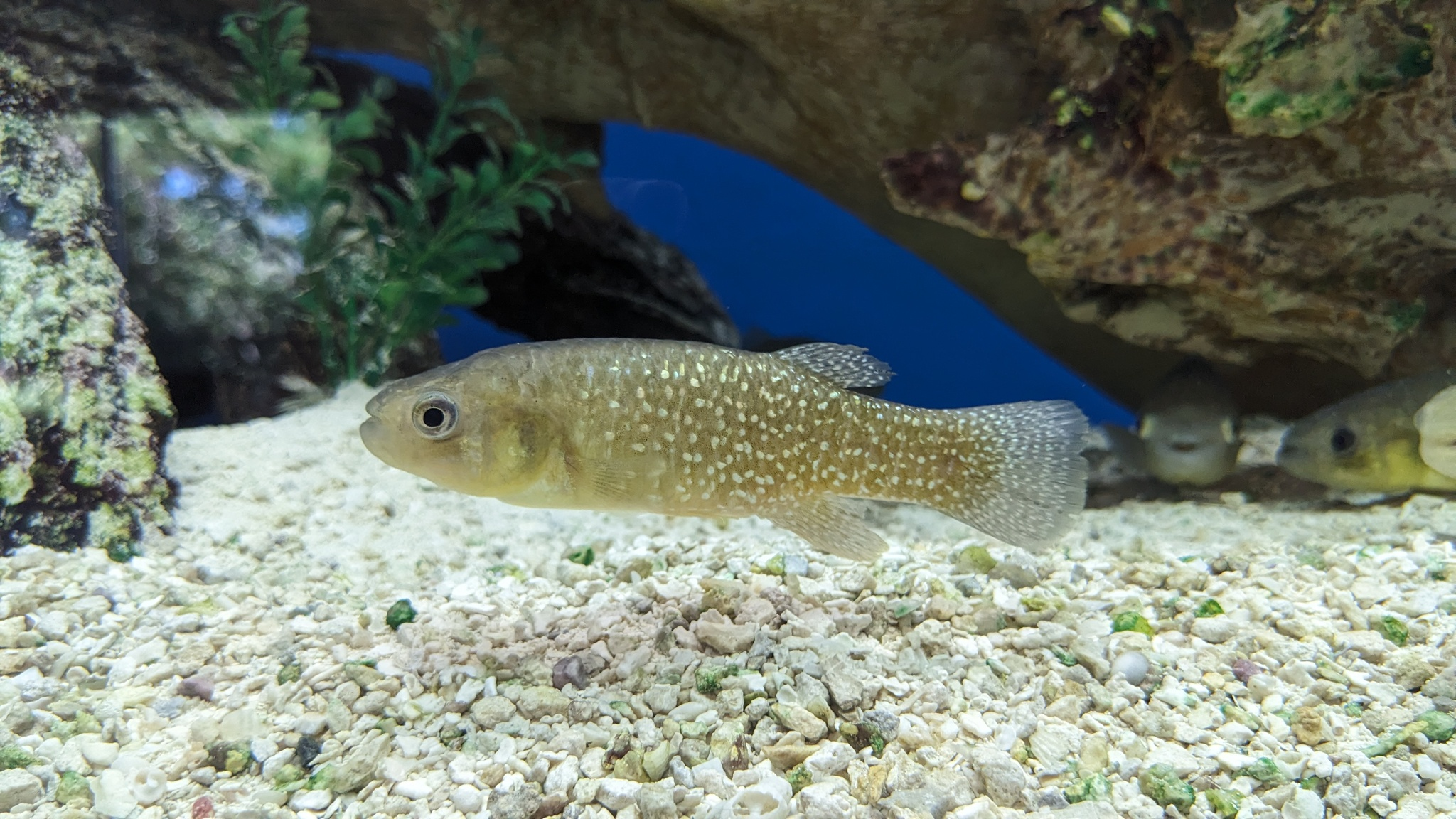
In captivity

The body of the mummichog is elongate but thick, with a deep caudal peduncle. Usual length is 7.5 to 9 cm (3.0 to 3.5 in) but a maximum length of up to 15 cm (5.9 in) is possible. The mouth is upturned and the lower jaw protrudes when the mouth is closed. Pectoral and tail fins are round. Mummichogs have 10–13 dorsal fin rays, 9–12 anal fin rays and 16–20 pectoral fin rays. Males have larger dorsal and anal fins than females. There is no lateral line on the body, but lateral line pores are present on the head. The colour is variable (and may even change in shade within the same individual when placed near different backgrounds) but is generally olive-brown or olive-green. There can be vertical bars on the sides that are thin, wavy, and silvery. Colors are more intense in males during the reproductive season, as they become dark olive-green on the back, steel-blue on the sides with about 15 silvery bars, and yellow or orange-yellow on the underside; the dorsal fin is mottled and a small eyespot may be present near the rear edge. Females tend to be paler, without bars or the intense yellow on the belly, and their dorsal fin is uniformly coloured.

Adults of the two subspecies can be distinguished based on slight morphological and genomic differences. Further, eggs of the northern subspecies have filaments (adhesive chorionic fibrils) that eggs of the southern subspecies lack. While the northern subspecies deposits eggs in the sand, the southern subspecies often deposits eggs inside empty mussel shells.

The mummichog is very similar to the banded killifish, Fundulus diaphanus, and indeed the two species have been known to interbreed. The two species may overlap in their choice of habitat, but in general the banded killifish is more commonly found in freshwater, which is not the case for the mummichog. The banded killifish tends to have thin dark bars on a light side, whereas in the mummichog the bars are thin and light on a dark side. Internally, the banded killifish has 4–7 gill rakers, as opposed to 8–12 in the mummichog.

== Distribution and habitat ==
This species ranges along the Atlantic coast of North America, from Gaspé Peninsula, Anticosti Island and Port au Port Bay in the north to northeastern Florida in the south. It is present on Sable Island, 175 km (109 mi) southeast of the closest point of mainland Nova Scotia in the Atlantic Ocean. The approximate geographical division between the two subspecies lies in New Jersey, Delaware and Virginia.

Introduced populations have become established on the Atlantic coast of Portugal and southwestern Spain, starting in the 1970s and some have now reached the western Mediterranean basin. There may also be introduced populations in Hawaii and the Philippines. As bait fish, mummichogs are sometimes released in freshwater habitats, where they can survive, and there have been reports of individuals in New Hampshire ponds, as well as the upper Ohio River and Beaver River. In the European Union, due to the significant negative impacts of its introduction to the ecosystem, it is included in the list of invasive alien species of Union concern and hence cannot be imported, bred, transported, commercialized, or intentionally released into the environment in any of its member states.

The mummichog is a common fish in coastal habitats such as salt marshes, muddy creeks, tidal channels, brackish estuaries, eelgrass or cordgrass beds, and sheltered shorelines. It can be found within coastal rivers but seldom beyond the head of tide. A few landlocked populations may exist in freshwater lakes close to shore, for example on Digby Neck, Nova Scotia.

== Diet ==
Mummichogs are agastric omnivores. Analyses of their gut contents have found diatoms, amphipods and other crustaceans, molluscs, fish eggs (including their own species), very small fish, insect larvae, and bits of eelgrass.

== Physiology ==
This fish is well known for its ability to withstand a variety of environmental conditions. They can survive temperatures between 6 and 35 °C (43–95 °F); even within the same tidal cycle they can tolerate rapid temperature changes from 15 to 30 °C (59–86 °F). They are able to survive this vast temperature range by altering their metabolic rates at high and low temperatures. This is partly achieved by varying the isoenzyme of the lactate dehydrogenase (Ldh-B) enzyme expressed in warm or cold waters. These two versions of the enzyme allow for faster catalytic function and metabolism depending on if the fish is in northern, colder waters or southern, warmer waters. Based on genetic studies, the enzymes serum esterase (SERE) and malate dehydrogenase (MDH) also appear to play an important role in mummichog temperature control.

They are also among fish species most tolerant of salinity changes (euryhaline). Mummichog larvae can grow in salinities ranging from 0.4 to 100 parts per thousand, the latter being about three times the normal salinity of seawater.

Adult mummichogs tolerate low oxygen levels down to 1 mg/L, at which they resort to aquatic surface respiration (breathing in the surface layer of water, richer in oxygen because of contact with air) to survive. They can even survive for a few hours in moist air outside of water, breathing air directly.

Populations have developed resistance to methylmercury, kepone, dioxins, polychlorinated biphenyl, and polyaromatic hydrocarbons. One study has looked at the genomic variation exhibited by mummichogs populations living in Newark Bay, New Bedford Harbor, and the Elizabeth River (Virginia) (in some areas heavily polluted with polychlorinated biphenyls and creosote, a complex mixture containing dioxin-like chemicals) and has found that about 20% of their genes were modified as compared to populations living in clean sites.

== Behavior ==
Mummichogs live in dense shoals that can include several hundred individuals.

During cold winter months in the northern parts of their range, mummichogs move to upstream tidal pools, where they burrow into the mud at depths up to 20 cm (7.9 in) to overwinter. They can also bury themselves in mud if they are caught in a drying tidal pool between spring tides. Alternatively, they can travel short distances on land to get back to the sea.

In the laboratory, mummichogs have yielded clear examples of free-running circadian rhythms, in both body colour and swimming activity. For the latter, clear rhythms were obtained in single individuals as well as in groups of 5 or 25 individuals. Evidence of free-running semi-lunar rhythms have also been obtained in mummichogs: in constant laboratory conditions, egg production peaked every 14.8 days for up to 5 months.

=== Reproduction ===
Spawning takes place from spring through fall. In the southernmost populations, up to eight spawnings are possible in a season. Spawning takes place most often at high tide and when the moon is new or full. Maximal spawning occurs when high spring tides coincide with night, though spawning during the day remains possible.

During courtship, males may pursue females, and females may attract males by turning on their sides near the bottom and flicking their tails. A male and female may swim together for a while, after which the male crowds the female against a rock or a plant and clasps her: the male's larger dorsal and anal fins curve around the female's body. Fingerlike projections that develop on the male's scales behind and below the dorsal fin may help the male maintain contact with the female. The pair quivers vigorously and eggs and sperm are released.

The eggs are pale yellow, about 2 mm (0.08 in) in diameter, and strongly adhesive. During a spawning event, a female can deposit up to 740 eggs in separate clutches of 10 to 300 eggs at a time. The eggs adhere to plants, algal mats, empty mussel shells, sand, or mud at sites that are reached by water only at high spring tides. Eggs therefore develop while exposed to moist air, and they hatch when the next high spring tides reach them. The eggs cannot hatch in air, nor can they do so in moving water; hatching is initiated by a lack of oxygen, something that can happen in the boundary layer of relatively still water surrounding the metabolically active egg at high tide, but not in air or in moving water.

As opposed to their northern counterparts, the southern subspecies have eggs that lack filaments (adhesive chorionic fibrils) and they often deposit those eggs inside empty mussel shells. The two subspecies are also distinguished based on slight morphological and genomic differences.

Most mummichogs become sexually mature when two years old, around 3.8 cm (1.5 in) in length. Normal lifespan is four years.

== Parasites ==
Mummichogs are hosts to a parasitic fluke, Homalometron pallidum, which has a complex lifecycle involving the aquatic snail, Ecrobia truncata. Other parasite species reported in mummichogs include 10 protozoans, eight trematodes, one nematode, two acanthocephalans, and two crustaceans. A study in New Jersey found that mummichogs heavily infested with the digenean gill parasite Ascocotyle phagicola, spent more time near the surface and exhibited conspicuous behaviors such as jerking, an example of a parasite affecting the behavior of its host in a way beneficial to the parasite, as conspicuous behaviors near the surface make the fish more likely to be noticed by predatory wading birds, the next host in the parasite's life cycle.

== Interest to humans ==
Mummichogs readily eat mosquito larvae and attempts have been made to use them as biocontrol agents of mosquito populations.

=== Scientific utility ===
Mummichogs are considered an important environmental model organism because of their ability to tolerate various extremes of chemical (pollution, etc.) and physical (temperature, salinity, oxygen, etc.) conditions. They are relatively abundant in nature and can be easily captured, transported and reared in laboratory facilities. They are commonly used in scientific studies of stress biology, thermal physiology and toxicology, and have also been studied in the contexts of evolutionary biology, developmental biology, endocrinology, cancer biology, and chronobiology (study of circadian rhythms). With the successful sequencing and assembly of the full killifish genome, they serve as a premier scientific model for studying biochemical and physiological responses to varying environmental conditions.

Their remarkable ability to tolerate various extremes of temperature and salinity has made them popular subjects in scientific studies of toxicology. For decades the killifish has been a useful laboratory model for toxicological studies that include exposures to single chemicals, chemical mixtures, and complex contaminated media. It is sometimes the only fish species found in severely polluted and oxygen-deprived waterways, such as the Elizabeth River in Virginia and, in New Jersey, the Hackensack River and the Arthur Kill. A 2008 Virginia Institute of Marine Science report stated that 38% of mummichogs from Elizabeth River had cancerous lesions, and "more than half had pre-cancerous lesions. That was largely due to high levels of polycyclic aromatic hydrocarbons".

Killifish eggs are used in developmental studies and when teaching embryology because the eyes, the beating heart, and the different stages of ontogenesis can be easily examined. Embryos are also extremely durable and easy to manipulate in the laboratory.

Mummichogs were the first fish sent to space. In 1973 a couple of them were flown in a plastic bag aquarium aboard Skylab, during the Skylab 3 mission. In the absence of gravity the fish at first exhibited an unusual swimming behavior: they constantly pitched forward and therefore described tight circles. However, by day 22 of the mission they swam normally. Fifty eggs at an advanced stage of development had also been taken on board, and 48 of them hatched during the flight. The hatchlings swam normally. More experiments with mummichogs in space followed as part of the Apollo–Soyuz Test Project and as part of a biological package aboard the Bion 3/Kosmos 782 satellite.

== See also ==
- Japanese rice fish (Oryzias latipes), first fish to breed in space in 1994
