= Hydrobia glyca =

Scientific classification
- Kingdom: Animalia
- Phylum: Mollusca
- Class: Gastropoda
- Subclass: Caenogastropoda
- Order: Littorinimorpha
- Family: Hydrobiidae
- Genus: Hydrobia
- Species: H. glyca

Binomial name
- Hydrobia glyca (Servain, 1880)

Synonyms
- Hydrobia joossei van Aartsen, Menkhorst & Gittenberger, 1984

Species of gastropod

Hydrobia glyca is a species of very small aquatic snail, an operculate gastropod mollusk in the family Hydrobiidae.
