= Hydrobia djerbaensis =

Scientific classification
- Kingdom: Animalia
- Phylum: Mollusca
- Class: Gastropoda
- Subclass: Caenogastropoda
- Order: Littorinimorpha
- Family: Hydrobiidae
- Genus: Hydrobia
- Species: H. djerbaensis

Binomial name
- Hydrobia djerbaensis Wilke, Pfenninger & Davis, 2002

Species of gastropod

Hydrobia djerbaensis is a species of small aquatic snail, an operculate gastropod mollusk in the family Hydrobiidae.
