= Ecrobia =

Scientific classification
- Kingdom: Animalia
- Phylum: Mollusca
- Class: Gastropoda
- Subclass: Caenogastropoda
- Order: Littorinimorpha
- Family: Hydrobiidae
- Genus: Ecrobia; Stimpson, 1865

Synonyms
- Ventrosia Radoman, 1977

Genus of snails

Ecrobia is a genus of very small aquatic snails, operculate gastropod mollusks in the family Hydrobiidae.

== Species ==
Species within the genus Ecrobia include:

- Ecrobia grimmi (Clessin & Dybowski, 1888)
- Ecrobia maritima (Milaschewitsch, 1916)
- Ecrobia truncata (Vanatta, 1924)
- Ecrobia ventrosa (Montagu, 1803)

Species brought into synonymy

- Ecrobia pontieuxini (Radoman, 1973): synonym of Ecrobia maritima (Milaschewitsch, 1916)

== Taxonomy ==
Davis et al. (1989: 341-342, 347) suggested that the North American Hydrobia truncata (Vanatta, 1924), the type species of Ecrobia, was introduced from Europe and would then possibly be a synonym of Hydrobia ventrosa which is representative of Ventrosia Radoman, 1977. Even if the species are considered as separate, they are to be considered congeneric and therefore the older name Ecrobia must be given preference over Ventrosia. Haase et al. (2010) use Ecrobia as valid genus.
