= Albert Falsan =

French geologist and glaciologist

Claude Alexandre Albert Falsan (14 May 1833, in Lyon – 12 February 1902, in Saint-Cyr-au-Mont-d'Or) was a French geologist and glaciologist.

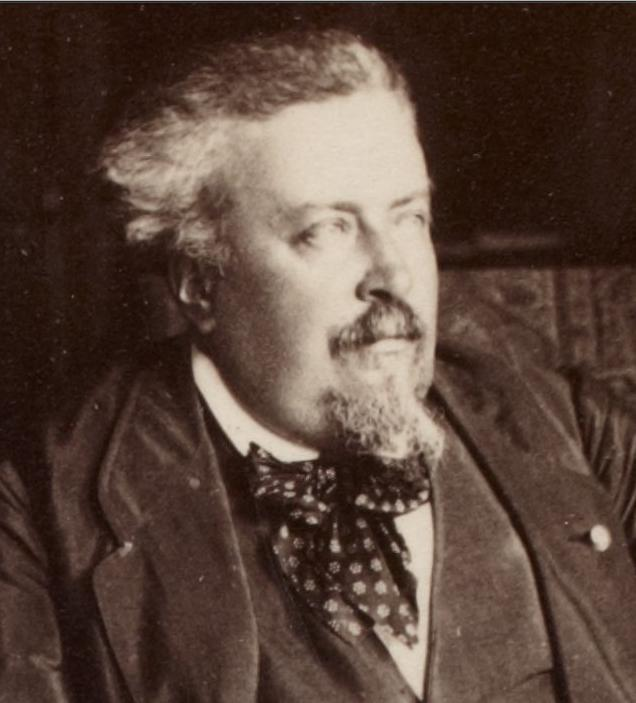
Albert Falsan (1884)

He was a student at the Collège des Minimes and also took classes at the University of Lyon as a pupil of geologist Joseph Jean Baptiste Xavier Fournet. Although he never received a diploma, he dedicated his time and energies to geological research of the Jura, the Lyonnaise region and the Alps.

From 1869 to 1902 he was a member of the Académie des sciences, belles-lettres et arts de Lyon, and in 1873, a founding member of the Société de géographie de Lyon. During his career he also received the following awards and distinctions:

- Lauréat de l'Institut, prix Bordin.
- Grande médaille du Congrès des sociétés savantes.
- Médaille d'or du concours de la Sorbonne, 1880.
- Médaille d'or de l'Académie de Lyon.

== Selected works ==
- Monographie géologique du Mont-d'Or lyonnais et de ses dépendances, 1866 – Geological monograph of Mont-d'Or (Lyon) and outlying areas; with Arnould Locard.
- Note sur les terrains subordonnés aux gisements de poissons et de végétaux fossiles du Bas-Bugey, 1873 – Note on the subordinated deposits of fish and plants in Bas-Bugey; with Eugène Dumortier.
- Monographie géologique des anciens glaciers et du terrain erratique de la partie moyenne du bassin du Rhône, 1875 – Geological monograph on the ancient glaciers and erratic terrain in the middle part of the Rhône basin; with Ernest Chantre.
- Notice sur la vie et les travaux de Théophile Ebray – On the life and work of Théophile Ébray.
- La période glaciaire étudiée principalement en France et en Suisse, 1889 – Glacial age studies, mainly involving France and Switzerland.
- Les Alpes françaises, la flore et la faune, le rôle de l'homme dans les Alpes, la transhumance, 1893 – The French Alps, flora and fauna, the role of humans in the Alps, transhumance.
