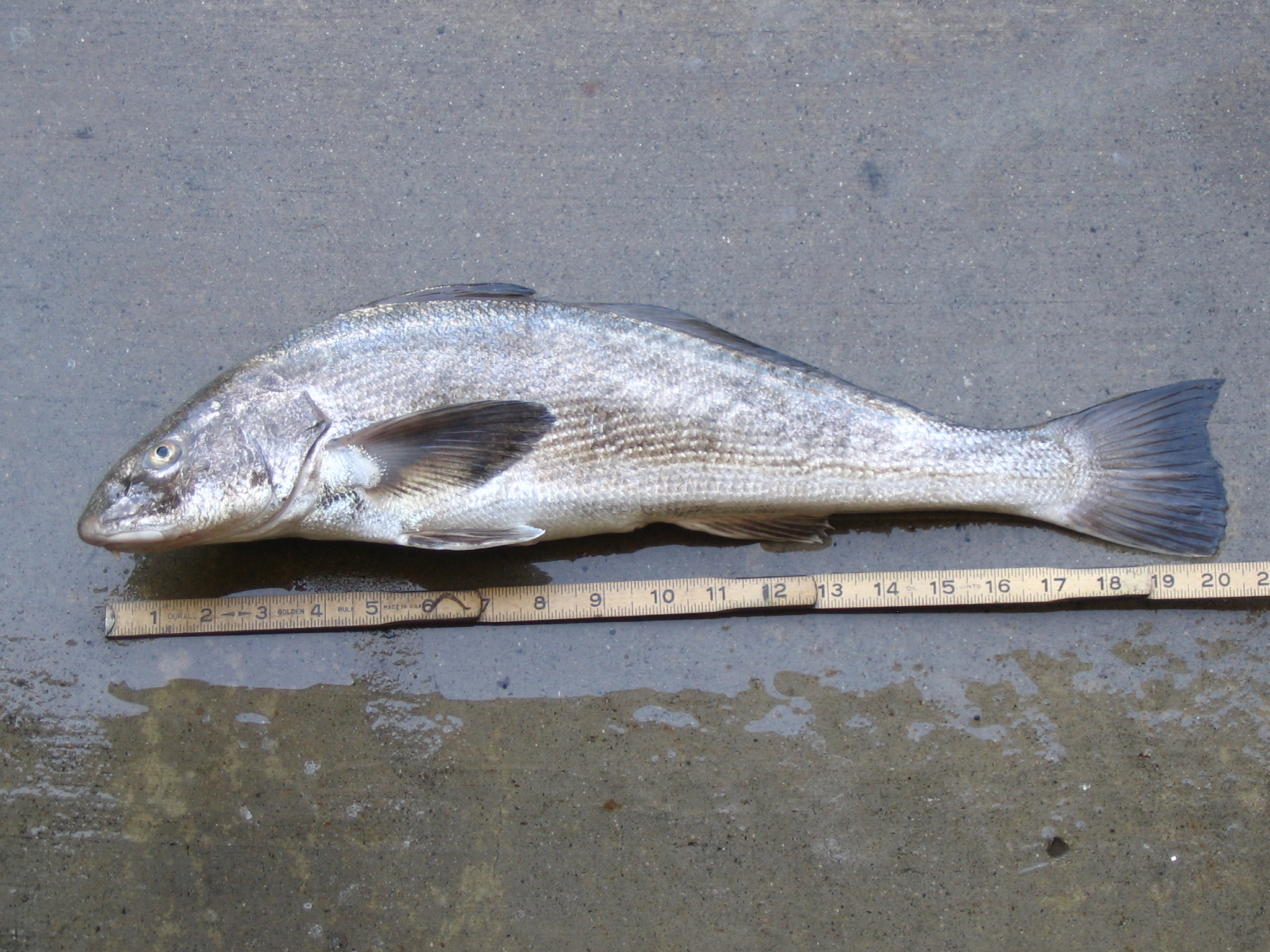

Conservation status
- Data Deficient (IUCN 3.1)

Scientific classification
- Kingdom: Animalia
- Phylum: Chordata
- Class: Actinopterygii
- Order: Acanthuriformes
- Family: Sciaenidae
- Genus: Menticirrhus
- Species: M. undulatus

Binomial name
- Menticirrhus undulatus (Girard, 1854)

= California corbina =

Species of fish

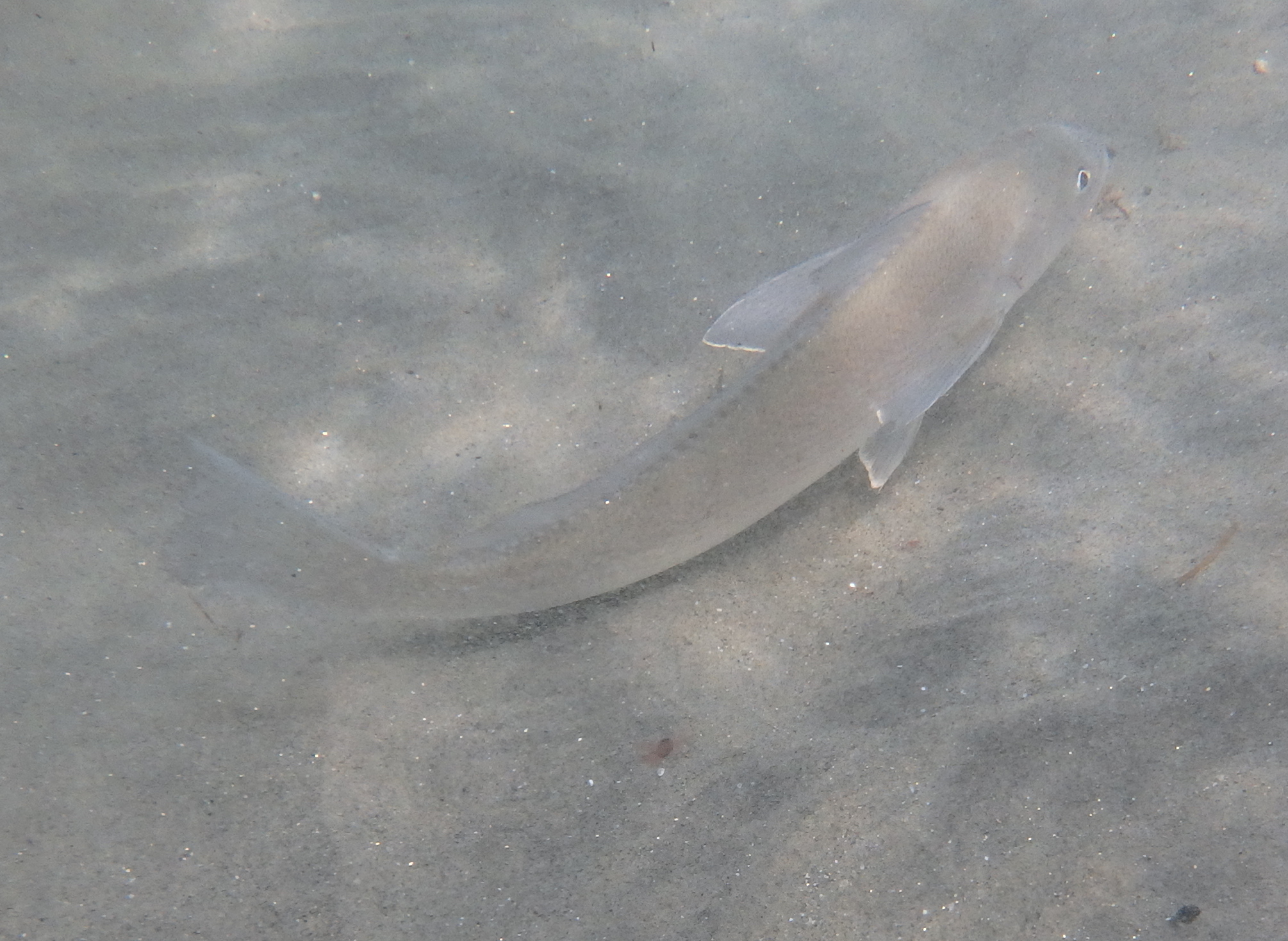
Wild California corbina photographed at La Jolla Shores Beach in San Diego, CA.

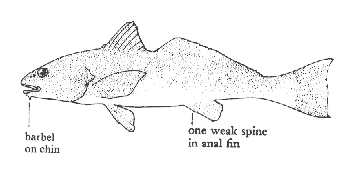
Illustration by California Department of Fish and Wildlife

The California corbina (Menticirrhus undulatus), is a marine demersal fish in the croaker family. It can often be found along sandy beaches and in shallow bays. This species travels in small groups along the surf zone in a few inches of water to depths of 20 meters (66 ft). Other names include "California kingcroaker", "California whiting", and "kingfish".

== Description ==
California corbina are uniformly grey in color with some iridescence and have an elongated and slightly compressed body shape in comparison to other croakers. Like all members of the genus Menticirrhus, the California corbina lacks a swim bladder but is able to produce a croaking sound. It is believed that the loss of the swim bladder evolved to facilitate living in a turbulent environment. This species and the yellowfin croaker are the only two of the eight coastal croakers found in California waters to exhibit a single barbel on the lower jaw. The California corbina's barbel is short and stiff and is used to detect prey. The upper half of the caudal fin has a concave trailing edge, while the lower half trailing edge is convex. The largest recorded specimen was 28 inches (710 mm) and 8.5 pounds.

== Distribution and habitat ==
California corbina is reported to occur from the Gulf of California, Mexico, to Point Conception, California. However, the IUCN questions the extent of the California corbina's southern range due to the presence of similar and easily misidentified species that exist in the Gulf of California.

California corbina are commonly found in the shallow troughs and ditches running parallel sandy beaches and shallow bays up to a depth of 20 meters (66 ft). California corbina are often found in small groups, however, adults have been observed traveling solitarily as well. The California Corbina works the shallows of sandy beaches searching for food in the shallows and seeking cover below the rough white water created by waves.

== Ecology ==
=== Diet ===
The California corbina's diet consists of crustaceans, small fish, bivalves, and other small invertebrates. California corbina have been observed feeding in just a few inches of water in the upper surf. To feed, they scoop up mouthfuls of sand and separate the food by expelling the sand through the gills and spitting out bits of clam shells and other foreign matter.

=== Life cycle ===
Males mature at approximately 2 years of age and a length of about 10 inches and females at age 3 and about 13 inches in length. Spawning extends from June to September, but is heaviest during July and August. The eggs are free floating. Population size, recruitment, and mortality of this species is currently unknown.

== Fisheries ==
The California corbina is targeted by commercial and sport fisheries. California corbina may be caught throughout the year, but fishing reaches its peak in summer and late fall. Due to the fact that California corbina live near shore, they are most often caught by fishermen on beaches, piers, and jetties; not on private boats or fishing vessels. This species is occasionally caught as by-catch by shrimp trawling vessels.

== Conservation status ==
The IUCN has assessed the California corbina as data deficient due to outstanding questions about the species' distribution. There are no known conservation efforts that specifically target the California corbina, however, part of its distribution is protected by various marine protected areas. There has been a decline in catch since the early 2000s, but it is not known if this reflects a decline in population.
