= Hydrobia lineata =

Conservation status
- Least Concern (IUCN 3.1)

Scientific classification
- Kingdom: Animalia
- Phylum: Mollusca
- Class: Gastropoda
- Subclass: Caenogastropoda
- Order: Littorinimorpha
- Family: Hydrobiidae
- Genus: Hydrobia
- Species: H. lineata

Binomial name
- Hydrobia lineata Binder, 1957

Species of gastropod

Hydrobia lineata is a small species of freshwater snail, an aquatic gastropod mollusc in the family Hydrobiidae. This species is native to Côte d'Ivoire, Togo, and Benin. It is found along the coast, and like others in the genus, can tolerate some degree of salt water.
