= Diaphus thiollierei =

Conservation status
- Least Concern (IUCN 3.1)

Scientific classification
- Kingdom: Animalia
- Phylum: Chordata
- Class: Actinopterygii
- Order: Myctophiformes
- Family: Myctophidae
- Genus: Diaphus
- Species: D. thiollierei

Binomial name
- Diaphus thiollierei Fowler, 1934

Species of fish

Diaphus thiollierei, also known as Thiolliere's lanternfish, is a species of lanternfish found in the Indo-Pacific.

== Description ==
This species reaches a length of 10.0 cm (3.9 in).

== Etymology ==
The fish is named in honor of Victor Joseph de l'Isle Thiollière (1801–1859), a French civil engineer, geologist and paleoichthyologist, who reported on the fishes collected by French priest and biologist Xavier Montrouzier (1820–1897) from the Woodlark Archipelago in Papua, New Guinea in 1857
