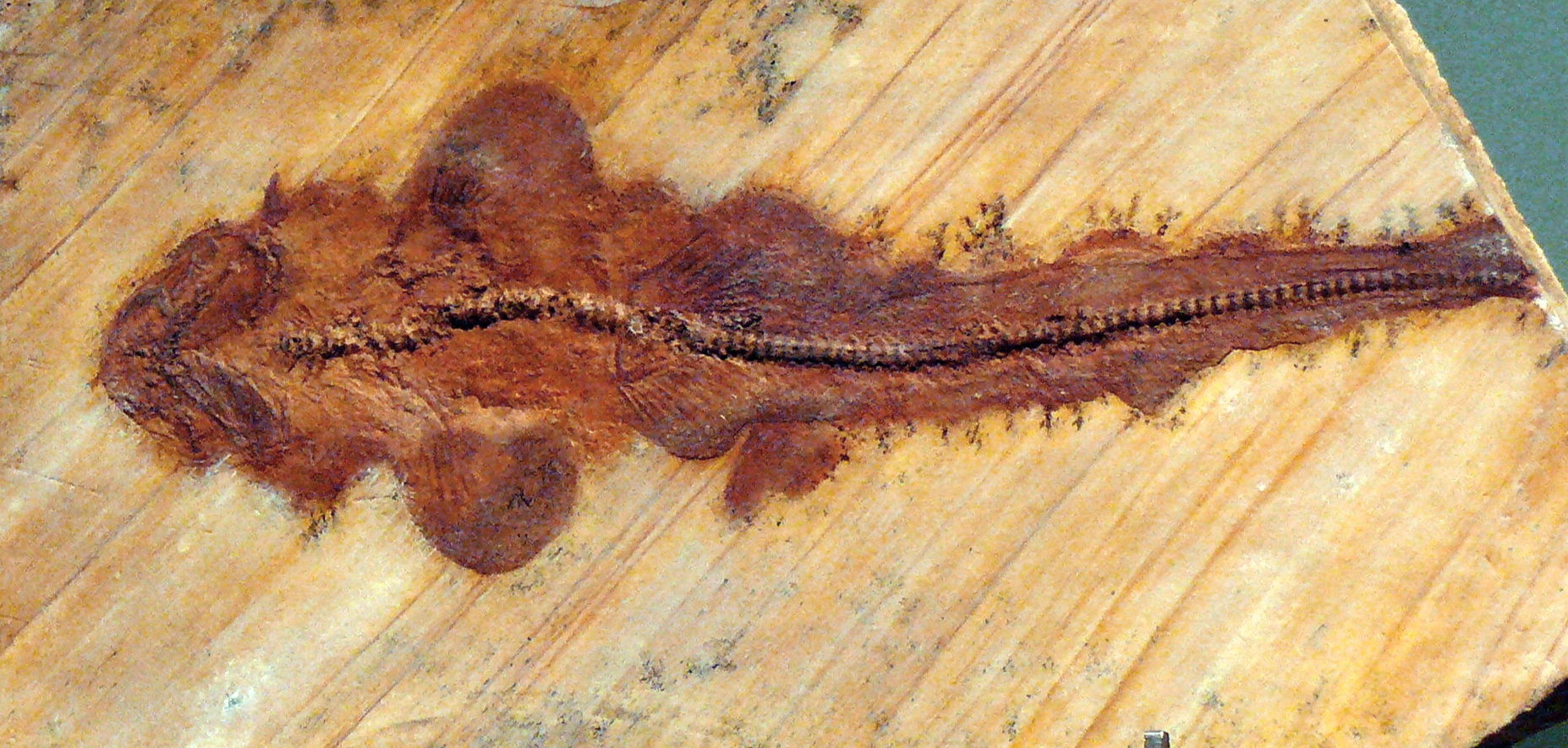
- Phorcynis catulina in the Museum für Naturkunde in Berlin

Scientific classification
- Kingdom: Animalia
- Phylum: Chordata
- Class: Chondrichthyes
- Subclass: Elasmobranchii
- Division: Selachii
- Order: Squatiniformes
- Family: Squatinidae
- Genus: †Phorcynis; Thiollière 1854

= Phorcynis =

Extinct genus of sharks

Phorcynis is an extinct genus of cartilaginous fish. The scales of Phorcynis have elongated crowns with a narrow median keel and short lateral folds and the teeth are asymmetrical, similar to those of Orectolobus.
