= Hydrobia acuta neglecta =

Scientific classification
- Domain: Eukaryota
- Kingdom: Animalia
- Phylum: Mollusca
- Class: Gastropoda
- Subclass: Caenogastropoda
- Order: Littorinimorpha
- Family: Hydrobiidae
- Genus: Hydrobia
- Species: H. acuta
- Subspecies: H. a. neglecta

Trinomial name
- Hydrobia acuta neglecta Muus, 1963

Synonyms
- Hydrobia neglecta Muus, 1963

Subspecies of gastropod

Hydrobia acuta neglecta is a European subspecies of small brackish water snail with a gill and an operculum, an aquatic gastropod mollusc in the family Hydrobiidae.

== Distribution ==
This species which has a distribution type: oceanic temperate occurs on the coasts of the North Sea, in countries and islands including:

- Iceland
- Denmark
- Sweden
- Great Britain
- Ireland
- France

== Ecology ==
Hydrobia acuta neglecta occurs in coastal lagoons where incoming freshwater dilutes sea water. The preferred salinity range is 10-24 ‰.

== Status ==
The status of this taxon is uncertain. Hydrobia neglecta is treated as a full species in Fauna Europaea, but in 1995 it had been suggested that H. neglecta is a synonym of the Mediterranean Hydrobia acuta (Draparnaud). Then a neglecta colony in northern France was shown to be acuta. In 2000 a molecular study concluded that north-west European populations were not specifically distinct from the Mediterranean Hydrobia acuta and designated them subspecies neglecta Muus.
