= Ecrobia maritima =

Scientific classification
- Kingdom: Animalia
- Phylum: Mollusca
- Class: Gastropoda
- Subclass: Caenogastropoda
- Order: Littorinimorpha
- Family: Hydrobiidae
- Genus: Ecrobia
- Species: E. maritima

Binomial name
- Ecrobia maritima (Milaschewitsch, 1916)

Synonyms
- Ventrosia maritima (Milaschewitsch, 1916)

Species of gastropod

Ecrobia maritima is a species of very small aquatic snail, an operculate gastropod mollusk in the family Hydrobiidae.

== Description ==
The size of an adult shell reaches 4 mm.

== Distribution ==
Ecrobia maritima live in Pomorie Lake, a hyperhaline lagoon in eastern Bulgaria. Western Europe, Tunisia, the Peloponnesus and the Corinthian Gulf, all in the Ionian Sea, as well as — shockingly — the Black Sea coast in Romania, are habitats for E. ventrosa. Both the Black Sea and the Aegean Sea have been home to E. maritima.
