= Grigoriu Ștefănescu =

Romanian geologist, mineralogist paleontologist

Grigoriu Ștefănescu (11 February 1836 – 20 February 1911) was a Wallachian-born Romanian geologist, mineralogist paleontologist.

Ștefănescu was elected a titular member of the Romanian Academy in 1876. From 1897 to 1898, he served as rector of the University of Bucharest.
