= Charles-François Fontannes =

French paleontologist and stratigrapher

Charles-François Fontannes, name sometimes given as Francisque Fontannes (1839, Lyon – December 1886) was a French paleontologist and stratigrapher.

He was initially a student of commerce, taking business classes in Germany and England. After accompanying Louis Lortet on a scientific excursion to Greece, he took courses in geology at the University of Lyon and became associated with the natural history museum of Lyon. Since 1888 the "Prix Fontannes" is awarded periodically by the Société géologique de France for the best French work in the field of stratigraphy.

== Published works ==
From 1875 to 1885, in eight installments, he published Études stratigraphiques et paléontologiques pour servir à l'histoire de la période tertiaire dans le bassin du Rhône ("Stratigraphic and paleontological studies associated with the history of the Tertiary era of the Rhône basin"). Other significant works by Fontannes are:

- Déscription des ammonites de la zone à Ammonites tenuilobatus de Crussol (Ardèche), 1876 (with Eugène Dumortier).
- Les mollusques pliocènes de la vallée du Rhône et du Roussillon (2 volumes; 1879, 1883) – Pliocene molluscs from the Rhône Valley and Roussillon.
- Description des ammonites des calcaires du château de Crussol (Ardèche), 1879.
- Note sur les alluvions anciennes des environs de Lyon, 1884 – On ancient alluvium in the environs of Lyon.
- Contribution a la faune malacologique des terrains néogènes de la roumanie, 1886 – Contribution involving malacological fauna from the Neogene strata in Romania.
