= Eugène Dumortier =

French paleontologist

Eugène Dumortier (4 December 1802, in Lyon – 12 August 1876, Lyon) was a French paleontologist.

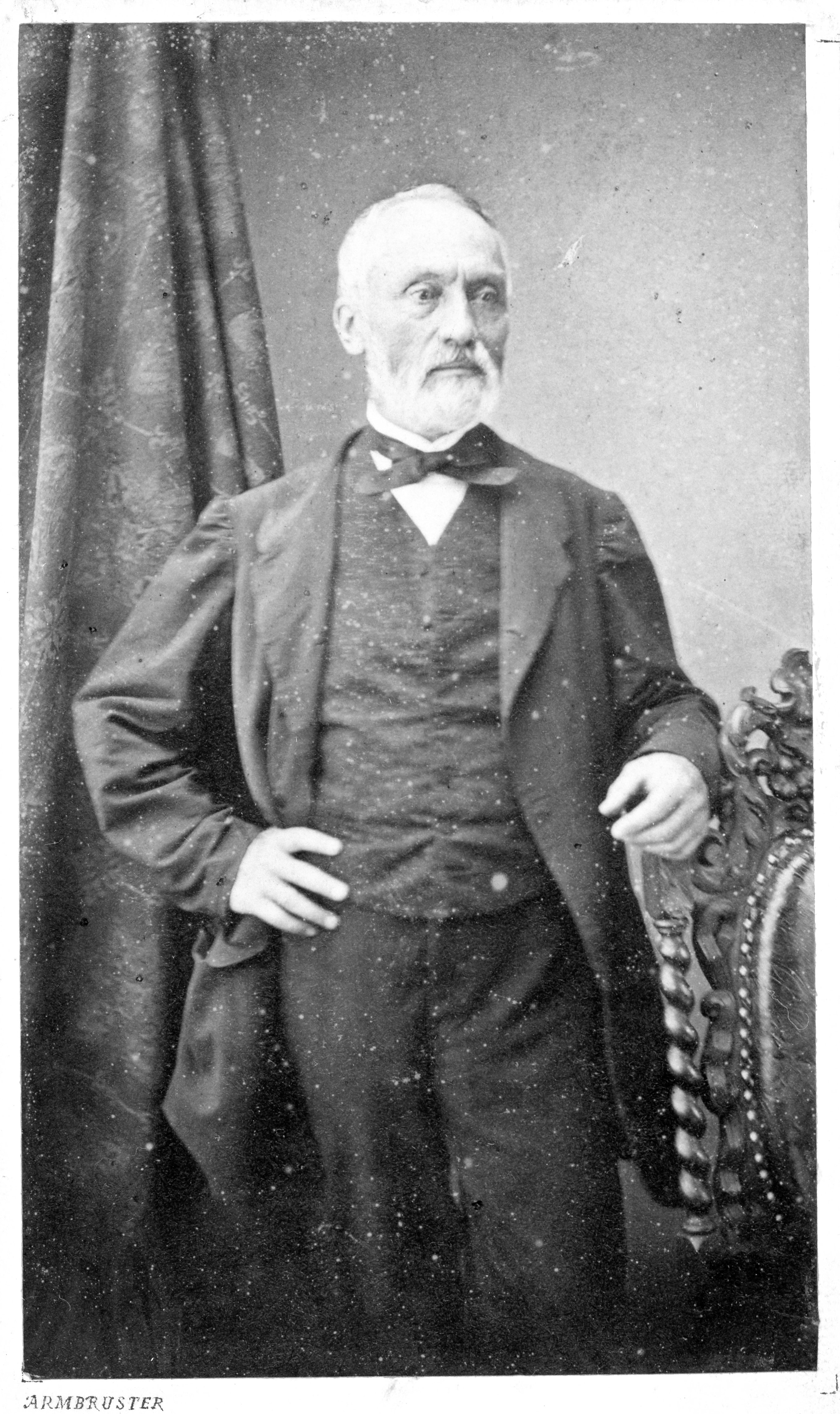
Eugène Dumortier in 1875

He worked as a manufacturer of gilding and at around the age of 50 his focus turned to geology. He is remembered for a four volume paleontological work on the Rhône-Alpes region that was published from 1864 to 1874. The mineral dumortierite is named after him.

In 1860 he became a member of the Société géologique de France. Also, he was a founding member of the Association lyonnaise des amis des sciences naturelles (1872) and the Société de géographie de Lyon (1873). His large collection of fossils was bequeathed to the natural history museum in Lyon.

== Published works ==
- Note sur quelques fossiles peu connus ou mal figurés de Lias moyen, 1857.
- Études paléontologiques sur les dépôts jurassiques du bassin du Rhône, T. 1, 1864; T.2, 1867; T.3, 1869; T.4, 1874.
- Sur quelques gisements de l'Oxfordien inférieur de l'Ardèche, 1871.
- Note sur les terrains subordonnés aux gisements de poissons et de végétaux fossiles du Bas-Bugey, 1873 (with Albert Falsan).
- Description des ammonites de la zone à Ammonites tenuilobatus de Crussol (Ardèche) et quelques autres fossiles jurassiques nouveaux ou peu connus, 1876 (with Charles-François Fontannes).
