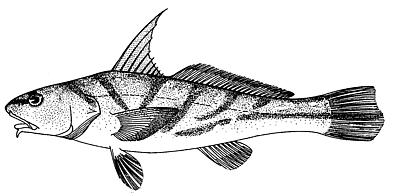

Conservation status
- Least Concern (IUCN 3.1)

Scientific classification
- Kingdom: Animalia
- Phylum: Chordata
- Class: Actinopterygii
- Order: Acanthuriformes
- Family: Sciaenidae
- Genus: Menticirrhus
- Species: M. saxatilis

Binomial name
- Menticirrhus saxatilis (Bloch & Schneider, 1801)

Synonyms
- Johnius saxatilis Bloch & Schneider, 1801; Menticirrhus focaliger Ginsburg, 1952; Sciaena nebulosa Mitchill, 1815

= Menticirrhus saxatilis =

Species of fish

Menticirrhus saxatilis, the northern kingfish or northern kingcroaker, is a species of marine fish in the family Sciaenidae (commonly known as the "drum" or "croaker" family). It lives in the shallow coastal waters of the western Atlantic Ocean and Gulf of Mexico.

== Description ==
The northern kingfish can grow to about 46 centimetres (18 in), but a more usual adult length is 30 centimetres (12 in). It is a slender fish, being most deep bodied in the pectoral region. As in most bottom-feeding fish, its upper jaw projects further than the lower and the snout overhangs the mouth. There is a small barbel on its fleshy lower lip. The dorsal fin is divided into two parts. The front part is triangular, short but tall with 10 spines, the third of which is the longest and is extended into a short filament. The other part of the dorsal fin is long and slightly tapered and has one spine and 24 to 27 soft rays. The pointed pectoral fins are quite large and the anal fin has 1 spine and 8 soft rays. The tailfin has a characteristic slightly concave upper lobe and a rounded lower lobe. The colour is dark grey with a metallic sheen and paler grey below. There are several diagonal bars of darker colour on the upper body. These mostly run towards the rear of the body but one or two bars near the head slope the other way. The fins are a dark colour, tipped with white. Unlike most members of its family, the northern kingfish has no air bladder, so the fish does not make the "croaking" sound that is characteristic of the family.

== Distribution and habitat ==
The northern kingfish is a subtropical, demersal fish found in shallow waters in the western Atlantic Ocean. Its range extends from Massachusetts southwards through the Gulf of Mexico to the Yucatan peninsular of Mexico. It is found in schools in places where the seabed is sand or mud, in the surf zone and in estuaries. It can tolerate low salinity levels and the juveniles are often found in tidal rivers and creeks. It is occasionally seen in Maine and in this more northerly part of its range it is migratory, disappearing from October to May.

== Biology ==
The northern kingfish feeds on benthic invertebrates. The diet consists mainly of small crustaceans such as shrimps and crabs but amphipods, polychaete worms, molluscs, small fish and mysids are also eaten and it also scavenges on carrion.

In the eastern United States, spawning takes place from April to August. The spherical eggs contain oil globules. They are pelagic and disperse with the currents. The developing larvae are somewhat tadpole-like with large heads. By the time the fry reach a length of 5 millimetres (0.20 in) the soft dorsal and anal rays have already appeared and when they are 10 millimetres (0.39 in) long, the spiny rays have also developed. By this stage, their bodies are covered by melanophores. They reach a length of about 12 centimetres (5 in) by their first winter and 25 centimetres (10 in) by their second.

== Uses ==
The northern kingfish is not fished commercially but from New Jersey southwards it is fished for sport and its often white meat by surf anglers and those in boats close to the shore. The bait used can be pieces of squid, clams or bloodworms.
