= Ernest Chantre =

French archaeologist and anthropologist (1843–1924)

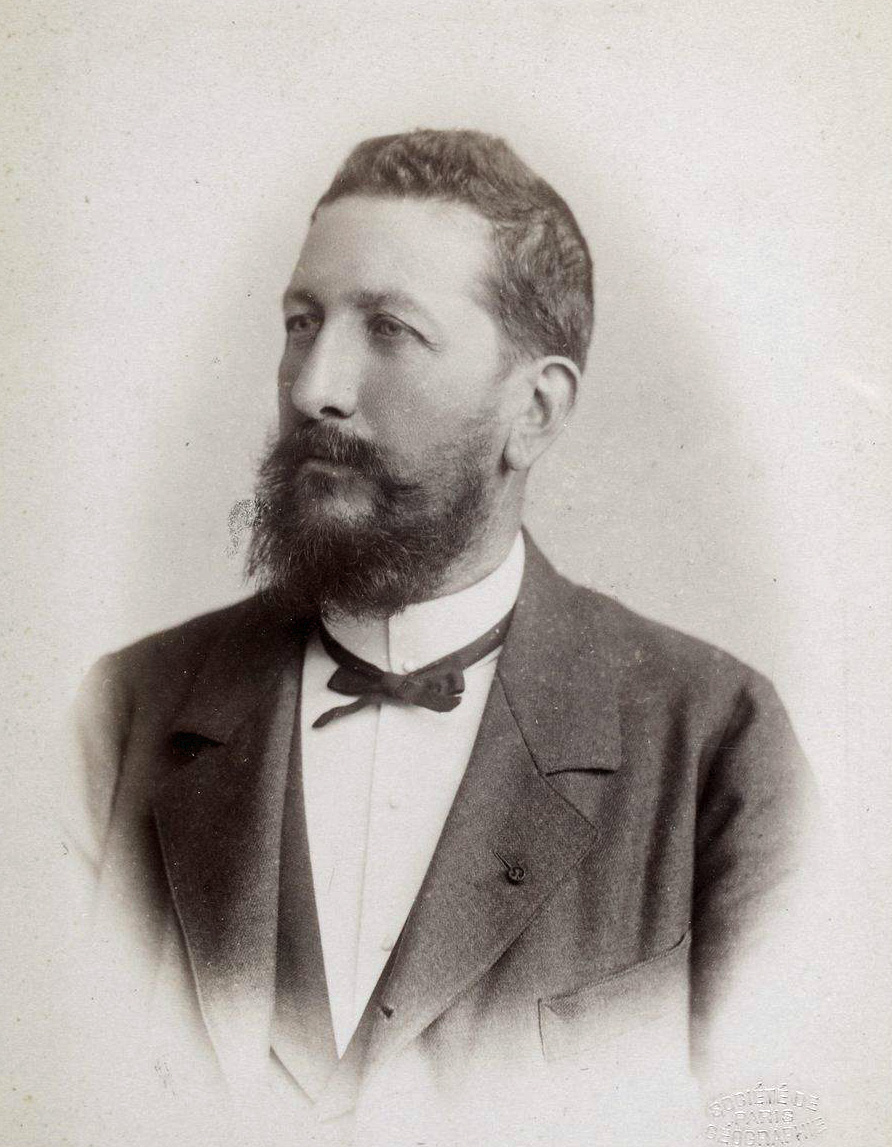
Ernest Chantre

Ernest Chantre (13 January 1843, in Lyon – 24 November 1924, in Écully) was a prominent French archaeologist and anthropologist.

== Career ==
From 1878 to 1910 he was an instructor of geology and anthropology classes at the Muséum de Lyon, and concurrently taught courses in anthropology at the Faculté des Sciences in Lyon (1881–1908). From 1873 to 1888, he was editor of the journal Matériaux pour l'Histoire primitive et naturelle de l'Homme.

From 1873 to 1913 he was involved in numerous scientific missions throughout Asia Minor, North Africa, Armenia and the Caucasus region.

He was a founding member of the Société de géographie de Lyon (1873) and the Société préhistorique française (1904). He was also a member of the Société géologique de France (from 1867) and the Société linnéenne de Lyon (from 1885). In 1882 the African darter subspecies, Anhinga rufa chantrei was named in his honour by ornithologist Émile Oustalet.

== Selected works ==
- Études paléoethnologiques dans le bassin du Rhône. Âge du bronze; recherches sur l'origine de la métallurgie en France, 1875 – Paleoethnological studies of the Rhône basin. The Bronze Age; research on the origins of metallurgy in France.
- Études paléontologiques dans le Bassin du Rhône, période quaternaire, 1880 (with Louis Lortet) – Paleoethnological studies of the Rhône basin, Quaternary age.
- Recherches paléoethnologiques dans la Russie méridionale et spécialement au Caucase et en Crimée, 1881 – Paleoethnological research of meridional Russia, especially the Caucasus and the Crimea.
- Recherches anthropologiques dans le Caucase (4 volumes) 1885–87 – Anthropological research in the Caucasus.
- Les Arméniens; esquisse historique et ethnographique, 1896 – The Armenians, historical and ethnographical outline.
- Recherches archéologiques dans l'Asie occidentale : mission en Cappadoce, 1893-1894, (with Ernest Leroux), 1898 – Archaeological research of western Asia; mission to Cappadocia in 1893–94.
- Paléontologie humaine : l'homme quaternaire dans le bassin du Rhône : étude géologique et anthropologique : propositions données par la faculté, 1901 – Human paleontology, Quaternary humans of the Rhône basin, etc.
- Recherches anthropologiques dans l'Afrique Orientale; Egypte, 1904 – Anthropological research in eastern Africa, Egypt.
- Recherches anthropologiques dans la Berbérie orientale, Tripolitaine, Tunisie, Algérie, (with Lucien Joseph Bertholon), 1913 – Anthropological research in eastern Barbary, Tripolitania, Tunisia, Algeria.
