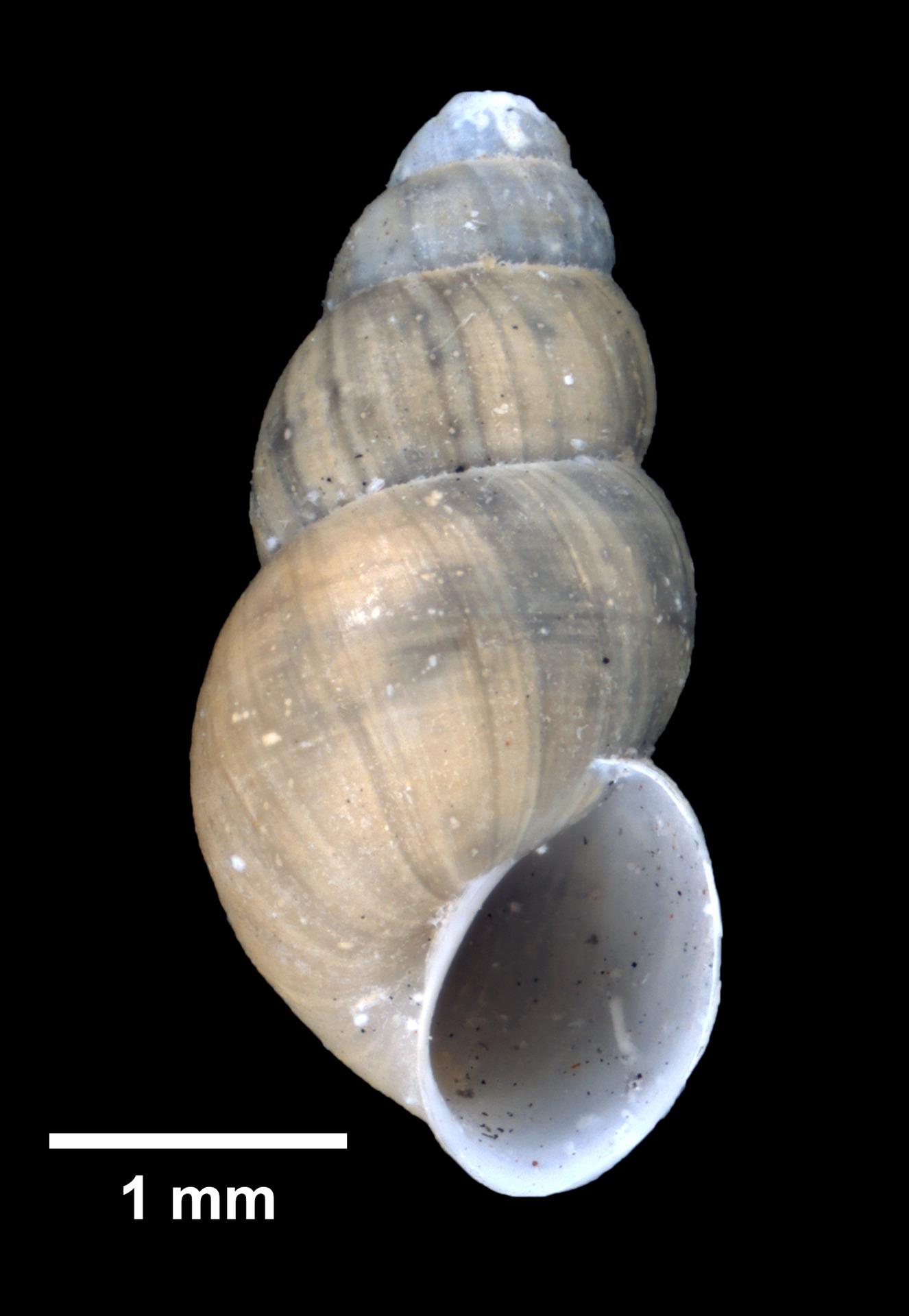
- Ecrobia truncata

Scientific classification
- Kingdom: Animalia
- Phylum: Mollusca
- Class: Gastropoda
- Subclass: Caenogastropoda
- Order: Littorinimorpha
- Family: Hydrobiidae
- Genus: Ecrobia
- Species: E. truncata

Binomial name
- Ecrobia truncata (Vanatta, 1924)

Synonyms
- Hydrobia minuta (Totten, 1834) (preoccupied name); Hydrobia totteni Morrison, 1954; Hydrobia truncata (Vanatta, 1924)

= Ecrobia truncata =

Species of gastropod

Ecrobia truncata, common name the truncated marsh hydrobia or minute hydrobia, is a species of very small aquatic snail, an operculate gastropod mollusk in the family Hydrobiidae.

== Distribution ==
This species can be found along the coasts of Virginia, Massachusetts and Canada, the Northwest Atlantic Ocean and along the coasts of the British Isles and Scandinavia and in the Mediterranean Sea.

== Description ==
The maximum recorded shell length is 5.8 mm. The small shell is elongate to ovate. Its color varies between pale brown and grayish with a glassy shine. The round whorls are smooth with deep sutures. The apex is in many cases eroded. The ovate aperture is characterized by a marked lip edge.

The dark brown to almost black head shows white spots on the tentacles and on the neck and a black spot in front of each eye.

== Habitat ==
Minimum recorded depth is 0 m. Maximum recorded depth is 3.7 m. The minute hydrobia can be found on seaweeds and mud close to the banks of brackish marshes and estuaries.

== Biology ==
The minute hydrobia is a secondary host of a parasitic fluke, Homalometron pallidum. This has a complex life cycle with the adult phase being found in a small fish, the mummichog, Fundulus heteroclitus.
