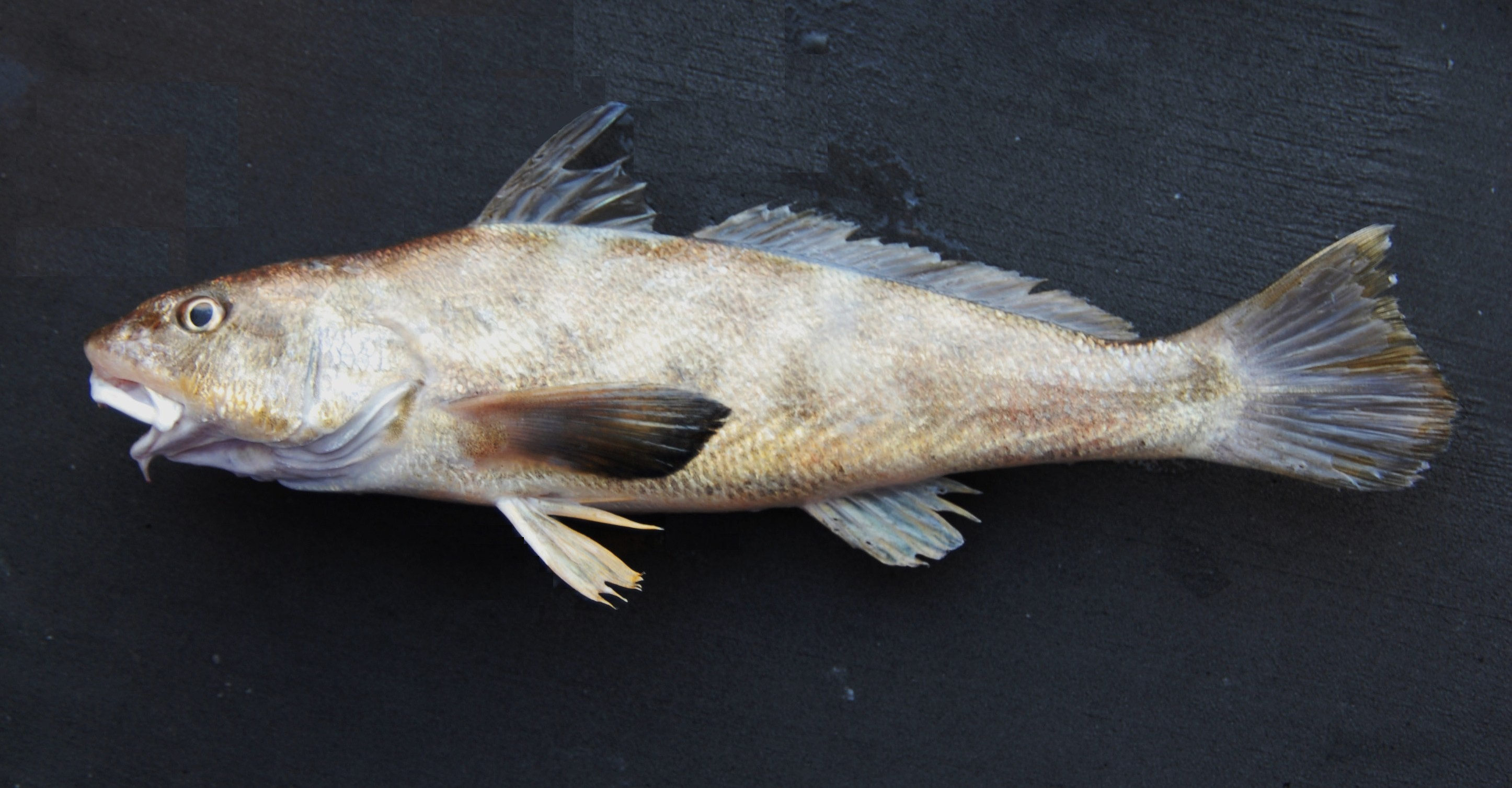
- Menticirrhus americanus

Scientific classification
- Kingdom: Animalia
- Phylum: Chordata
- Class: Actinopterygii
- Division: Teleostei
- Order: Acanthuriformes
- Family: Sciaenidae
- Genus: Menticirrhus; Gill, 1861

Type species
- Perca alburnus Linnaeus, 1766

Species
- see text

Synonyms
- Cirrimens Gill, 1862; Umbrula Jordan & C. H. Eigenmann, 1889

= Menticirrhus =

Menticirrhus Temporal range: Late Miocene to Present

Genus of fishes

Menticirrhus is a genus of marine ray-finned fish belonging to the family Sciaenidae, the drums or croakers. They are commonly known as kingcroakers or kingfish. These fish are found in the Western Atlantic and Eastern Pacific Oceans.

== Taxonomy ==
Menticirrhus was first proposed as a genus in 1861 by the American biologist Theodore Gill with Perca alburnus, a species described by Linnaeus in 1763 from Charleston, as its only species and designated as its type species. This genus has been placed in the subfamily Sciaeninae by some workers, but the 5th edition of Fishes of the World does not recognise subfamilies within the Sciaenidae which it places in the order Acanthuriformes.

== Etymology ==
Menticirrhus is a combination of mentum, meaning "chin", and cirrhus, which means barbel, an allusion to the single thick barbel on the chin.

== Species ==
Menticirrhus contains the following species:

- Menticirrhus americanus (Linnaeus, 1758) (Southern kingcroaker)
- Menticirrhus elongatus (Günther, 1864) (Pacific kingcroaker)
- Menticirrhus littoralis (Holbrook, 1847) (Gulf kingcroaker)
- Menticirrhus nasus (Günther, 1868) (Highfin king croaker)
- Menticirrhus ophicephalus (Jenyns, 1840) (Snakehead kingcroaker)
- Menticirrhus paitensis Hildebrand, 1946 (Paita kingcroaker)
- Menticirrhus panamensis (Steindachner, 1877) (Panama kingcroaker)
- Menticirrhus saxatilis (Bloch & Schneider, 1801) (Northern kingfish)
- Menticirrhus undulatus (Girard, 1854) (California kingcroaker)

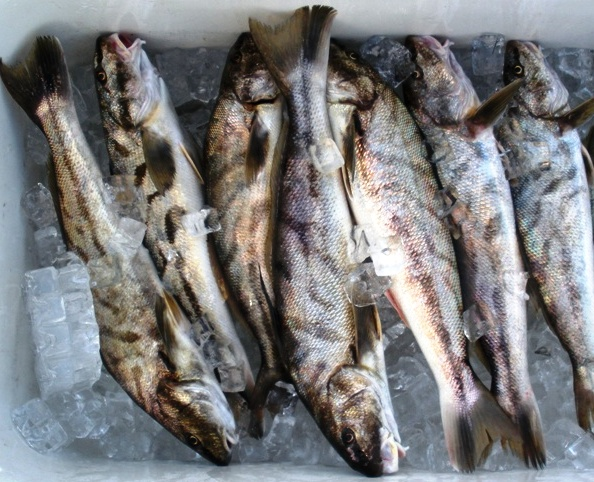
Kingfish caught from the Great South Bay.

== Characteristics ==
Menticirrhus kingfish have elongated bodies which have a rounded cross section and a flat underside. The head is long and low with a somewhat conical snout which protrudes past the horizontal mouth. There are slits and pores above the mouth with a short, stout barbel on the chin with a pore at its tip and a number of pores at its base. The preoperculum may be smooth or weakly serrated and the gill cover is incised at its angle. The dorsal fin is supported by between 10 and 13 flexible fins and between 19 and 27 soft rays while the anal fin has a single weak spine and 7 to 9 soft rays. The scales are small and ctenoid. The largest species in the genus is the California kingcroaker (M. undulatus) which has a maximum published total length of 71 cm (28 in) and the smallest is the Paita kingcroaker (M. paitensis) which has a maximum published total length of 40 cm (16 in).

== Distribution ==
Menticirrhus fishes are found in the eastern Pacific between California and Peru and in the western Atlantic from Massachusetts in the north to northern Argentina.
