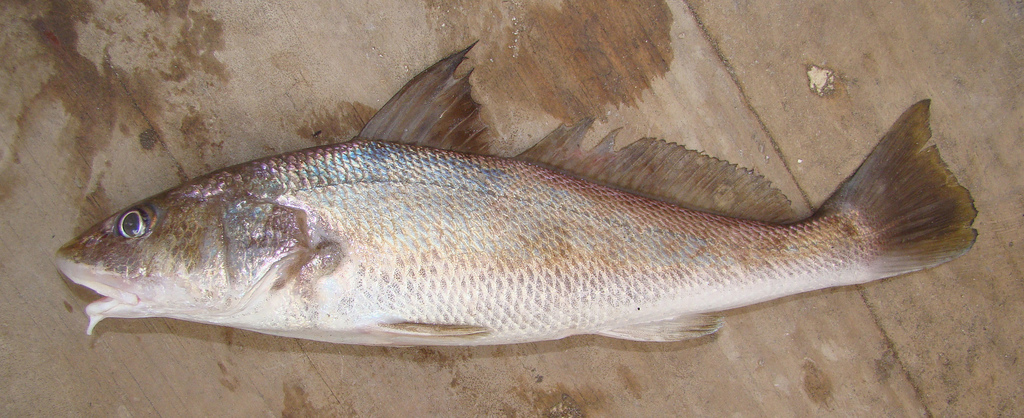

Conservation status
- Least Concern (IUCN 3.1)

Scientific classification
- Kingdom: Animalia
- Phylum: Chordata
- Class: Actinopterygii
- Order: Acanthuriformes
- Family: Sciaenidae
- Genus: Menticirrhus
- Species: M. americanus

Binomial name
- Menticirrhus americanus (Linnaeus, 1758)

Synonyms
- Cyprinus americanus Linnaeus, 1758; Menticirrhus martinicensis (Cuvier, 1830); Perca alburnus Linnaeus, 1766; Umbrina arenata Cuvier, 1830; Umbrina gracilis Cuvier, 1830; Umbrina martinicensis Cuvier, 1830

= Menticirrhus americanus =

Species of fish

Menticirrhus americanus, the southern kingfish, southern kingcroaker, king whiting, Carolina whiting, sea mullet, roundhead, or whiting, is a species of marine fish in the family Sciaenidae. It lives in shallow coastal waters on the western fringes of the Atlantic Ocean.

== Description ==
The southern kingcroaker can grow to about 50 centimetres (20 in) but a more usual adult length is 30 centimetres (12 in).

The southern kingcroaker is a slender fish, deepest about two fifths of the way along. The upper jaw projects further than the lower and the snout overhangs the mouth. There is a small barbel on the fleshy lower lip. The dorsal fin is divided into two parts. The number of spines and soft rays in the fins is indicative of the species and in M. americanus, the front part of the dorsal fin is broadly triangular and has 10 spines and the other part is long and has 1 spine and 22 to 25 soft rays. The pointed pectoral fins are large and the anal fin has 1 spine and 7 or 8 soft rays. The tail fin has a characteristic slightly concave upper lobe and a rounded lower lobe. The colour of the fish is silvery grey, sometimes with a coppery sheen, and paler grey below. There are sometimes several broad slanting bands of darker colour on the back of the fish.

== Distribution and habitat ==
The southern kingcroaker is a subtropical, demersal fish found in shallow waters in the western Atlantic Ocean. It has a discontinuous range extending from New York southwards to Texas, and from Yucatán southwards to Buenos Aires, Argentina. The northern portion of its range is interrupted in its not being found in southern Florida and the southern portion of its range is interrupted by absence from the West Indies. It is found in places where the seabed is sand or mud, often on sandy beaches. The juveniles can tolerate low salinity levels and are often found in estuaries.

== Biology ==
The southern kingcroaker feeds on benthic invertebrates. The diet consists mainly of small crustaceans such as shrimps and crabs but amphipods, polychaete worms, molluscs and small fish are also eaten and it also scavenges for detritus and carrion.

Spawning takes place from June to November in the area of Delaware Bay.

== Uses ==
The southern kingcroaker is fished both commercially and by beach anglers.
