= Eusemius =

Eusemius Temporal range: Early Tithonian

Scientific classification
- Kingdom: Animalia
- Phylum: Chordata
- Class: Actinopterygii
- Clade: Halecomorphi
- Genus: †Eusemius; Vetter, 1881
- Species: †E. beatae

Binomial name
- †Eusemius beatae Vetter, 1881

Extinct genus of fishes

Eusemius is an extinct genus of prehistoric marine ray-finned fish, previously described as a macrosemiid, that lived during the Late Jurassic. It contains a single species, E. beatae, from the Tithonian-aged Eichstätt Formation of Germany. It is known from a single very small specimen, likely a juvenile, that is likely now lost. It closely resembles the co-occurring Ophiopsis and Ophiopsiella (which are now classified in the Ionoscopiformes), only differing in the non-bifurcated dorsal fin rays.

== See also ==
- Prehistoric fish
- List of prehistoric bony fish
