= Blue Lias =

Triassic/Jurassic geological formation in the UK

Blue Lias Formation
- Stratigraphic range: Rhaetian-Lower Sinemurian Planorbis-Semicostatum ~201–198 Ma
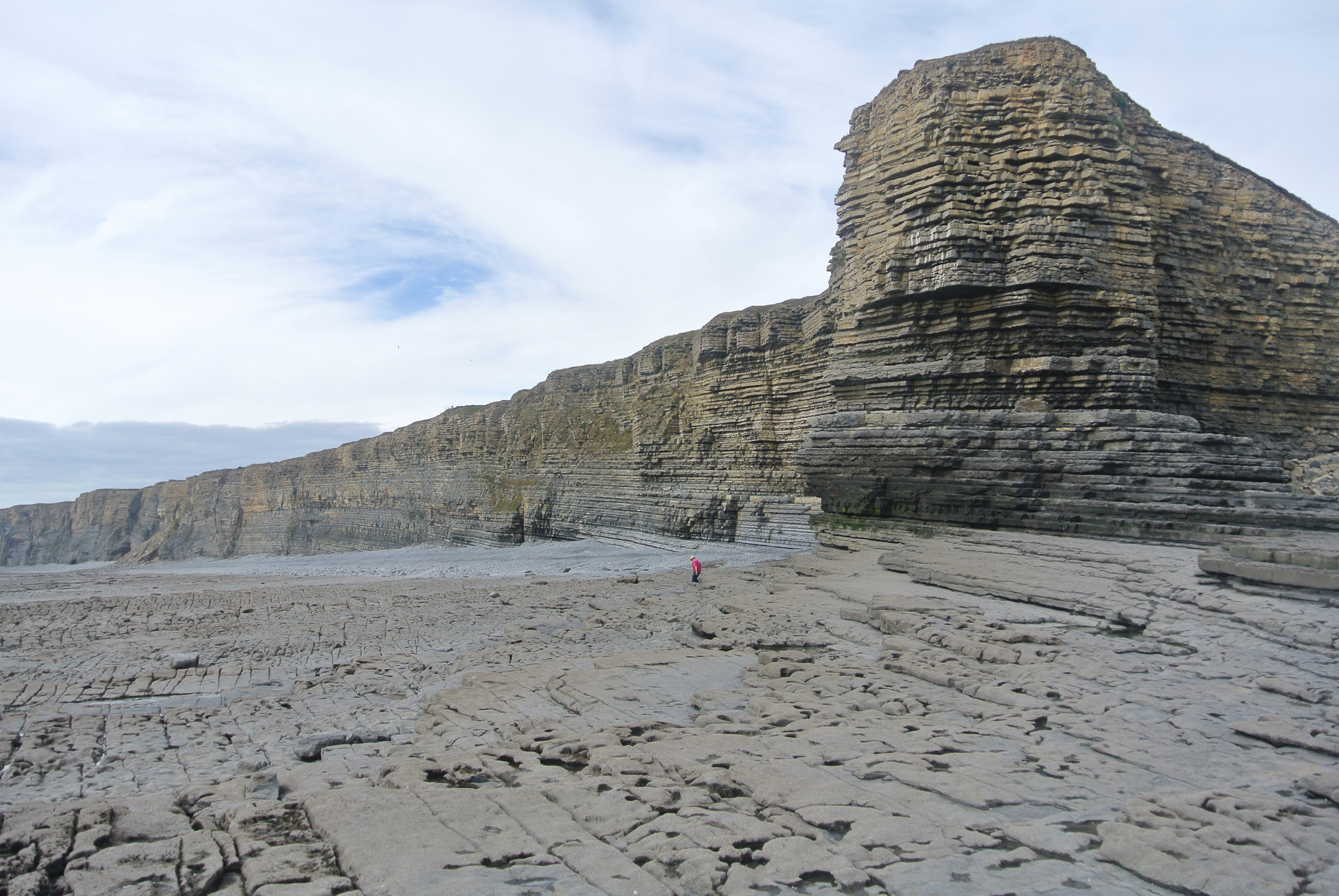
- Lower Lias sequence exposed at Nash Point, Glamorgan, Wales
- Type: Geological formation
- Unit of: Lias Group
- Sub-units: Wilmcote Limestone Member, Saltford Shale Member, Rugby Limestone Member
- Underlies: Charmouth Mudstone Formation
- Overlies: Lilstock Formation
- Thickness: up to 120 metres (390 ft)

Lithology
- Primary: Limestone
- Other: Mudstone

Location
- Region: Europe
- Country: United Kingdom
- Extent: South West England, Wales

Type section
- Location: Saltford railway cutting

The Blue Lias is a geological formation in southern, eastern and western England and parts of South Wales, part of the Lias Group. The Blue Lias consists of a sequence of limestone and shale layers, laid down in latest Triassic and early Jurassic times, between 195 and 200 million years ago. The Blue Lias is famous for its fossils, especially ammonites.

Its age corresponds to the Rhaetian to lower Sinemurian stages of the geological timescale, thus fully including the Hettangian stage. It is the lowest of the three divisions of the Lower Jurassic period and, as such, is also given the name Lower Lias. Stratigraphically it can be subdivided into three members: the Wilmcote Limestone, Saltford Shale and Rugby Limestone.

== Lithology and facies ==
The Blue Lias comprises decimetre scale alternations of argillaceous limestone and mudstone. These alternations are caused by short-term climatic variations during the Early Jurassic attributed to orbital forcing (Milankovitch cycles). These limestone-mudstone alternations pass up into a clay member formerly known as the Lower Lias Clay now the Charmouth Mudstone. This lithology consists of monotonous mudstones weathering to clay at the surface. Sparse thin limestone and nodule bands are seen where the rocks are exposed. The deposition of a clay-rich mudstone member normally indicates deposition in a deeper marine environment. The lowest beds of the formation are referred to as the "Pre-planorbis beds" in reference them being deposited before the first appearance of the ammonite Psiloceras planorbis.

=== Wilmcote Limestone ===
In certain restricted parts of Britain, the lowermost member of the Blue Lias is the Wilmcote Limestone. It lies above the Cotham Member of the Lilstock Formation and beneath the Saltford Shale Member. The Wilmcote Limestone of central England was formerly quarried close to Stratford-upon-Avon, for example at Wilmcote, Temple Grafton and Binton. It is roughly 200 million years old, dating back to the dawn of the Jurassic Period.

Much of the Wilmcote Limestone is very fine-grained, blue-grey when fresh, and very finely layered. Fossils are quite rare, except in the lowest beds. It was formerly used for a variety of purposes, including walling, building, paving, gravestones, cement-making and as a source of agricultural lime. It is no longer quarried, and most of the old quarries are either infilled or overgrown.

Geologists think that the Wilmcote Limestone originated as layers of fine-grained mud on the floor of a sheltered, shallow muddy sea or lagoon that covered parts of central England at the dawn of the Jurassic Period. Very little life could tolerate the stagnant conditions on the seabed. As a consequence the mud was seldom disturbed, which is why the fine, paper-like layering is preserved.

Above the sea bed, the shallower waters supported ammonites, fish, and marine reptiles (ichthyosaurs and plesiosaurs). Their remains were discovered in the Wilmcote Limestone quarries during the nineteenth century. The Warwickshire Museum houses a collection of these fossils and some are on display at the Market Hall Museum in Warwick.

== Occurrence ==
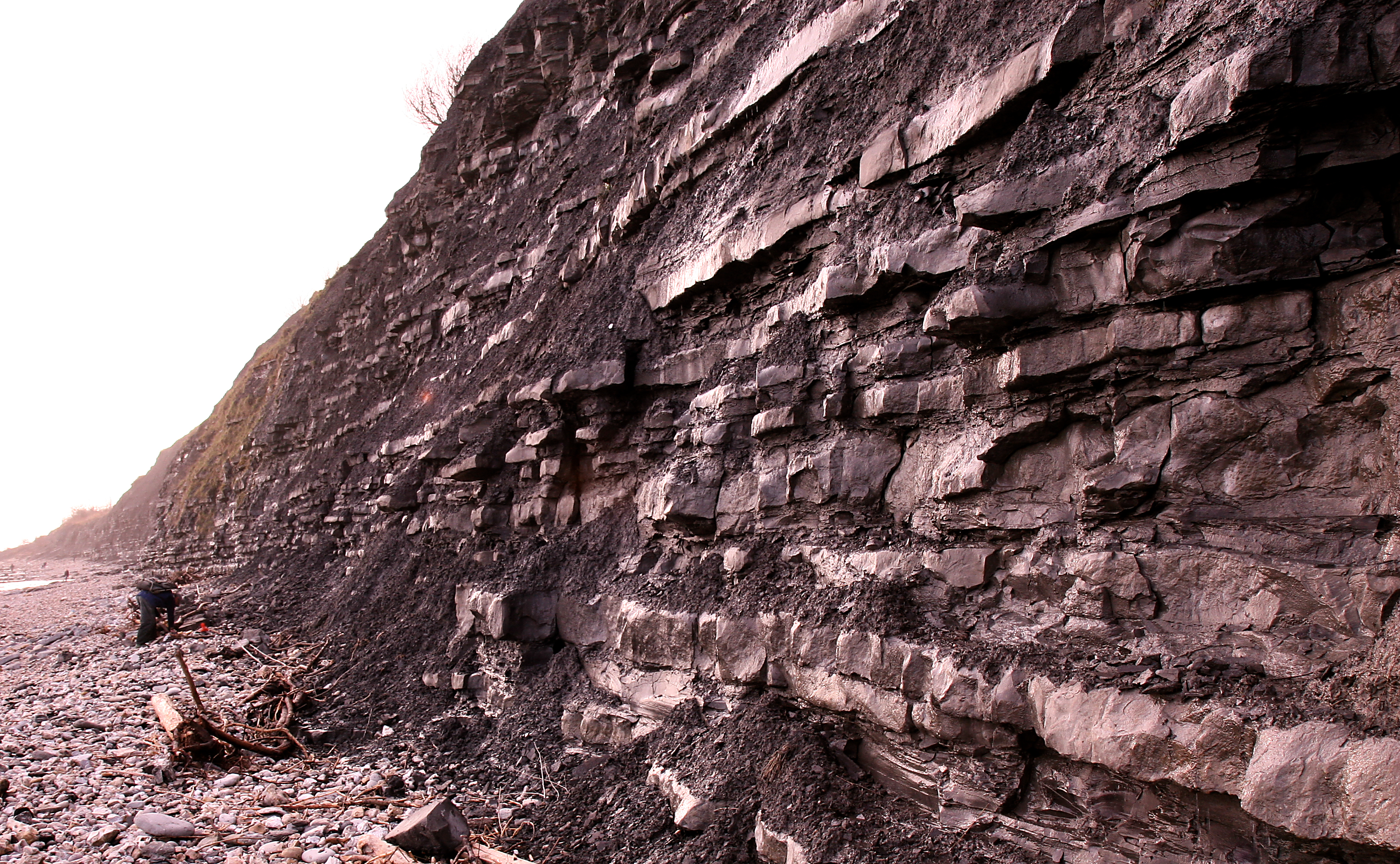
Blue Lias formation at Lyme Regis, Dorset

The Blue Lias is a prevalent feature of the cliffs around Lyme Regis and Charmouth, on the Jurassic Coast in Dorset, where it exists in layers of limestone interspersed with softer clay. It is also notable for its presence in Somerset, particularly around the Polden Hills, Keinton Mandeville and Glastonbury area, and it forms a broad plain across the East Midlands. It also appears near Whitby in Yorkshire and Southam in Warwickshire where a pub is named after it. There are outcrops along the coast of South Wales, notably that of the Vale of Glamorgan. The type section of the Blue Lias is at Saltford near Bath.

== Use in construction ==
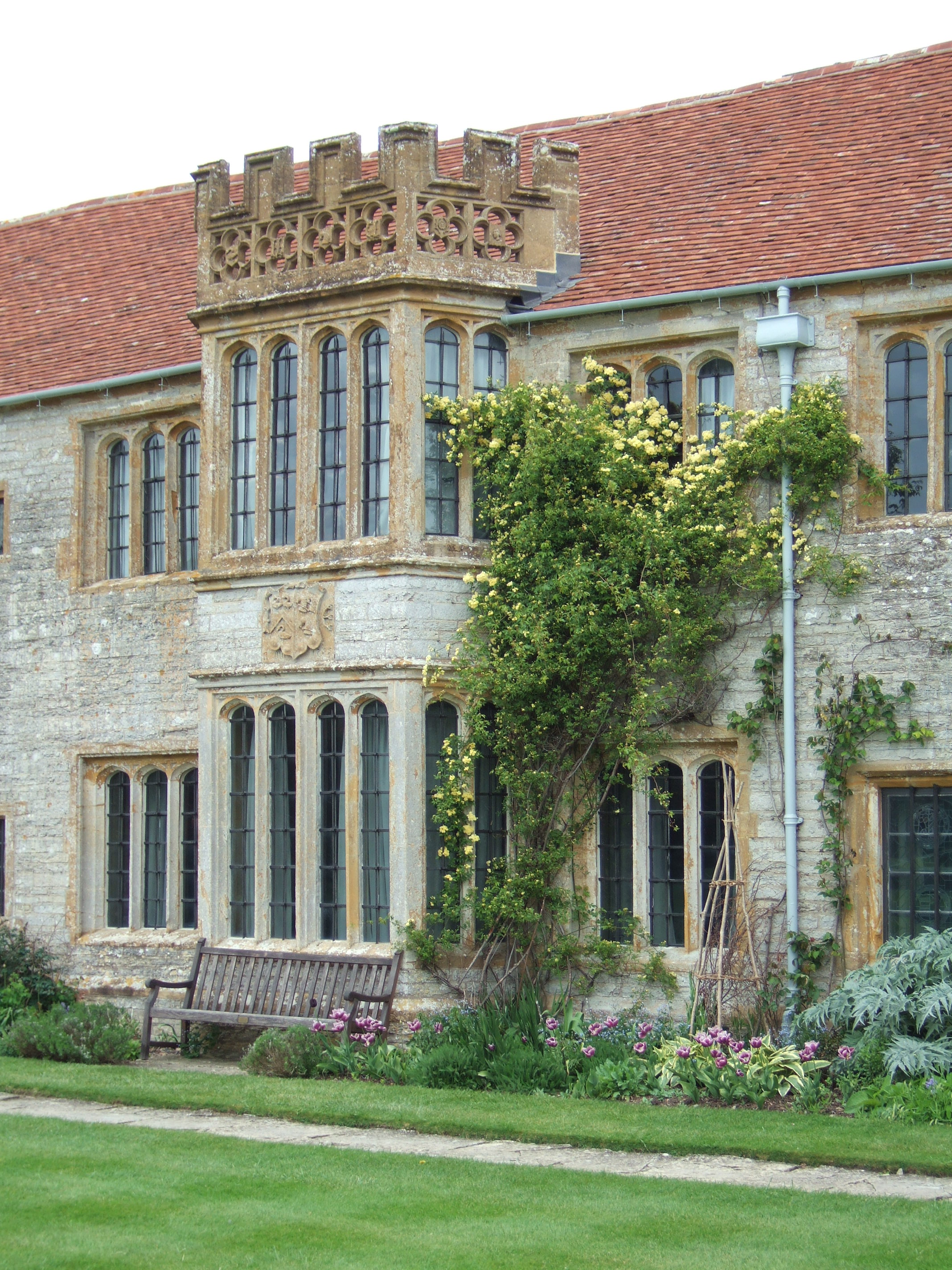
Lytes Cary, Somerset, built of Blue Lias with Ham stone dressings around the windows

Blue Lias is useful as a building stone, and as a source of lime for making lime mortar. Because it is argillaceous, the lime is hydraulic. Since the mid-nineteenth century, it has been used as a raw material for cement, in South Wales, Somerset, Warwickshire, and Leicestershire. The cement plant quarry at Rugby, Warwickshire is probably the best exposure of the formation: more than 100 layers can be seen.

In areas where Blue Lias is quarried it has been used in buildings and churches as well as tombstones in cemeteries. An example of a Blue Lias town is Street, near Glastonbury. Other examples of Blue Lias buildings can be found in the nearby towns of Somerton and Ilchester.

It remains popular in more modern-day surroundings where it is used in the construction of new housing developments and extensions for existing buildings in conservation areas. Blue Lias is mainly used in flooring, walling and paving slabs – both coursed and layered. It is also used in the making of flagstones and cobbles.

There are only four quarries in Somerset quarrying Blue Lias at present. AR Purnell at Ashen Cross Quarry in Somerton have been mining blue lias stone since 1996. Hadspen Quarry Ltd. Hadspen Quarry operate one in Keinton Mandeville. Ham & Doulting Stone Co Ltd. operate one of these, Tout Quarry near Somerton.

== Paleofauna ==
The rock is rich in fossil remains from the Jurassic period. The blue-grey colour is provided by its iron content, enclosed to a large extent in pyrites.

Blue Lias archosaurs

Color key: Taxon / Reclassified taxon / Taxon falsely reported as present / Dubious taxon or junior synonym / Ichnotaxon / Ootaxon / Morphotaxon	Notes; Uncertain or tentative taxa are in small text; ~~crossed out~~ taxa are discredited.

=== Dinosaurs ===
==== Theropods ====
Theropods of the Blue Lias
Genus	Species	Location	Stratigraphic position	Material	Notes	Images
Dracoraptor	D. hanigani	Lavernock Point	Pre-planorbis Beds, lowermost Hettangian	NMW 2015.5G.1–2015.5G.11 "a disarticulated, but associated partial skeleton"	A coelophysoid theropod	
Dornraptor	D. normani	Lower cliff face, Charmouth	Black Ven Marl Member?	GSM 109560, Left femur; NHMUK OR 39496, Partial hind limb	An Averostran theropod, possible Ceratosaur. In 2024 was formally described, but referred to the Blue Lias. A paper non quoted on the description relocated it on the Charmouth Mudstone Formation.	
Sarcosaurus	S. woodi	Wilmcote	angulata zone, late Hettangian (NHMUK PV R3542) Rugby Limestone Member liasicus to semicosatum zones, lowermost Sinemurian (WARMS G667–690)	Paratype specimens: NHMUK PV R3542, complete right tibia WARMS G667–690, partial skeleton	Basal neotheropod, holotype specimen is known from the Scunthorpe Mudstone	

=== Pterosaurs ===
Pterosaurs of the Blue Lias
Genus	Species	Location	Stratigraphic position	Material	Notes	Images
Dimorphodon	D. macronyx	Aust Cliff, Lyme Regis		NHMUK PV R 1034, NHMUK PV OR 41212, NHMUK PV R 1035	A basal pterosaur	

=== Fish ===
Numerous fish species are known from the Blue Lias and overlying Charmouth Mudstone.

Fish of the Charmouth Mudstone Formation
Genus	Species	Location	Stratigraphic position	Material	Notes	Images
Acrodus					A hybodont shark	
Hybodus					A hybodont shark	
Palidiplospinax					A synechodontiform shark	
Squaloraja	S. tenuispina, S. polyspondyla				Closely related to modern chimaeras	
Myriacanthus	M. paradoxus, M. granulatus				A myriacanthid closely related to modern chimaeras	
Dorsetichthys	D. bechei				A stem-group teleost	
"Coccolepis"	"C." liassicus				A coccolepidid fish, probably does not belong to the genus	
Cosmolepis	C. ornatus				An enigmatic basal actinopterygian	
Holophagus	H. gulo				A coelacanth	
Chondrosteus	C. acipenseroides				A chondrosteid acipenseriform fish, related to sturgeon and paddlefish	
Oxygnathus	O. ornatus				A palaeonisciform fish	
Saurorhynchus	S. brevirostris, S. anningae				A member of Saurichthyiformes	
Ptycholepis	P. gracilis, P. curtus				A palaeonisciform fish	
Dapedium	Spp.				A dapediiform fish	
Caturus	Spp.				An amiiform fish related to bowfins	
Platysiagum	P. sclerocephalum				A platysiagid fish	
Furo	F. orthostomus				A member of Ionoscopiformes within Halecomorphi	
Furo	F. philpotae				A member of Ionoscopiformes within Halecomorphi	
Heterolepidotus	H. latus				A member of Ionoscopiformes within Halecomorphi	
Heterolepidotus	H. serrulatus				A member of Ionoscopiformes within Halecomorphi	

=== Ichthyosaurs ===
Ichthyosaurs of the Blue Lias
Genus	Species	Location	Stratigraphic position	Material	Notes	Images
Ichthyosaurus	I. larkini	Lyme Regis & Charmouth in Dorset, Street and the north coast of Somerset, and other inland sites across England	Unknown, possibly Pre-planorbis beds	Holotype: BRSUG 25300, referred: AGC 11, CAMSM J5957, NHMUK PV OR5595		
Ichthyosaurus	I. somersetensis	Lyme Regis & Charmouth in Dorset, Street and the north coast of Somerset, and other inland sites across England	Unknown, possibly Pre-planorbis beds	Holotype: ANSP 15766 referred: BRSMG Cb4997, NHMUK PV OR2013AGC 16, ROM 26029		
Ichthyosaurus	I. communis	Lyme Regis & Charmouth in Dorset, Street and the north coast of Somerset, and other inland sites across England	Unknown	BMNH R1162		
Protoichthyosaurus	P. prostaxalis	Somerset	Unknown, probably Pre-planorbis beds	Holotype: BRLSI M3553, "a partial skull, pectoral girdle and both forefins, preserved in ventral view"		
Wahlisaurus	W. massarae	Sutton Hill (Stowey) Quarry, Bishop Sutton	Pre-planorbis beds	BRSMG Cg240, "a practically complete right coracoid"		
?Shastasauridae	Indeterminate	Penarth	Psiloceras planorbis Biozone	NMW95.61G.1, radius	Estimated length of 12–15 metres	
Temnodontosaurus	T. platyodon			PV R 1158, consisting of a Skull, Lower Jaw and Cervical Vertebrae		
Excalibosaurus	E. costini	North Somerset coastline	Arietites (Coroniceras) bucklandi Biozone	Holotype: BRSMG Cc881, "...a complete skull, with associated forefin, pectoral girdle, vertebrae and ribs..." referred: ROM 47697		ROM 47697, a nearly complete skeleton of Excalibosaurus on display at the Royal Ontario Museum.

=== Plesiosaurs ===
Plesiosaurs of the Blue Lias
Genus	Species	Location	Stratigraphic position	Material	Notes	Images
Atychodracon	A. megacephalus	Street-on-the-Fosse	Lowermost Blue Lias	Holotype:BRSMG Cb 2335	Rhomaleosaurid	
Avalonnectes	A. arturi	Street, Somerset (referred specimen)		NHMUK 14550, "the posterior portion of the skull, and a partial postcranial skeleton" uncatalogued partial specimen	Rhomaleosaurid	
Eurycleidus	E. arcuatus	Street		NHMUK 2030 (lectotype), 2027-2029, 2047, 2061, R1317-1319 (paralectotypes, probably belonging to the same individual)	Rhomaleosaurid	
Macroplata	M. tenuceps	Harbury, Warwickshire		NHMUK PV R5488, nearly complete skeleton	Rhomaleosaurid	
Eoplesiosaurus	E. antiquior	Watchet, Somerset		TTNCM 8348, postcranial skeleton	Basal Plesiosauroid	
Plesiosaurus	P. dolichodeirus	Lyme Regis and Charmouth, Dorset	Sinemurian stage (upper Blue Lias, Shales-with-Beef member or lower Black Ven Marl	NHMUK PV OR 22656, complete skeleton	Plesiosaurid	The holotype of Plesiosaurus dolichodeirus, on display at the Natural History Museum in London
Stratesaurus	S. taylori	Street, Somerset	lowermost Hettangian	OUMNH J.10337, "a skull and partial postcranial skeleton including anterior cervical and pectoral vertebrae, a partial hindlimb and ilium"	Rhomaleosaurid	
Thalassiodracon	T. hawkinsii	Street	Pre-planorbis Beds	NHMUK 2018 "almost complete skeleton missing distal parts of limbs" CAMSM J.35181, partial skeleton	Pliosaurid affinities	

=== Insects ===
Insect compression fossils are known from the localities of Binton in Warwickshire and Copt Heath near Birmingham.

Insects of the Blue Lias
Genus	Species	Location	Stratigraphic position	Material	Notes	Images
Omma	O. liassica	Binton	Planorbis		An ommatid beetle, genus extant	
Holcoptera	Ho. schlotheimi	Binton	Planorbis		An aquatic beetle belong to the extinct family Coptoclavidae	
Liassophila	L. hydromanicoides	Binton	Planorbis		A member of Mecoptera	
Orthophlebia	O. pictipennis	Binton	Planorbis		An orthophlebiid mecopteran related to living scorpionflies	
Hagla	H. gracilis	Binton	Planorbis		An orthopteran belonging to the family Haglidae, related to living grigs	
Elcana	Indeterminate	Binton	Planorbis		An orthopteran belonging to the extinct family Elcanidae	
Protocoris	P. indistinctus	Binton	Planorbis		A true bug belonging to the family Protocoridae, related to living stink bugs	
Archithemis	A. liassina	Binton	Planorbis		A damsel-dragonfly belonging to the extinct family Campterophlebiidae	
Liassophlebia	L. magnifica	Binton	Planorbis		A damsel-dragonfly belonging to the extinct family Liassophlebiidae	
Necrotaulius		Copt Heath	Planorbis		A caddisfly belonging to the extinct family Necrotauliidae	
Locustopsis	L. spectabilis	Copt Heath	Planorbis		A grasshopper belonging to the extinct family Locustopsidae	
Phanerogramma	P. heeri	Copt Heath	Planorbis		A primitive earwig belonging to the extinct family Dermapteridae	

== See also ==
- White Lias
- List of dinosaur-bearing rock formations
- Charmouth Mudstone Formation, England
- Sorthat Formation, Denmark
- Hasle Formation, Denmark
- Zagaje Formation, Poland
- Drzewica Formation, Poland
- Ciechocinek Formation, Poland
- Borucice Formation, Poland
- Rotzo Formation, Italy
- Saltrio Formation, Italy
- Moltrasio Formation, Italy
- Marne di Monte Serrone, Italy
- Calcare di Sogno, Italy
- Podpeč Limestone, Slovenia
- Coimbra Formation, Portugal
- El Pedregal Formation, Spain
- Fernie Formation, Canada
- Whiteaves Formation, British Columbia
- Navajo Sandstone, Utah
- Aganane Formation, Morocco
- Tafraout Group, Morocco
- Azilal Formation, Morocco
- Budoš Limestone, Montenegro
- Kota Formation, India
- Cañadón Asfalto Formation, Argentina
- Los Molles Formation, Argentina
- Kandreho Formation, Madagascar
- Elliot Formation, South Africa
- Clarens Formation, South Africa
- Evergreen Formation, Australia
- Cattamarra Coal Measures, Australia
- Hanson Formation, Antarctica
- Mawson Formation, Antarctica
