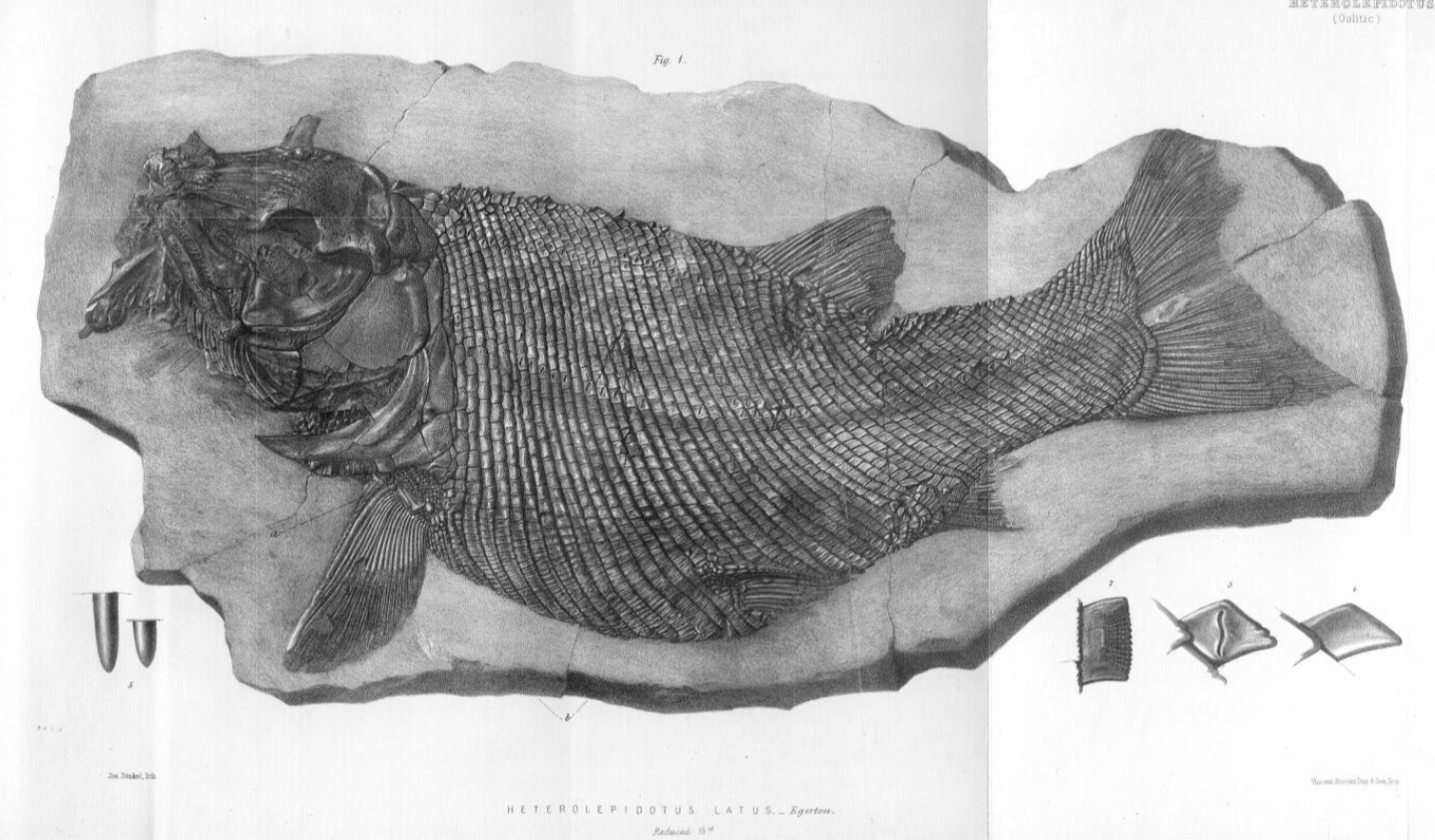
- Specimen of H. latus

Scientific classification
- Kingdom: Animalia
- Phylum: Chordata
- Class: Actinopterygii
- Clade: Halecomorphi
- Order: †Ionoscopiformes
- Genus: †Heterolepidotus; Egerton, 1872

Species
- H. latus Egerton, 1872; H. serrulatus (Agassiz, 1843)

= Heterolepidotus =

Heterolepidotus Temporal range: Early Jurassic (Hettangian-Pliensbachian)

Extinct genus of fishes

Heterolepidotus is an extinct genus of prehistoric marine halecomorph ray-finned fish from the Early Jurassic of Europe. It is alternately considered a member of the Ionoscopiformes or Ophiopsiformes.

== Taxonomy ==
The following species are known:

- H. latus Egerton, 1872 (type species) - Early Jurassic (Sinemurian to Pliensbachian) of England (Blue Lias & Charmouth Mudstone)
- H. serrulatus (Agassiz, 1843) - Early Jurassic (Hettangian) of England (Blue Lias)

The genus Brachyichthys, used to contain Late Jurassic species, was formerly thought to be a synonym of Heterolepidotus, but has been revived by more recent studies. Indeterminate records have been made of Heterolepidotus from the Middle Jurassic (Callovian)-aged Kellaways Formation of England, albeit under an older treatment that placed the Late Jurassic species within Heterolepidotus.

=== Synonyms ===
Several Triassic and Late Jurassic species previously assigned to Heterolepidotus have since been reassigned to other genera or synonymized with other species:

- Heterolepidotus cephalus (Kner, 1866) → Pholidophorus cephalus Kner, 1866
- Heterolepidotus dorsalis (Agassiz, 1834) → Paralepidotus ornatus (Agassiz, 1834)
- Heterolepidotus grandis Davis, 1885 → Osteorachis macrocephalus Egerton, 1868
- Heterolepidotus parvulus (Agassiz, 1834) → Paralepidotus ornatus (Agassiz, 1834)
- Heterolepidotus pectoralis (Bellotti, 1857) → Semionotiformes indet.
- Heterolepidotus radio-punctatus (Agassiz, 1844) → Pholidophorus radio-punctatus Agassiz, 1844
- Heterolepidotus serratus (Bellotti, 1857) → Semionotiformes indet
- Heterolepidotus striatus Agassiz, 1837-44 → nomen dubium
- Heterolepidotus typicus (Winkler, 1861) → Brachyichthys typicus (Winkler, 1861)

== See also ==
- Prehistoric fish
- List of prehistoric bony fish
