= Brachyichthys =

Brachyichthys Temporal range: Late Jurassic (Kimmeridgian to Tithonian)

Scientific classification
- Kingdom: Animalia
- Phylum: Chordata
- Class: Actinopterygii
- Clade: Halecomorphi
- Order: †Ionoscopiformes
- Genus: †Brachyichthys; Winkler, 1862

Type species
- †Brachyichthys typicus Winkler, 1862

Species
- B. manselii (Egerton, 1872); B. typicus Winkler, 1862

Extinct genus of fishes

Brachyichthys is an extinct genus of marine halecomorph ray-finned fish from the Late Jurassic of Europe. It is alternatively placed in the Ionoscopiformes or the Ophiopsiformes.

It contains two species:

- B. manselii (Egerton, 1872) - Kimmeridgian of England (Kimmeridge Clay) (=Semionotus manselii Egerton, 1872)
- B. typicus Winkler, 1862 (type species) - Tithonian of Germany (Solnhofen Limestone)

B. typicus is considered a very rare species within the Solnhofen Fauna, and is known only from a single disarticulated specimen. B. manselii was also previously known only from a partial specimen missing the head and much of the body, until the description of near-complete specimens in 2025, allowing for a much better understanding of the anatomy of the genus overall. Other Solnhofen fish previously assigned to Brachyichthys have been reassigned to new genera such as Elongofuro.

In the past, Brachyichthys was synonymized with Heterolepidotus from the Early Jurassic of England. However, it is now recognized as its own distinct genus. It is still though to be closely related to Heterolepidotus.
