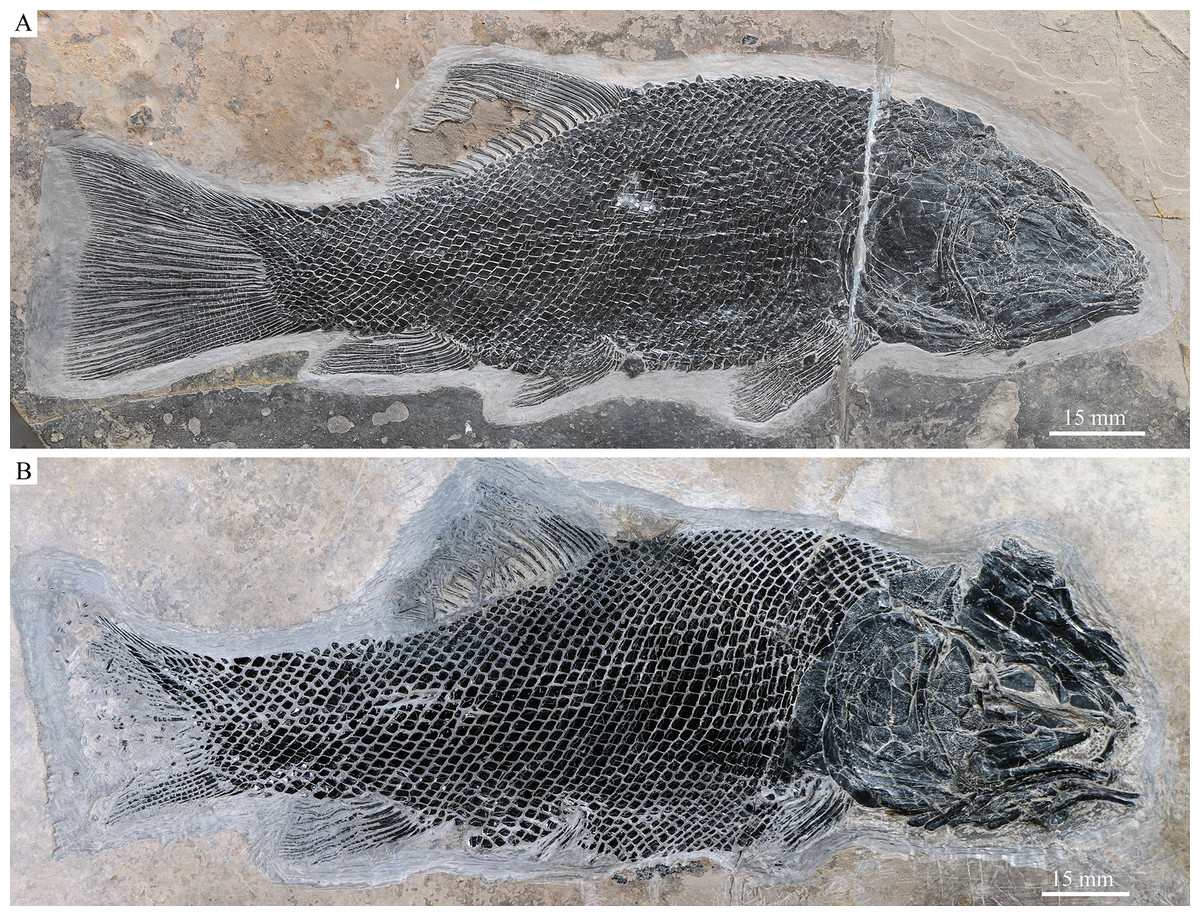
- Fossil specimens, (A) IVPP V18568 (holotype), (B) IVPP V20416
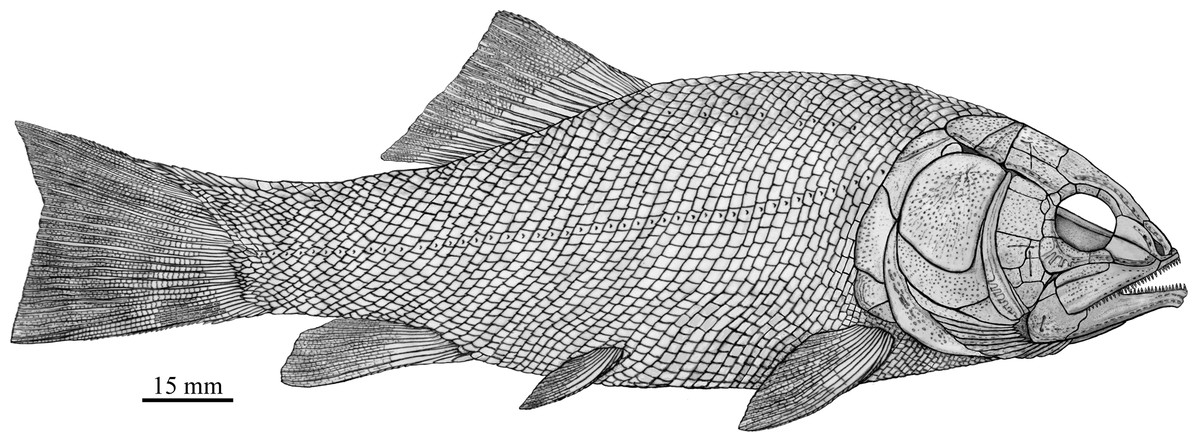
- Reconstruction

Scientific classification
- Kingdom: Animalia
- Phylum: Chordata
- Class: Actinopterygii
- Clade: Halecomorphi
- Order: †Ionoscopiformes
- Genus: †Robustichthys; Xu et al., 2014

Type species
- †Robustichthys luopingensis Xu et al., 2014

= Robustichthys =

Robustichthys Temporal range: Anisian

Extinct arthropod genus

Robustichthys is an extinct genus of ray-finned fish from the Middle Triassic period, contains only one species R. luopingensis. It belonged to the clade Halecomorphi, which were once diverse during the Mesozoic Era, but which are today represented by only a single species, the bowfin. Halecomorphs are holosteans, a clade which first appeared in the fossil record during the Triassic.

== Description ==
Robustichthys is described from Anisian Guanling Formation, Luoping, Yunnan, China. It is the oldest member of Ionoscopiformes, an order within Halecomorphi. The largest specimen reaches length about 36 cm (1.18 ft), which makes it the largest holostean fish in the Middle Triassic.
