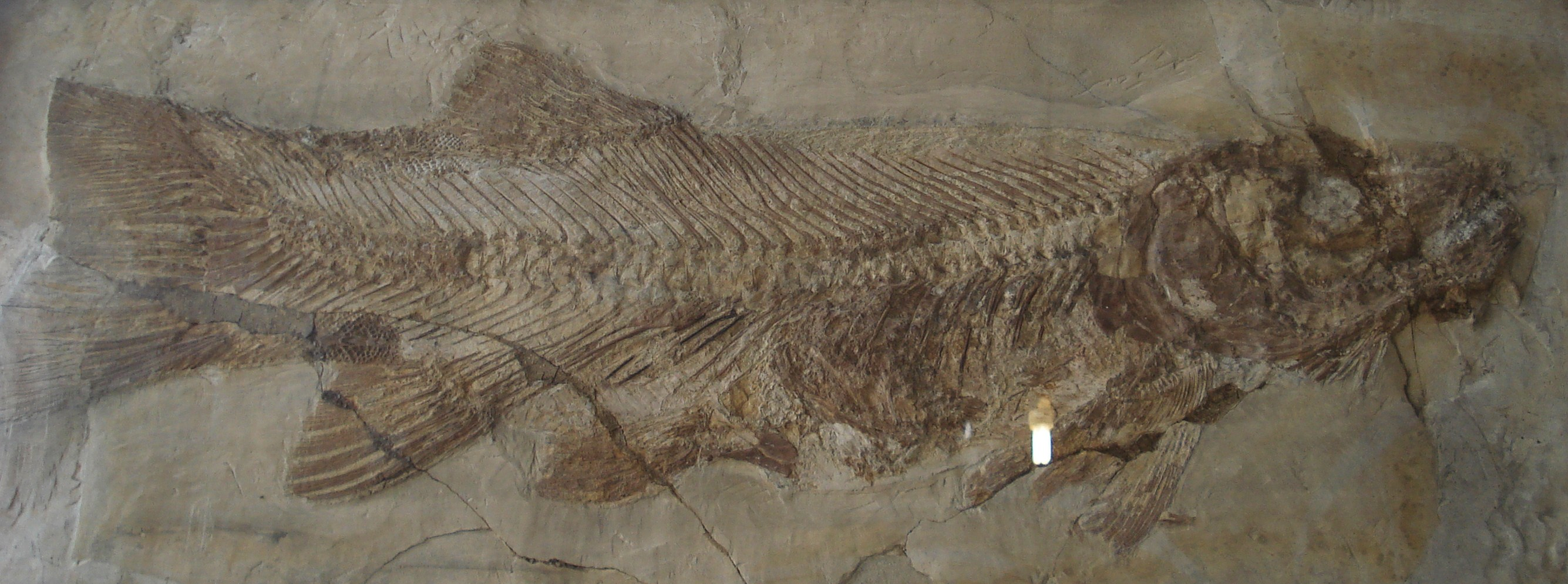
- Fossil specimen

Scientific classification
- Kingdom: Animalia
- Phylum: Chordata
- Class: Actinopterygii
- Clade: Halecomorphi
- Order: †Ionoscopiformes
- Genus: †Ainia; Jordan, 1919
- Species: †A. armata

Binomial name
- †Ainia armata (Wagner, 1846 [originally Lepidotus])

Synonyms
- Callopterus Thiollière, 1858 (nomen nudum)

= Ainia (fish) =

Ainia Temporal range: Late Kimmeridgian

Extinct genus of ray-finned fishes

Ainia is an extinct genus of prehistoric ray-finned fish that lived during the Kimmeridgian stage of the Late Jurassic epoch. It contains a single species, A. armata, known from the famous Solnhofen Limestone of Germany. It is a distant relative of the bowfin, although it is more closely related to genera such as Caturus and Osteorachis.

== See also ==
- List of prehistoric bony fish genera
