= Neorhombolepis =

Neorhombolepis Temporal range: Early Cretaceous

Scientific classification
- Kingdom: Animalia
- Phylum: Chordata
- Class: Actinopterygii
- Clade: Halecomorphi
- Order: Amiiformes
- Genus: †Neorhombolepis; Woodward, 1888

Extinct genus of fishes

Neorhombolepis is an extinct genus of prehistoric ray-finned fish that lived during the Early Cretaceous epoch.

== See also ==
- Prehistoric fish
- List of prehistoric bony fish
