= Allolepidotus =

Allolepidotus Temporal range: Late Ladinian

Scientific classification
- Kingdom: Animalia
- Phylum: Chordata
- Class: Actinopterygii
- Clade: Halecomorphi
- Order: †Ionoscopiformes
- Family: †Subortichthyidae
- Genus: †Allolepidotus; Deecke, 1889
- Species: †A. ruppelii

Binomial name
- †Allolepidotus ruppelii (Bellotti, 1857)

Synonyms
- Pholidophorus ruppelii Bellotti, 1857; Allolepidotus rueppelli (alternate spelling)

Extinct genus of ray-finned fishes

Allolepidotus ("different Lepidotes") is an extinct genus of prehistoric marine holostean ray-finned fish from the Middle Triassic of Italy. It contains a single species, A. ruppelii, from the late Ladinian-aged Perledo-Varenna Formation. It was formerly referred to the halecomorph order Panxianichthyiformes, but is now thought to be a member of the Ionoscopiformes. The misspelled specific epithet (which is sometimes amended to rueppelli in later studies) honors naturalist Eduard Rüppell.

The species A. bellottii was also formerly placed in this genus, but is now known to be a member of Eoeugnathus. The species A. nothosomoides, also placed in this genus, is now placed in its own genus, Perledovatus.

== See also ==
- Prehistoric fish
- List of prehistoric bony fish
