= Tungusichthys =

Tungusichthys Temporal range: Early Triassic

Scientific classification
- Domain: Eukaryota
- Kingdom: Animalia
- Phylum: Chordata
- Class: Actinopterygii
- Clade: Halecomorphi
- Order: Amiiformes
- Genus: †Tungusichthys; Berg, 1941

Extinct genus of fishes

Tungusichthys is an extinct genus of prehistoric bony fish that lived during the Early Triassic epoch.

== See also ==
- Prehistoric fish
- List of prehistoric bony fish
