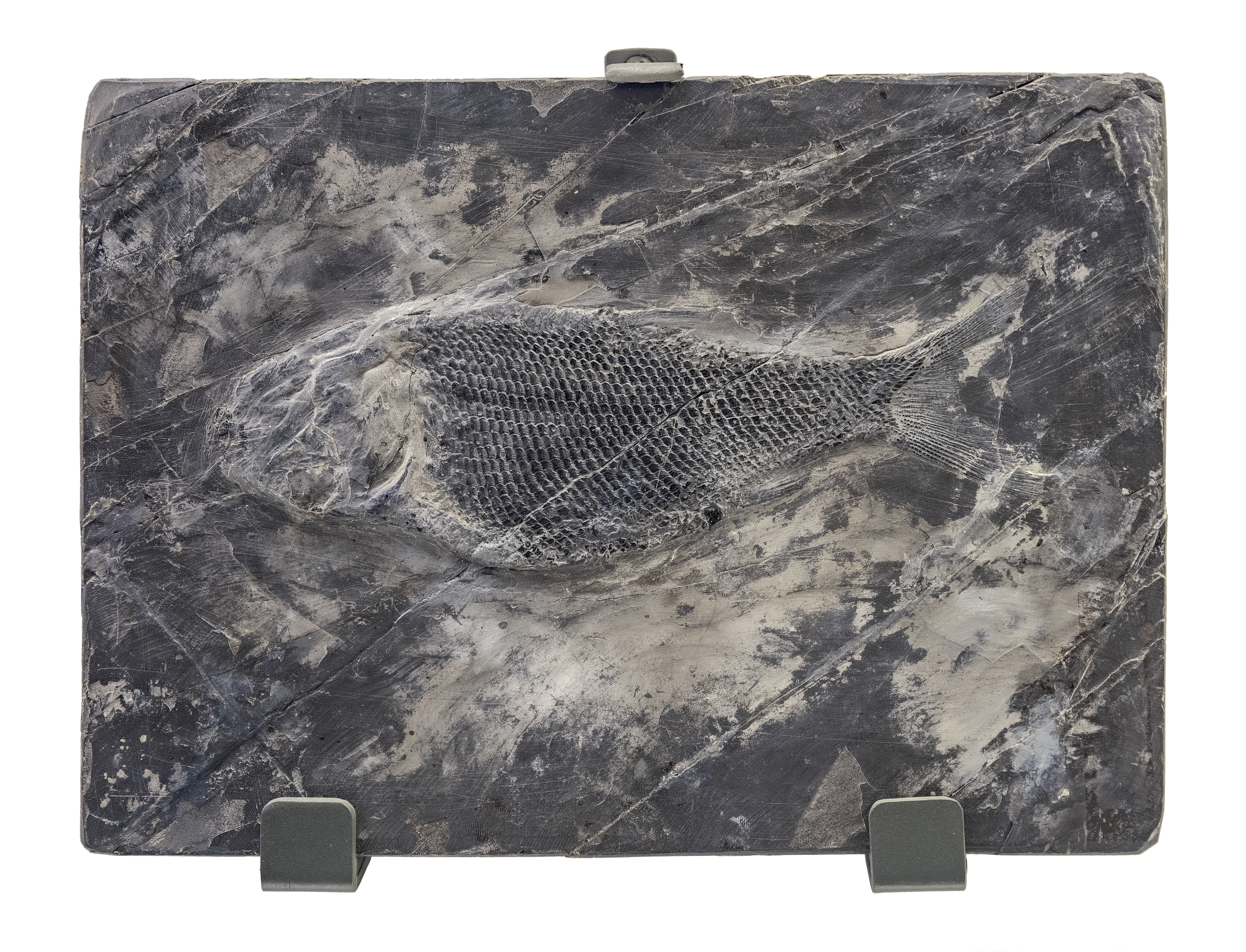
- A. shingyiensis fossil, National Taiwan Museum
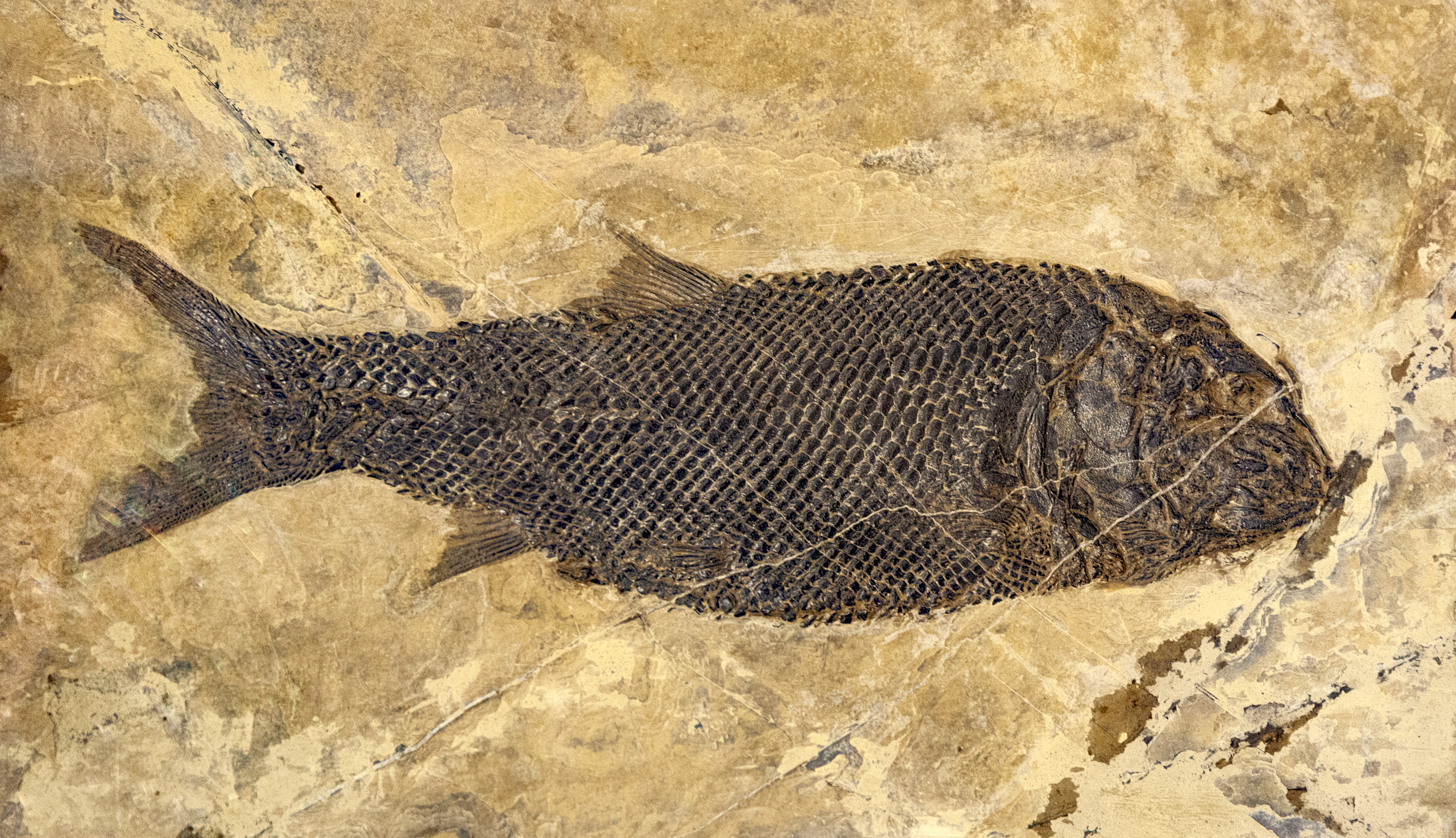
- Fossil assigned to A. sp., National Taiwan Museum

Scientific classification
- Domain: Eukaryota
- Kingdom: Animalia
- Phylum: Chordata
- Class: Actinopterygii
- Clade: Halecomorphi
- Order: †Ionoscopiformes
- Genus: †Asialepidotus; Su, 1959
- Species: †A. shingyiensis

Binomial name
- †Asialepidotus shingyiensis Su, 1959

= Asialepidotus =

Asialepidotus Temporal range: Middle Triassic

Extinct genus of fishes

Asialepidotus is an extinct genus of prehistoric marine ray-finned fish that lived during the Ladinian stage of the Middle Triassic epoch. It contains a single species, A. shingyiensis, from Guizhou, China.

Its affinities have long been controversial, although it is known to be a very distant relative of extant bowfin in the clade Halecomorphi. It was initially placed with the bowfins in Amiiformes, then Parasemionotiformes, then the paraphyletic group Panxianichthyiformes. More recent morphological studies have supported it being an early ionoscopiform.

== See also ==
- Prehistoric fish
- List of prehistoric bony fish
