= Leighiscus =

Leighiscus Temporal range: Late Triassic, 237–201.4 Ma

Scientific classification
- Kingdom: Animalia
- Phylum: Chordata
- Class: Actinopterygii
- Order: †Palaeonisciformes
- Genus: †Leighiscus; Wade, 1953
- Species: †L. hillsi

Binomial name
- †Leighiscus hillsi Wade, 1953

Extinct genus of fish

Leighiscus is an extinct genus of palaeonisciform ray-finned fish from South Australia. It is only known from the Leigh Creek Coal Measures located near Adelaide. The strata that the fish comes from date to the Late Triassic. Though only known from fragmentary material, it would have been a fish with thin scales and a reduced upper lobe of the tail.

== History and naming ==
Leighiscus is only known from a fragmentary holotype, SAM F15094, being a set of a part and counterpart of the caudal region of the fish. It is not known when the holotype was collected though it was found just above the coal at the K Cut of the Telford Basin. Leighiscus was the first vertebrate found at the coal measures along with the first Triassic fish found in South Australia. Later, two other fragmentary fish along with a stereospondyl were described many years later. The name Leighiscus refers to the holotype's locality, Leigh Creek. The species name "hillsi" is a reference to E. Sherbon Hills, a professor at Melbourne University at the time of description.

== Description ==
The tail of Leighiscus was largely homocercal with a reduced, most-likely short upper lobe though is incomplete. Even with this being the case, there are a total of 22-23 rays preserved though likely are missing the branching ends. The uppermost five rays along with the first two-three lower ones are sharp. These lower rays start short though increase in length down the length of the tail with the rest being longer and well-spaced. There is no segmentation on any of the rays outside of the last five rays. The dorsal fin is also incomplete, with only 3 rays being preserved, but would have been positioned in front of the anal fin which preserves the five last rays. These rays of the anal fin show no segmentation or branching.

A set of eight neural spines along with eight to ten haemal spines are preserved, these spines were long and had expanded proximal ends. The lower part of the tail also preserves 12 haemal elements which were strap-like in shape. Due to the fact that these spines are so visible in the fossil, it is suggested that Leighiscus possessed very small scales. There are impressions of what could have been scales throughout the specimen but the most notable of these are a set of 9 on the upper lobe of the tail which could represent the lateral line scales of the fish.

== Classification ==
The material of Leighiscus is too fragmentary to determine the affinities to any specific group of fish within palaeonisciformes. However, the more homocercal tail and the morphology of the haemal elements are stated to be comparable to what is seen in Ainia.

== Paleoenvironment ==
The strata that Leighiscus was found in represented a either fluvial or swamp environment.
