= Ainia =

Ainia may refer to:

- Ainia (fish), a prehistoric ray-finned fish genus
- Ainia (coral), a prehistoric hexacoral genus
