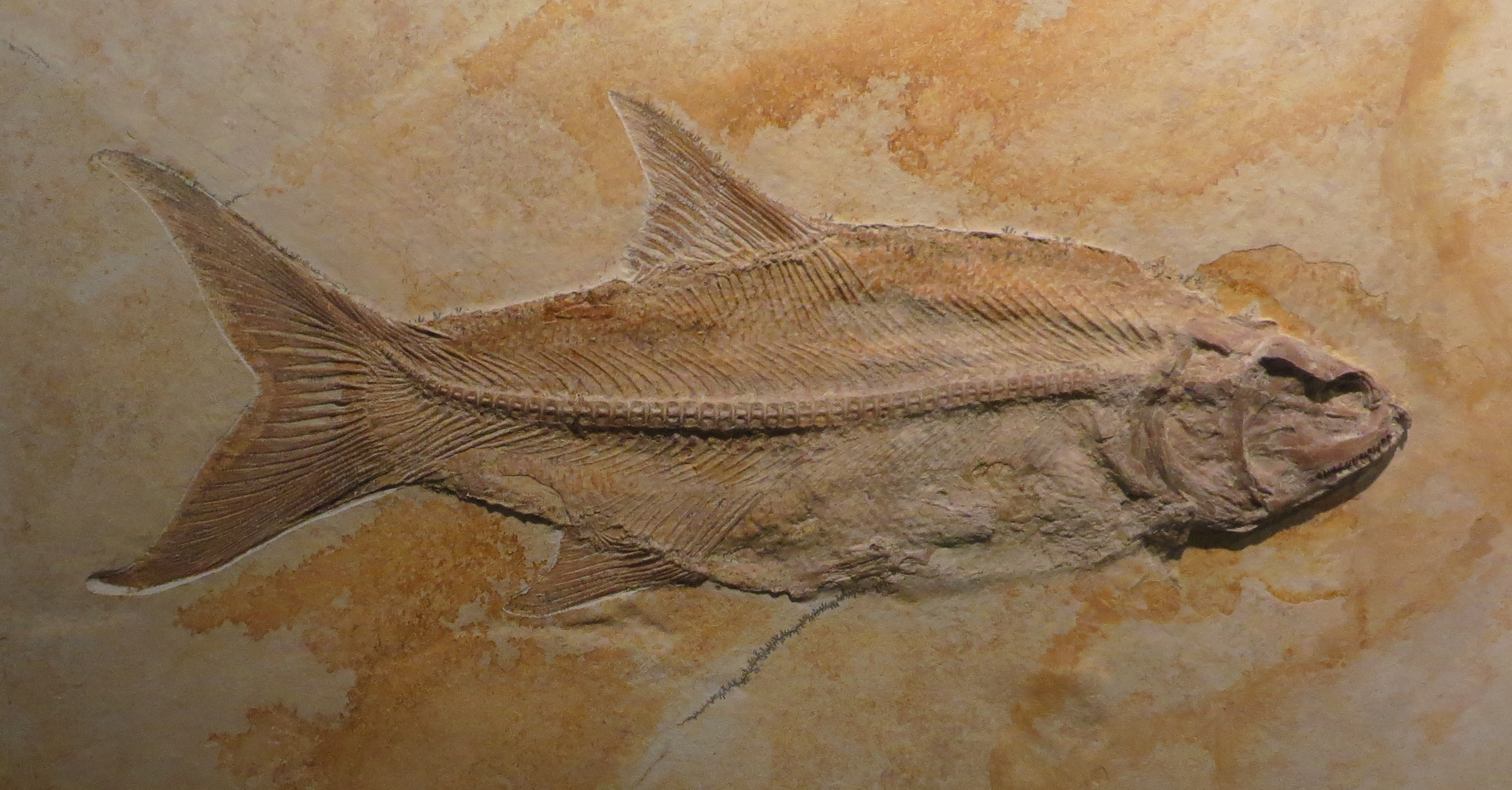
- A specimen of Ionoscopus the type genus of the order
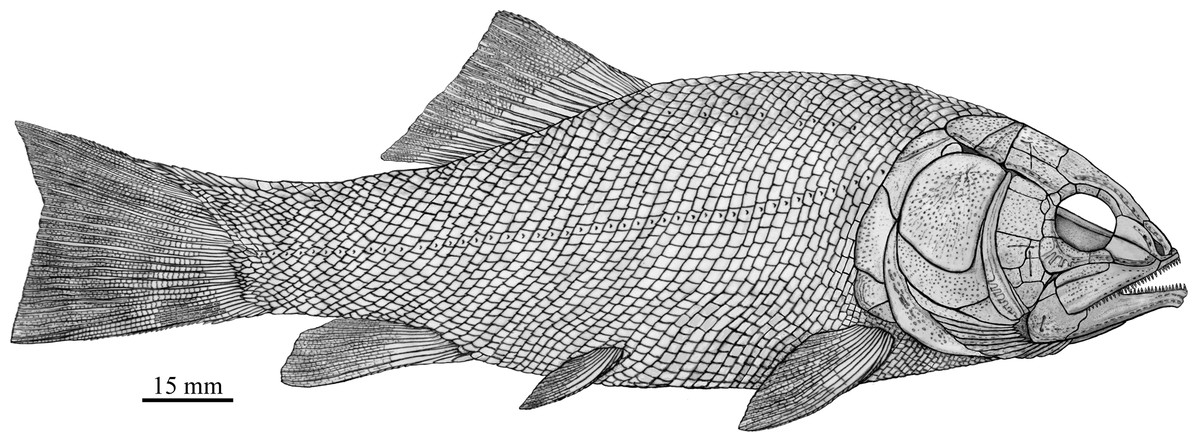
- A skeletal diagram of Robustichthys, an early member of the order

Scientific classification
- Kingdom: Animalia
- Phylum: Chordata
- Class: Actinopterygii
- Clade: Halecomorphi
- Order: †Ionoscopiformes; Grande & Bemis, 1998

Type genus
- †Ionoscopus Costa, 1853

Genera
- †Asialepidotus; †Brachyichthys; †Cerinichthys; †Elongofuro; †Heterolepidotus; †Holzmadenfuro; †Ohmdenfuro; †Ophiopsis; †Panxianichthys; †Schernfeldfuro; †Subortichthys; †Robustichthys; †Zandtfuro; †Furidae; †lonoscopidae; †Italophiopsidae; †Ophiosiellidae; †Subortichthyidae

= Ionoscopiformes =

Ionoscopiformes Temporal range: Ladinian–Albian

Extinct order of fishes

Ionoscopiformes is an extinct order of largely marine, ray-finned fish generally considered to be the sister group to Amiiformes, an order that contains the modern Bowfin. The earliest members of the order are found in Middle Triassic deposits in all continents besides Australia and Antarctica, showing that the group was very widespread even during this time. They would continue to diversify throughout the Jurassic and Cretaceous with the youngest records of the group being during the Albian. The order has had a complicated taxonomic history since the 2010s with authors suggesting that the group my not be monophyletic, instead separating members into Ionoscopiformes and Ophiopsiformes. However, more recent studies do find the group to be a true clade. Currently, the order contains four generally accepted families (Ionoscopidae, Italophiopsis, Ophiopsiellidae, and Subortichthyidae). A fifth family, Furidae, mentioned in the literature though some more recent papers consider it a synonym of what was once Ophiopsidae and it's generally not used in phylogenies focused on the group.

== History and classification ==
Even before the naming of Ionoscopiformes, the genera that make up the order would be closely placed to one another with the hypotheses by Maisey in 1991 along with Gardiner and coauthors in 1998. The order Ionoscopiformes would first be named by Lance Grande and William E. Bemis in a 1998 study focused on the phylogeny of Amiidae along with fish that clades close to it. Within this publication, the order would contain three families: lonoscopidae, Oshuniidae, and Ophiopsidae. Within the publication, Oshuniidae and Ophiopsidae are placed as sister groups to one another with lonoscopidae being the outgroup. During this time, all of the families were poorly understood with Ophiopsidae being the only one of the three to contain more than one genus. This poor understanding of these groups would come in the form of one of the three families, Oshuniidae, being made invalid due to the type genus and only member of the family, Oshunia, being reassigned to lonoscopidae. This grouping of two families within Ionoscopiformes would be generally accepted by most authors though papers such as one published by Machado in 2016 would begin to doubt if Ionoscopiformes was a true monophyletic clade. Below are the early phylogenic hypotheses mentioned.

Gardiner et al. (1996)

- Ionoscopidae + Ophiopsidae
  - Ionoscopus
  - - Oshunia
    - - Heterolepidotus
      - - Brachyichthys
        - - Macrepistius
          - Ophiopsis

Grande and Bemis (1998)

- Ionoscopiformes
  - Ionoscopidae
    Ionoscopus
  - - Oshunidae
      Oshunia
    - - Ophiopsidae
        - Macrepistius
        - Ophiopsis

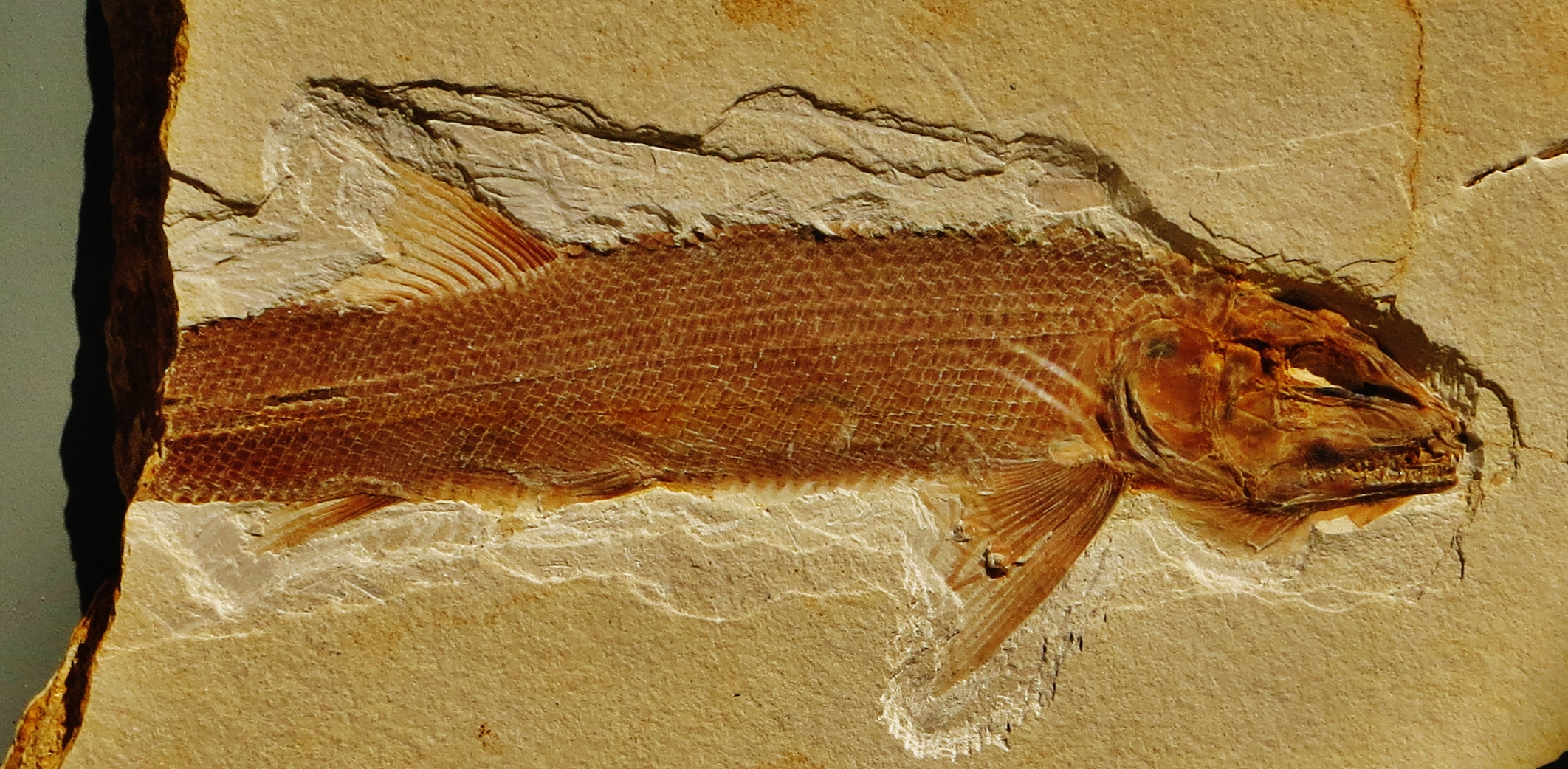
A specimen of Ophiopsis, a fish originally placed within what was once Ophiopsidae though is now Ophiopsiellidae since the genus was moved out of the family.

The monophyly of Ionoscopiformes was questioned by a 2018 publication by Adriana López-Arbarello and Emilia Sferco who argued it due to the extreme differences between studies, putting forward that Ionoscopidae and Ophiopsidae are not sister groups as had generally been accepted at the time. Another 2018 paper by Martin Ebert would echo this statement, placing Ionoscopidae at the base of Amiiformes and coining a new clade Ophiopsiformes as a new name for the order containing Ophiopsiellidae, a newly coined name for Ophiopsidae due to the fact that Ophiopsis was found to not be a true member of the family. This would be countered in a publication by Guang-Hui Xu the next year that found a closer relationship between the two families, keeping both within Ionoscopiformes as pre-2018 papers had done. More recent papers such as the 2020 paper by Adriana López-Arbarello and coauthors do find Ionoscopiformes containing both lonoscopidae and Ophiopsiellidae as a true clade. This clade is considered to be the sister group to Amiiformes with the clade formed between the two orders being the sister group to the non-monophyletic 'Panxianichthiformes'. Below are the phylogenic hypotheses mentioned with Ionoscopiformes and Ophiopsiformes being shown as two separate orders where applicable.

Ebert (2018)

- - Atractosteus spatula
  - - Dorsetichthys bechei
    - - Watsonulus eugnathus
      - - - - Allolepidotus bellottii
            - Eoeugnathus megalepis
          - - Paxianichthys imparilis
            - Robustichthys luopingensis
        - - - - Cerinichthys koelblae
              - - Heterolepidotus latus
                - Brachyichthys typicus
            - - Furo orthostomus
              - Ophiopsidae
          - - Ionoscopidae
            - - Ionoscopus petrarojae
              - - Amiiformes

Xu (2019)

- - Pteronisculus stensioi
  - - Teffichthys madagascariensis
    - - Teleostei
      - - Ticinolepis longaeva
        - - Kyphosichthyiformes
          - - - Sangiorgioichthys aldae
              - Sangiorgioichthys valmarensis
            - - Semionotiformes
              - - Lepisosteiformes
                - - Watsonulus eugnathoides
                  - - Ionoscopiformes
                    - - Amiiformes

López-Arbarello et al. (2020)

- - Pteronisculus stensioi
  - - Teffichthys madagascariensis
    - - Ginglymodi
      - - Ionoscopiformes
        - Amiiformes

=== Internal relationships ===
Though still controversial, there have been multiple papers describing ionoscopiforms that include phylogenies in more recent years such as in publications like the 2020 paper by López-Arbarello et al. and the 2019 paper by Xu, not many papers put a focus on the topic. The most recent paper to tackle with would be within a 2020 publication by Tamara El Hossny and coauthors that would test that phylogenic relationship between the members of the group along with the evolutionary history of Ionoscopiformes based on their cladogram. All three of these publications would find generally similar results with taxa such as Robustichthys, Asoalepidotus, Panxianichthys, and Subortichthys forming the outgroup before the main split between Ophiopsiellidae and Ionoscopidae. A new family Subortichthyidae would be coined in 2023 and would contain Allolepidotus, Eoeugnathus, Sinoeugnathus, and Subortichthys. Previously, another new family was established in 2017 by Louis Taverne and Luigi Capasso based on their newly described genus Italophiopsis though neither the genus or family have been referenced in later publications on the order. Below are the cladograms from the publications mentioned.

López-Arbarello et al. (2020)

- - Watsonulus eugnathoides
  - - Ionoscopiformes
      - Sanctusichthys rieteri
      - Subortichthys triassicus
      - Panxianichthys imparilis
      - - Asialepidotus shingyiensis
        - - Robustichthys luopingensis
          - - Cerinichthys koelblae
            - - Ophiopsis muensteri
              - - Heterolepidotus latus
                - - - - Congophiopsis lepersonnei
                      - Ophiopsiella procera
                      - - Teoichthys kallistos
                        - Macrepistius arenatus
                    - - Oschunia brevis
                      - - Ionoscopus cyprinoides
                        - Quetzalichthys perrilliatae

El Hossny et al. (2020)

- - Watsonulus eugnathoides
  - - Ionoscopiformes
      - Sanctusichthys rieteri
      - - Subortichthys triassicus
        - - Asialepidotus shingyiensis
          - - Robustichthys luopingensis
            - - Cerinichthys koelblae
              - - Ophiopsis muensteri
                - - Heterolepidotus latus
                  - - Ophiopsiellidae
                      - Congophiopsis lepersonnei
                      - Ophiopsiella procera
                      - - Teoichthys kallistos
                        - Macrepistius arenatus
                    - - Ionoscopidae
                        - Oschunia brevis
                        - - Quetzalichthys perrilliatae
                          - - 'Ionoscopus' cyprinoides
                            - - Ionoscopus petrarojae
                              - Spathiurus dorsalis

Feng et al. (2023)

- - Watsonulus eugnathoides
  - - - Allolepidotus bellottii
      - - Eoeugnathus megalepis
        - - Sinoeugnathus kueichowensis
          - Subortichthys triassicus
    - - Panxianichthys imparilis
      - - Asialepidotus shingyiensis
        - - Robustichthys luopingensis
          - - Cerinichthys koelblae
            - - Ophiopsis muensteri
              - - Heterolepidotus latus
                - - - Congophiopsis lepersonnei
                    - Ophiopsiella procera
                    - - Teoichthys kallistos
                      - Macrepistius arenatus
                  - - Oschunia brevis
                    - - Ionoscopus cyprinoides
                      - Quetzalichthys perrilliatae

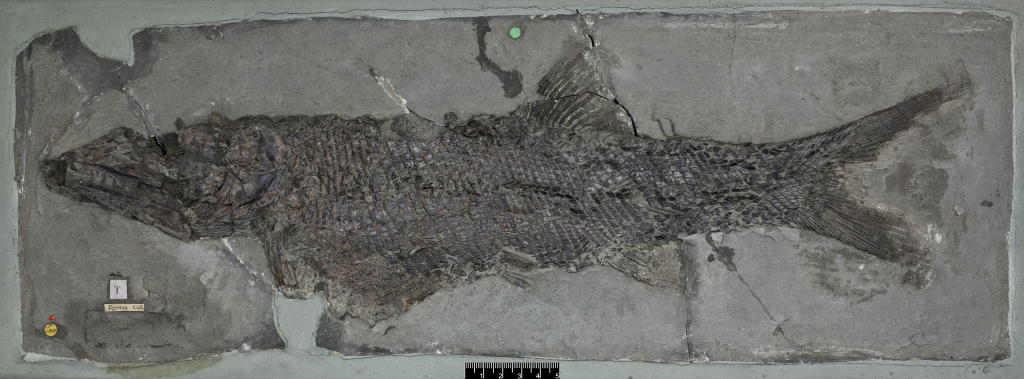
A specimen of Furo, a genus of fish usually placed within Ionoscopiformes in the family Furidae

Another group rarely mentioned in the literature when mentioning ionoscopiforms is Furidae which has been referred to as 'ophiopsiforms' with short dorsal fins. This included the genera Heterolepidotus, Furo, Ophiopsis, and Brachyichthys. Though this group is mentioned every once and awhile, Guang-Hui Xu states that the family is a synonym of 'Ophiopsidae' which is now referred to as Ophiopsiellidae as stated earlier. Even with this being the case, the family is still mentioned in a few papers since then such as the publication such as the 2023 publication by López-Arbarello and coauthors.

== Evolutionary history ==
The earliest record of Ionoscopiformes is during the middle Triassic with these including genera like Panxianichthys and Robustichthys along with members of the family Subortichthyidae. Even at this point, the group ranged throughout what is now Asia, Europe, Africa, North America, and South America. Almost all middle Triassic members of the group would have been marine with the one exception to this being the genus Congophiopsis. Though a large amount of ionoscopiforms from this time have been found in China, authors push against this being to region of origin of the group due to the possibility of bias relating to the high amount of middle Triassic assemblages found in South China. The diversification of the group would continue into the Late Jurassic with members being much more common in Europe than in the Triassic. By the Early Cretaceous, members of the families lonoscopidae and Ophiopsiellidae would begin to be seen in both North and South America. Currently, the youngest generally agreed upon record of the group is the genus Spathiurus from the upper Cenomanian of Lebanon. A younger genus, Agoultichthys, has been argued to be a member of the family in the 2018 paper by Ebert though this has been questioned in more recent years. If it is truly a member of the group, it would mean that the earliest record of the order would be in the Turonian.
