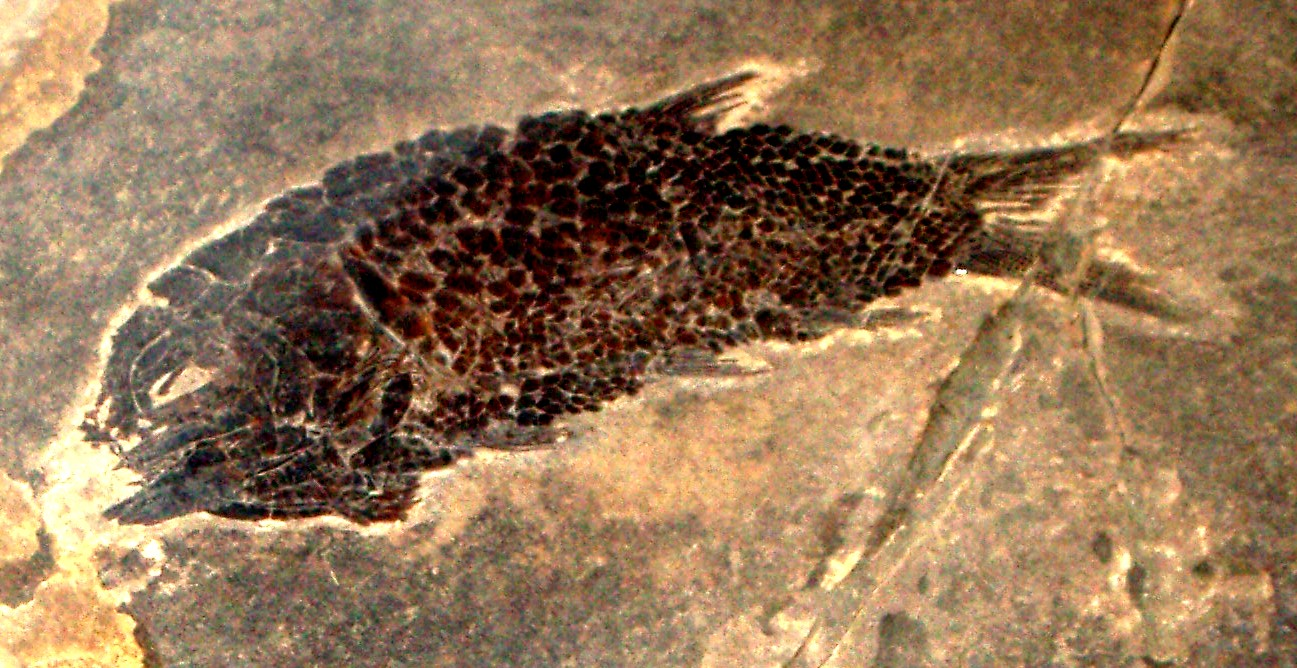
- E. megalepis specimen, Milan Natural History Museum

Scientific classification
- Kingdom: Animalia
- Phylum: Chordata
- Class: Actinopterygii
- Clade: Halecomorphi
- Order: †Ionoscopiformes
- Family: †Subortichthyidae
- Genus: †Eoeugnathus; Brough, 1939

Type species
- †Eoeugnathus megalepis Brough, 1939

Species
- E. bellottii (Rueppel, 1857); E. megalepis Brough, 1939

= Eoeugnathus =

Eoeugnathus Temporal range: Anisian-Ladinian

Extinct genus of fishes

Eoeugnathus (Greek for "dawn true-jaw") is an extinct genus of prehistoric marine ray-finned fish belonging to the Halecomorphi. Eoeugnathus existed during the Middle Triassic in what is now Europe.

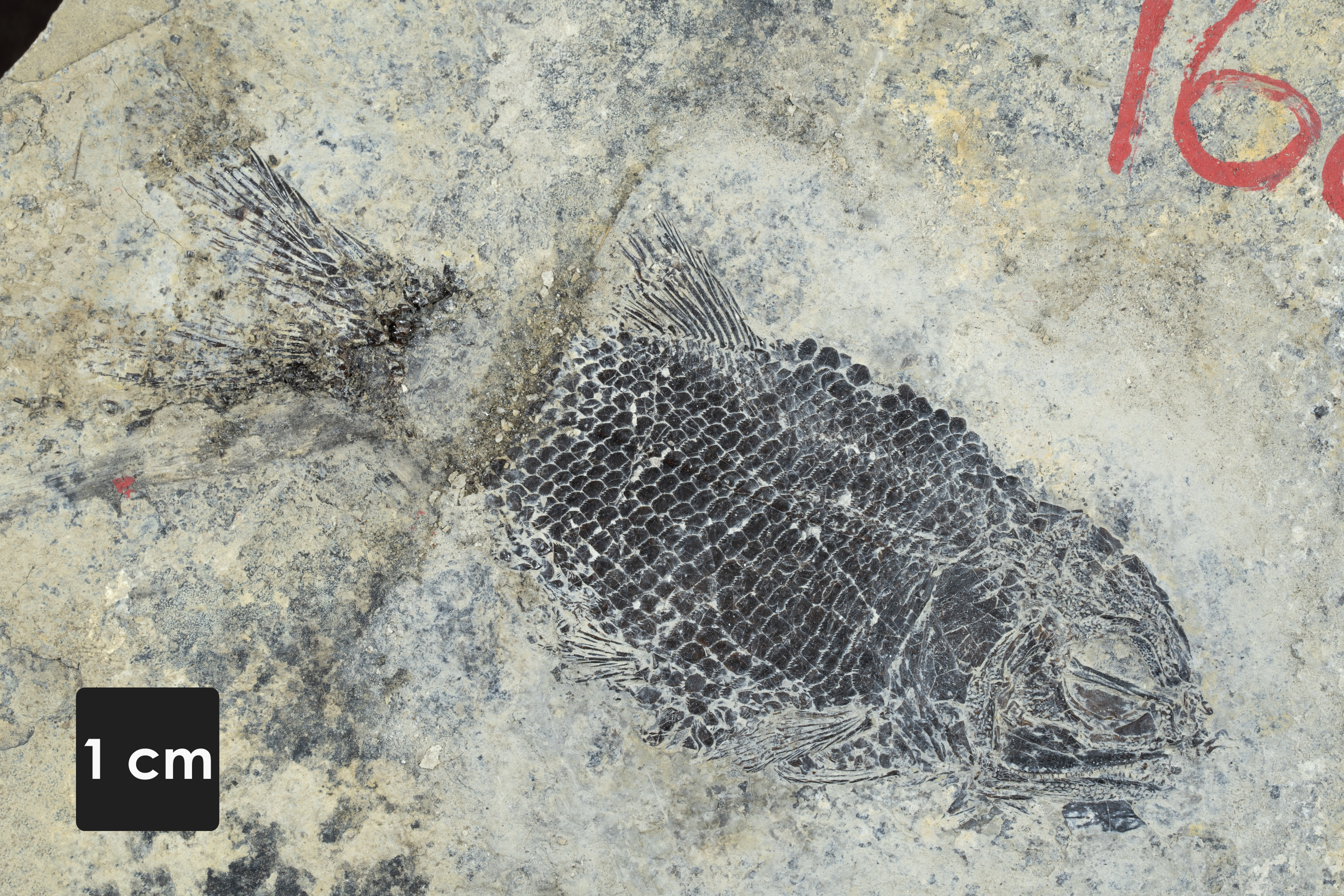
E. belliotti specimen, Civico Museo Insubrico di Storia Naturale

It contains two species:

- E. bellottii (Rueppel, 1857) - Ladinian of Italy and Switzerland (Meride Formation, Perledo-Varenna Formation) (=Allolepidotus bellottii Rueppel, 1857)
- E. megalepis Brough, 1939 (type species) - latest Anisian to late Ladinian of Italy (Besano Formation), Switzerland (Prosanto Formation), and Spain (Muschelkalk)

It was initially placed in the Caturidae and then the Panxianichthyiformes, but more recent studies have placed it in the new ionoscopiform family Subortichthyidae.

== See also ==
- Prehistoric fish
- List of prehistoric bony fish
