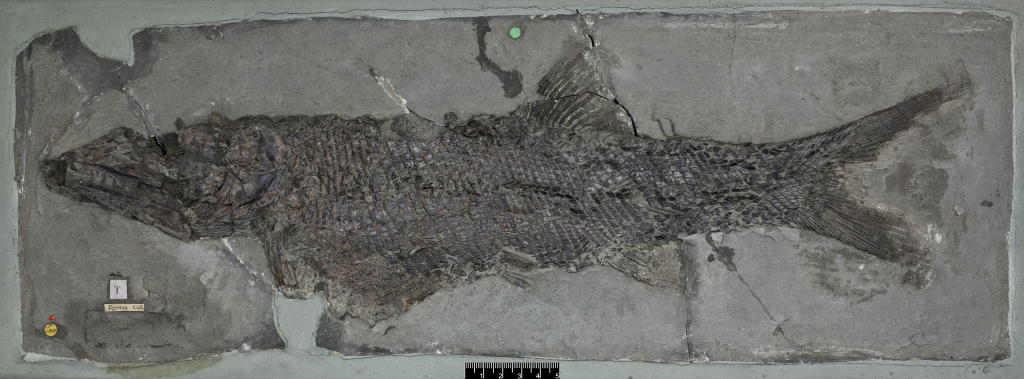
- Specimen of Furo orthostomus

Scientific classification
- Kingdom: Animalia
- Phylum: Chordata
- Class: Actinopterygii
- Clade: Halecomorphi
- Order: †Ophiopsiformes
- Family: †Furidae
- Genus: †Furo; Gistel, 1848

Type species
- †Eugnathus orthostomus Agassiz, 1845 vide Agassiz, 1833

Species
- †F. orthostomus (Agassiz, 1842); †F. philpotiae (Agassiz, 1839); See text for other species no longer classified in this genus

Synonyms
- Eugnathus Agassiz, 1843 (preoccupied)

= Furo (fish) =

Furo Temporal range: Early Jurassic (Sinemurian) 199.5–192.9 Ma Possible Late Triassic to Late Jurassic occurrence

Extinct genus of ray-finned fishes

Furo is an extinct genus of marine ray-finned fish, belonging to the order Ophiopsiformes or Ionoscopiformes, known from the Early Jurassic of England and Italy. Other species from throughout Europe, from the Late Triassic to Late Jurassic, have been previously placed in this genus.

== Taxonomy ==
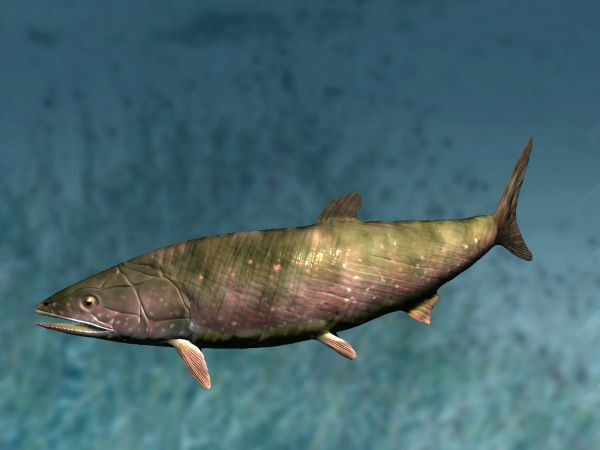
Life restoration

The type species of Furo, F. orthostomus, was originally named Eugnathus by the Swiss naturalist Louis Agassiz in 1843, but the genus name was changed to Furo by Johannes von Nepomuk Franz Xaver Gistel in 1848 because Eugnathus was preoccupied by the beetle genus Eugnatha. A number of species referred to Furo have been found in the Solnhofen Formation of Bavaria. The type species of Ophiopsis, O. muensteri, was mistakenly referred to Furo by some authors, but recent studies have indicated that the Furo and Ophiopsis type species are distantly related.

The following two species are the only definitive members of this genus:

- †F. orthostomus (Agassiz, 1842) - Early Jurassic (Sinemurian) of England (Blue Lias)
- †F. philpotae (Agassiz, 1839) - Early Jurassic (Sinemurian) of England (Blue Lias) (named after Elizabeth Philpot, who discovered the type specimen)

An indeterminate species of Furo is known from the concurrent Moltrasio Formation of Italy.

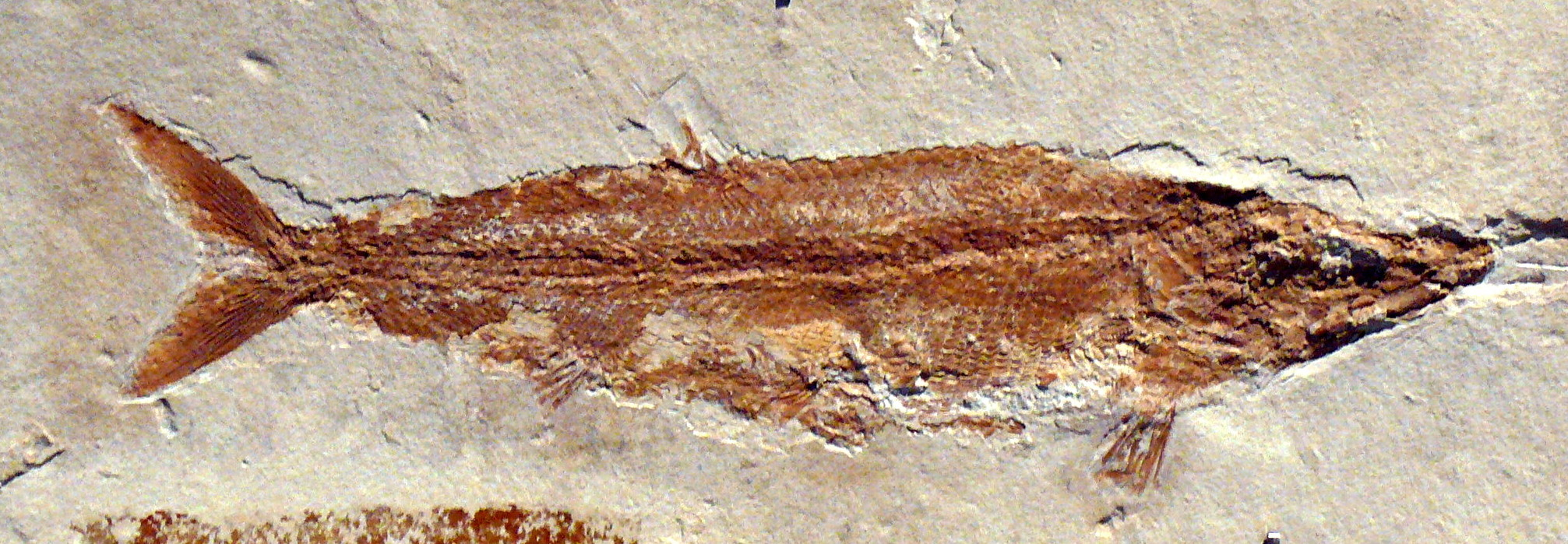
Fossil of 'F.' microlepidotes, a species no longer placed in this genus

The following species, previously classified into Furo, are considered valid taxa but likely do not belong in Furo, and need to be classified into their own genera:

- †F. aldingeri (Heimberg, 1949) - Late Jurassic (Kimmeridgian) of Germany (Nusplingen Limestone)
- †F. angustus (Münster, 1842) - Late Jurassic (Tithonian) of Germany (Mörnsheim Formation & Solnhofen Formation)
- ?†F. fasciculatus (Agassiz in Woodward, 1895b) - Early Jurassic (Toarcian) of England (Whitby Mudstone)
- †F. insignis (Kner, 1866) - Late Triassic (Norian) of Austria (Seefelder Formation)
- †F. latimanus (Agassiz, 1834) - Tithonian of Germany (Solnhofen Formation)
- †F. longiserratus (Agassiz, 1843) - Tithonian of Germany (Solnhofen Formation)
- †F. microlepidotes (Agassiz, 1833) - Tithonian of Germany (Solnhofen Formation)
- †F. normandica Wenz, 1968 - Toarcian of Normandy, France
