= Liodesmus =

Liodesmus Temporal range: Early Tithonian

Scientific classification
- Kingdom: Animalia
- Phylum: Chordata
- Class: Actinopterygii
- Clade: Halecomorphi
- Order: †Ophiopsiformes
- Genus: †Liodesmus; Wagner, 1859
- Species: †L. gracilis

Binomial name
- †Liodesmus gracilis (Agassiz, 1838)

Synonyms
- Pholidophorus gracilis Agassiz, 1838

Extinct genus of ray-finned fishes

Liodesmus is a dubious genus of extinct marine ray-finned fish that lived during the Tithonian stage of the Late Jurassic epoch. It contains a single species, L. gracilis (initially described in the genus Pholidophorus) from the Solnhofen Limestone of Germany, which is also considered the only member of the dubious family Liodesmidae. The type specimen of L. gracilis is poorly-preserved & its taxonomic affinity is uncertain, and later studies have thus found it to be a nomen dubium, although based on anatomy, it appears to belong to the Ophiopsiformes.

Specimen of Nasrinsotoudehichthys (previously Liodesmus sprattiformis)

Several species formerly assigned to this genus are now considered distinct taxa. A species of Caturus, C. brevicostatus, was long conflated with and considered synonymous with L. gracilis, but more recent studies have clarified its distinctiveness from the type specimen of L. gracilis. A second species of Liodesmus, L. sprattiformis, was previously recognized, but later studies identified it as being an early-diverging member of the Caturoidea, and described it in its own genus, Nasrinsotoudehichthys.
