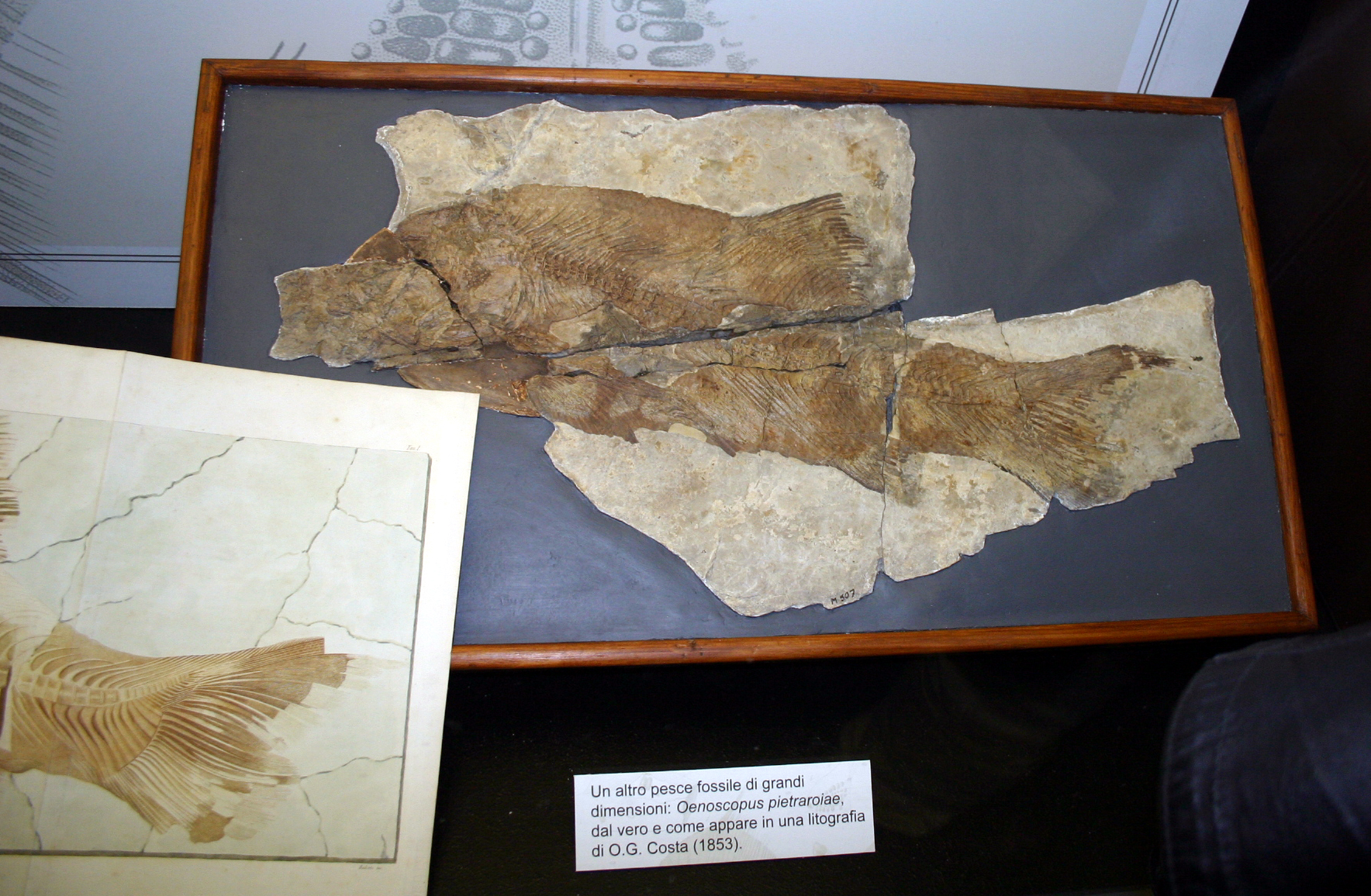
- Specimen of I. petrarojae

Scientific classification
- Kingdom: Animalia
- Phylum: Chordata
- Class: Actinopterygii
- Clade: Halecomorphi
- Order: †Ionoscopiformes
- Family: †Ionoscopidae
- Genus: †Ionoscopus; Costa, 1853

Species
- See text

= Ionoscopus =

Ionoscopus Temporal range: Kimmeridgian to Albian

Extinct genus of ray-finned fishes

Ionoscopus is an extinct genus of marine halecomorph ray-finned fish from the Late Jurassic to Early Cretaceous of Europe. It is the type genus of the order Ionoscopiformes, a diverse group of halecomorph fish from the Mesozoic that were distantly related to the modern bowfin.

The following species are known:

- ?I. analibrevis Stuetzer, 1972 - Late Jurassic (Tithonian) of Germany (Solnhofen Formation)
- I. desori (Thiollière, 1858) - Late Jurassic (Kimmeridgian) of France (Cerin Lagerstätte)
- ?I. muensteri (Giebel, 1848) - Tithonian of Germany (Solnhofen Formation)
- I. petrarojae Costa, 1853 (type species) - Early Cretaceous (Albian) of Italy (Pietraroja Plattenkalk)
- ?I. striatissimus (Münster, 1842) - Tithonian of Germany (Solnhofen Formation)

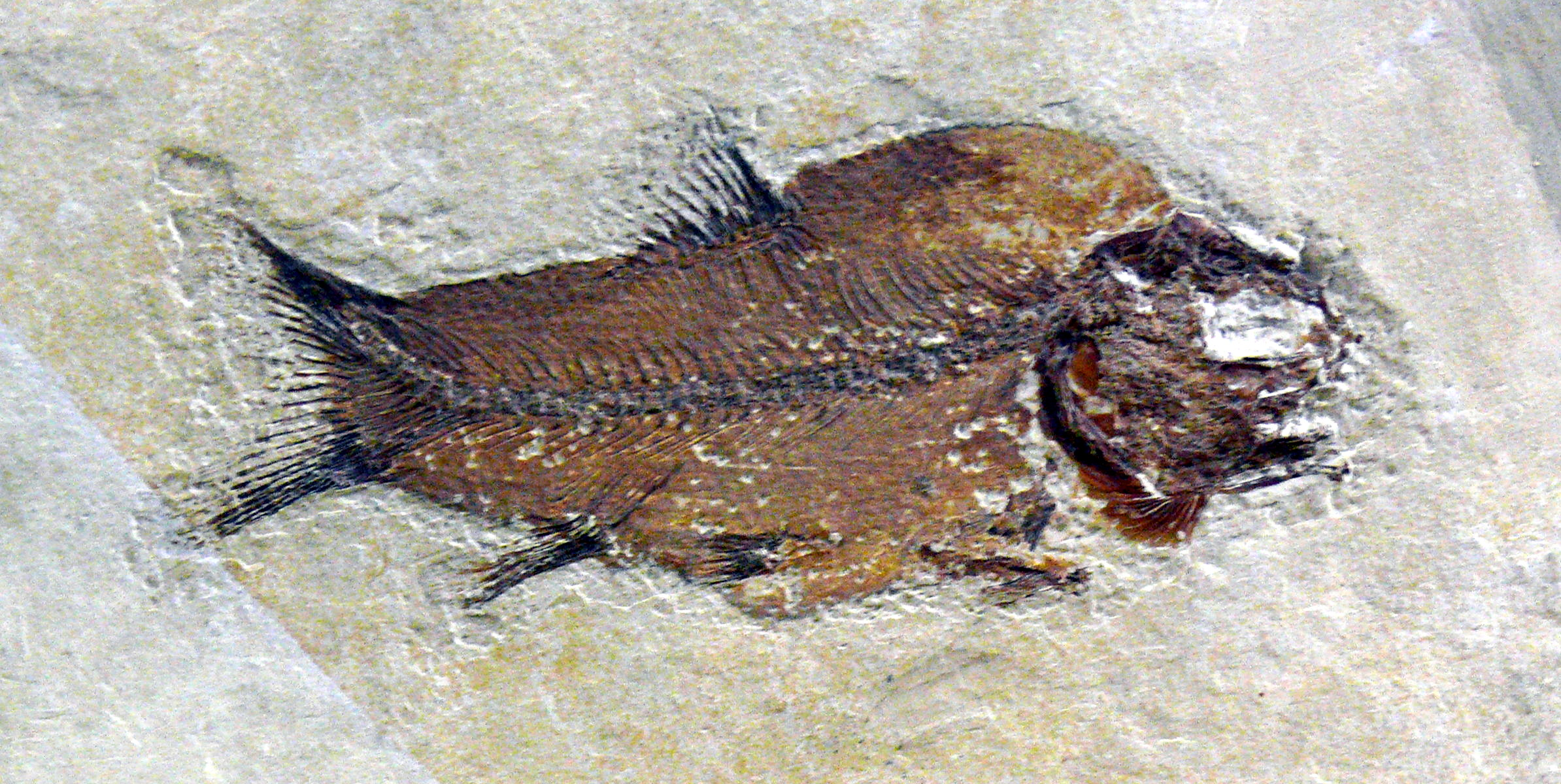
I. analibrevis, a species debatably placed in this genus

In a 2016 review, both I. desori and I. petrarojae were identified as the only definitively valid members of the genus. Three other German species were found to have remains too poorly-preserved or less-studied to allow for a proper taxonomic assignment. 'I.' cyprinoides (Wagner, 1863), a well-known species from the Late Jurassic of Germany, was found to be morphologically distinct from Ionoscopus and warrant reclassification into its own genus.

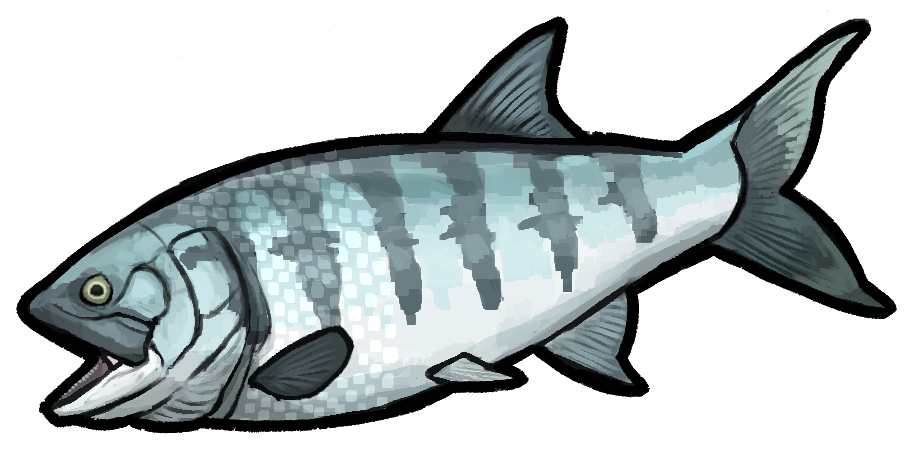
Reconstruction of 'Ionoscopus' cyprinoides

The closest relative of Ionoscopus is thought to be Quetzalichthys from the Early Cretaceous of Mexico.
