= Sinoeugnathus =

Scientific classification
- Domain: Eukaryota
- Kingdom: Animalia
- Phylum: Chordata
- Class: Actinopterygii
- Clade: Halecomorphi
- Order: Amiiformes
- Genus: †Sinoeugnathus; Su, 1959

Extinct genus of fishes

Sinoeugnathus is an extinct genus of prehistoric ray-finned fish.

== See also ==
- Prehistoric fish
- List of prehistoric bony fish
