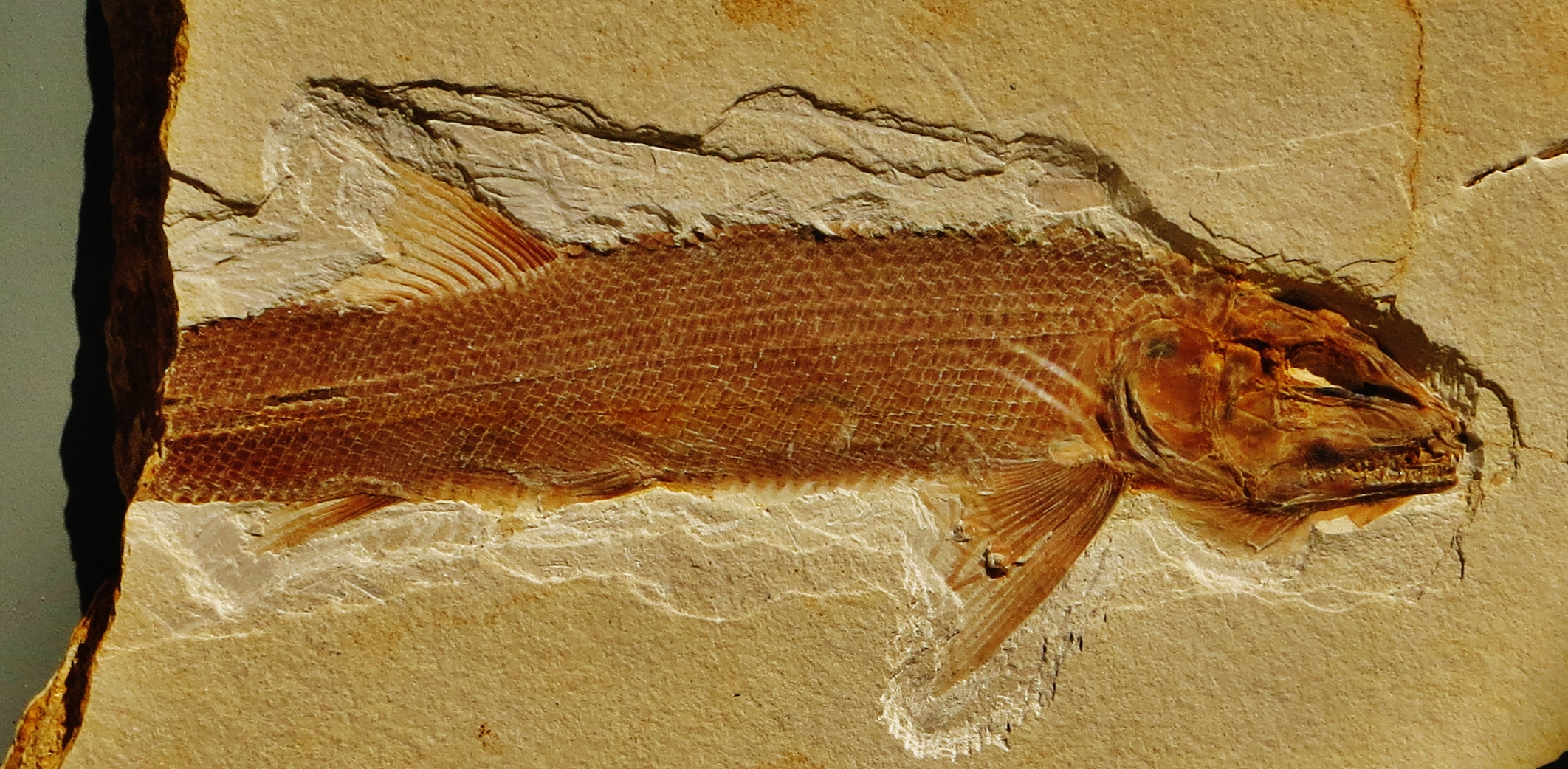
- Ophiopsis muensteri fossil

Scientific classification
- Kingdom: Animalia
- Phylum: Chordata
- Class: Actinopterygii
- Clade: Halecomorphi
- Order: †Ionoscopiformes
- Family: †Ophiopsidae
- Genus: †Ophiopsis; Agassiz, 1834

Type species
- †Ophiopsis muensteri Agassiz, 1834

= Ophiopsis =

Extinct genus of fishes

Ophiopsis is an extinct genus of prehistoric ray-finned fish belonging to the family Ophiopsidae. Specimens are known from the Tithonian-age Solnhofen Formation of Bavaria, Germany.

== Taxonomy ==
The type species, Ophiopsis muensteri, was previously placed in Furo by several authors who mistakenly considered Ophiopsiella procera the Ophiopsis type species. However, Lane and Ebert (2015) noted that Ophiopsis originally included O. muensteri only when first erected by Agassiz (1834), so they re-assigned procera and some Ophiopsis species to the new genus Ophiopsiella.

== See also ==
- Prehistoric fish
- List of prehistoric bony fish
