= Macrepistius =

Macrepistius Temporal range: Albian

Scientific classification
- Kingdom: Animalia
- Phylum: Chordata
- Class: Actinopterygii
- Clade: Halecomorphi
- Order: Amiiformes
- Genus: †Macrepistius; Cope, 1894

Type species
- †Macrepistius arenatus Cope, 1894

Extinct genus of fishes

Macrepistius is an extinct genus of prehistoric ray-finned fish that lived during the Albian stage of the Early Cretaceous epoch. It is known from the Lower Cretaceous marine deposits of the Glen Rose Formation in north-central Texas, and measured 30 cm long.

== See also ==
- Prehistoric fish
- List of prehistoric bony fish
