= Oshunia =

Oshunia Temporal range: Albian ~112–106 Ma

Scientific classification
- Domain: Eukaryota
- Kingdom: Animalia
- Phylum: Chordata
- Class: Actinopterygii
- Order: †Pachycormiformes
- Family: †Ionoscopidae
- Genus: †Oshunia; Wenz & Kellner 1986

Type species
- †Oshunia brevis Wenz and Kellner 1986

Extinct genus of ray-finned fish

Oshunia is an extinct genus of ray-finned fish that lived during the Albian. Fossils of the genus were found in the Romualdo Formation of the Araripe Basin, northeastern Brazil. Other authors assign a Cenomanian age to the fish.
