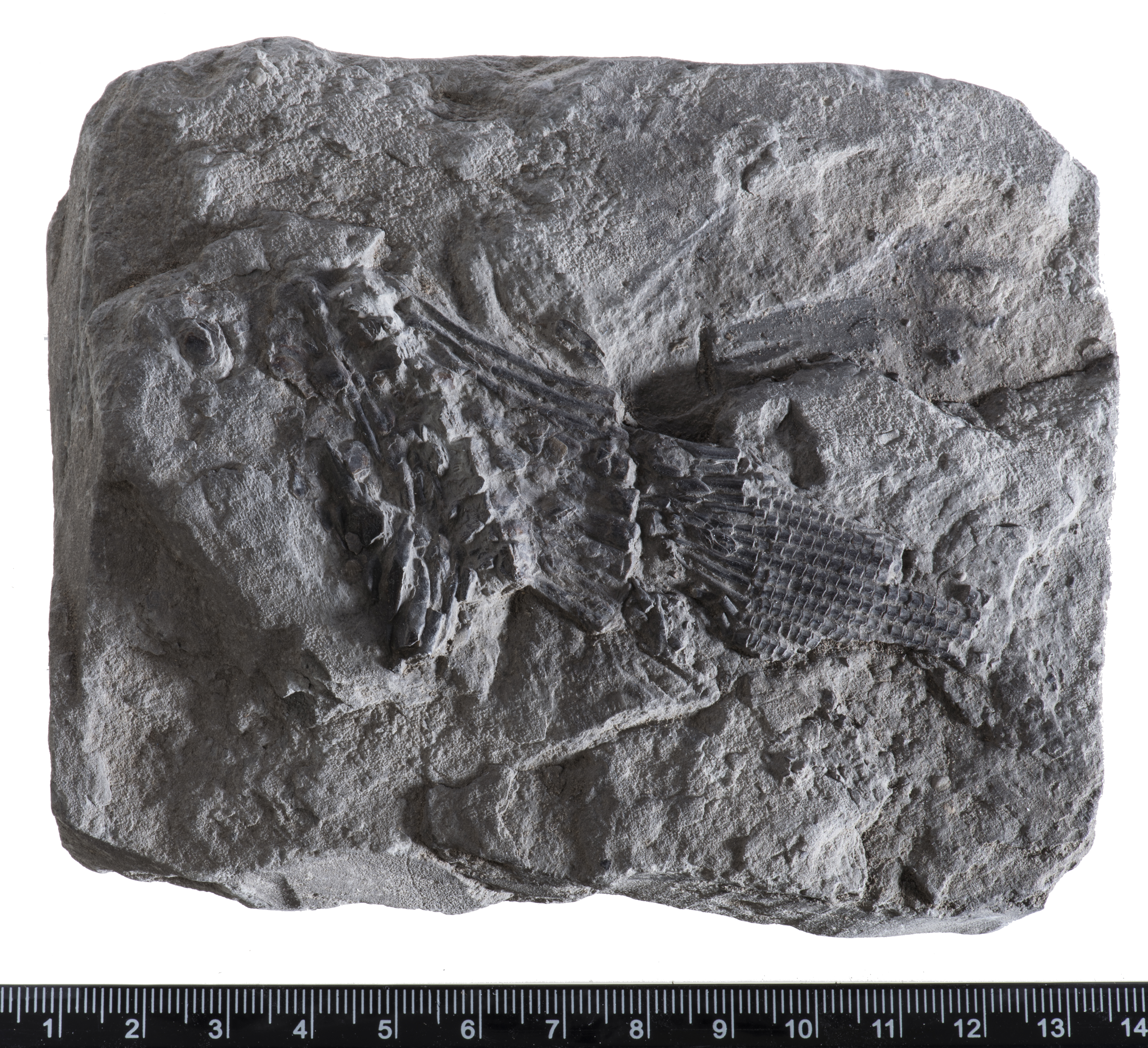
- An osteorachis fossil in the collections of the Museum of Natural History of Neuchâtel

Scientific classification
- Kingdom: Animalia
- Phylum: Chordata
- Class: Actinopterygii
- Clade: Halecomorphi
- Order: Amiiformes
- Genus: †Osteorachis; Egerton, 1868

= Osteorachis =

Extinct genus of fishes

Osteorachis is an extinct genus of prehistoric ray-finned fish.

== See also ==
- Prehistoric fish
- List of prehistoric bony fish
