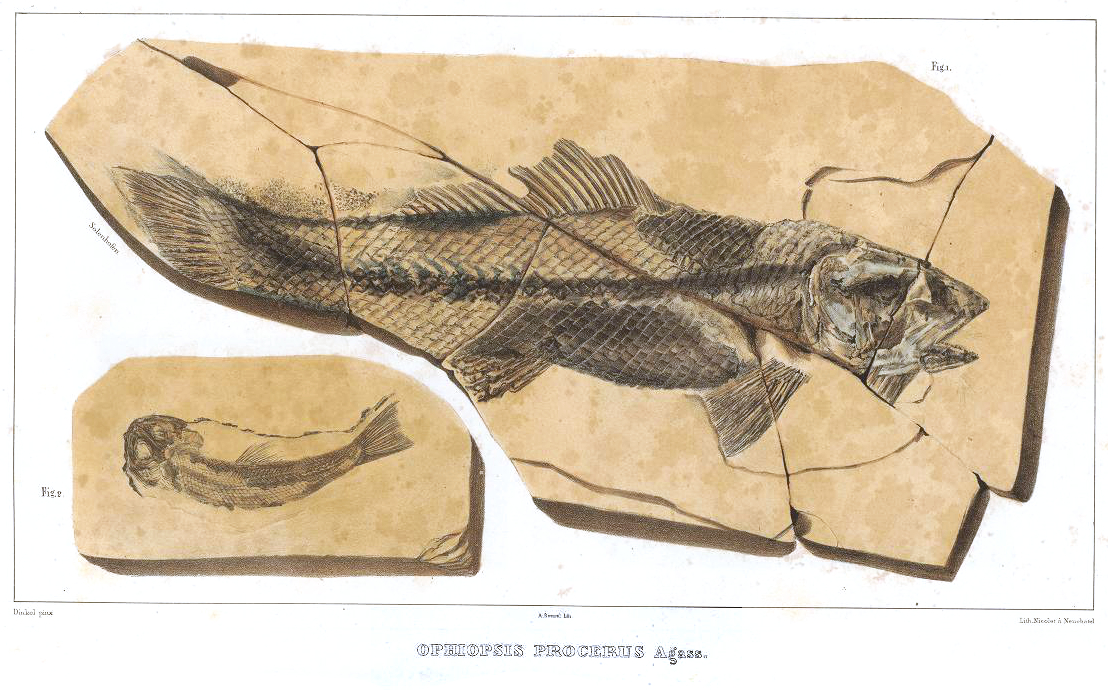
- Ophiopsiella procera

Scientific classification
- Kingdom: Animalia
- Phylum: Chordata
- Class: Actinopterygii
- Clade: Halecomorphi
- Order: †Ophiopsiformes
- Family: †Ophiopsiellidae
- Genus: †Ophiopsiella; Lane & Ebert, 2015

Type species
- Ophiopsiella procera Agassiz, 1844

Synonyms
- Eusemius Vetter, 1881

= Ophiopsiella =

Ophiopsiella Temporal range: Middle Triassic-Late Jurassic

Extinct genus of fishes

Ophiopsiella is an extinct genus of prehistoric ray-finned fish.

== Taxonomy ==
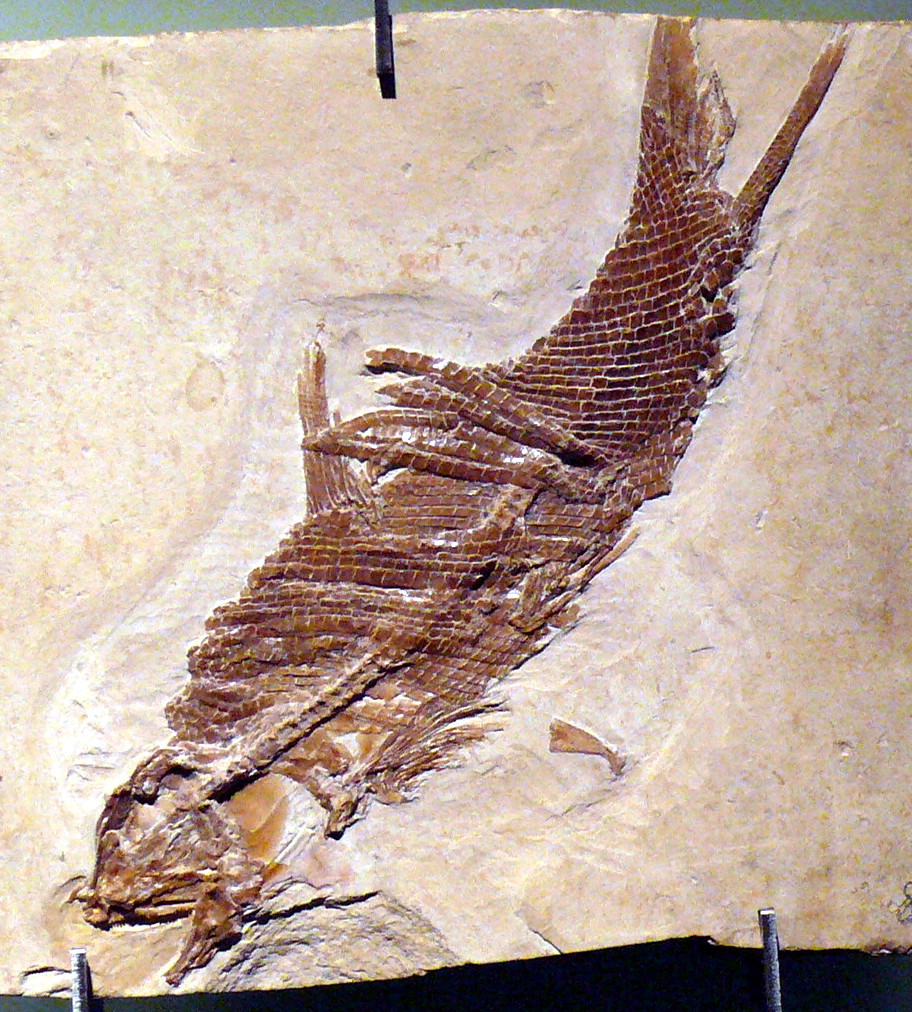

The type species, Ophiopsiella procera, described by Agassiz (1844), was previously considered by some authors to be the type species for the genus Ophiopsis. However, Lane and Ebert (2015) noted that Ophiopsis originally included O. muensteri only when first erected by Agassiz (1834), so they erected the new genus Ophiopsiella for Ophiopsis procera, referring "Ophiopsis" attenuata Wagner (1863), "Ophiopsis" penicillata Agassiz (1843), "Ophiopsis" breviceps Egerton (1852), "Ophiopsis" dorsalis Agassiz (1843), "Ophiopsis" montsechensis Wenz (1968) and "Ophiopsis" lepturus Bellotti (1857) to the genus.

== See also ==
- Prehistoric fish
- List of prehistoric bony fish
