= Oxygnathus =

Scientific classification
- Kingdom: Animalia
- Phylum: Arthropoda
- Class: Insecta
- Order: Coleoptera
- Suborder: Adephaga
- Family: Carabidae
- Subfamily: Scaritinae
- Genus: Oxygnathus; Dejean, 1826

Genus of beetles

Oxygnathus is a genus of beetles in the family Carabidae, containing the following species:

- Oxygnathus aboranus Andrewes, 1929
- Oxygnathus elongatus (Wiedemann, 1823)
- Oxygnathus ferrugineus Bulirsch, 2016
- Oxygnathus myanmarensis (Bulirsch, 2016)
