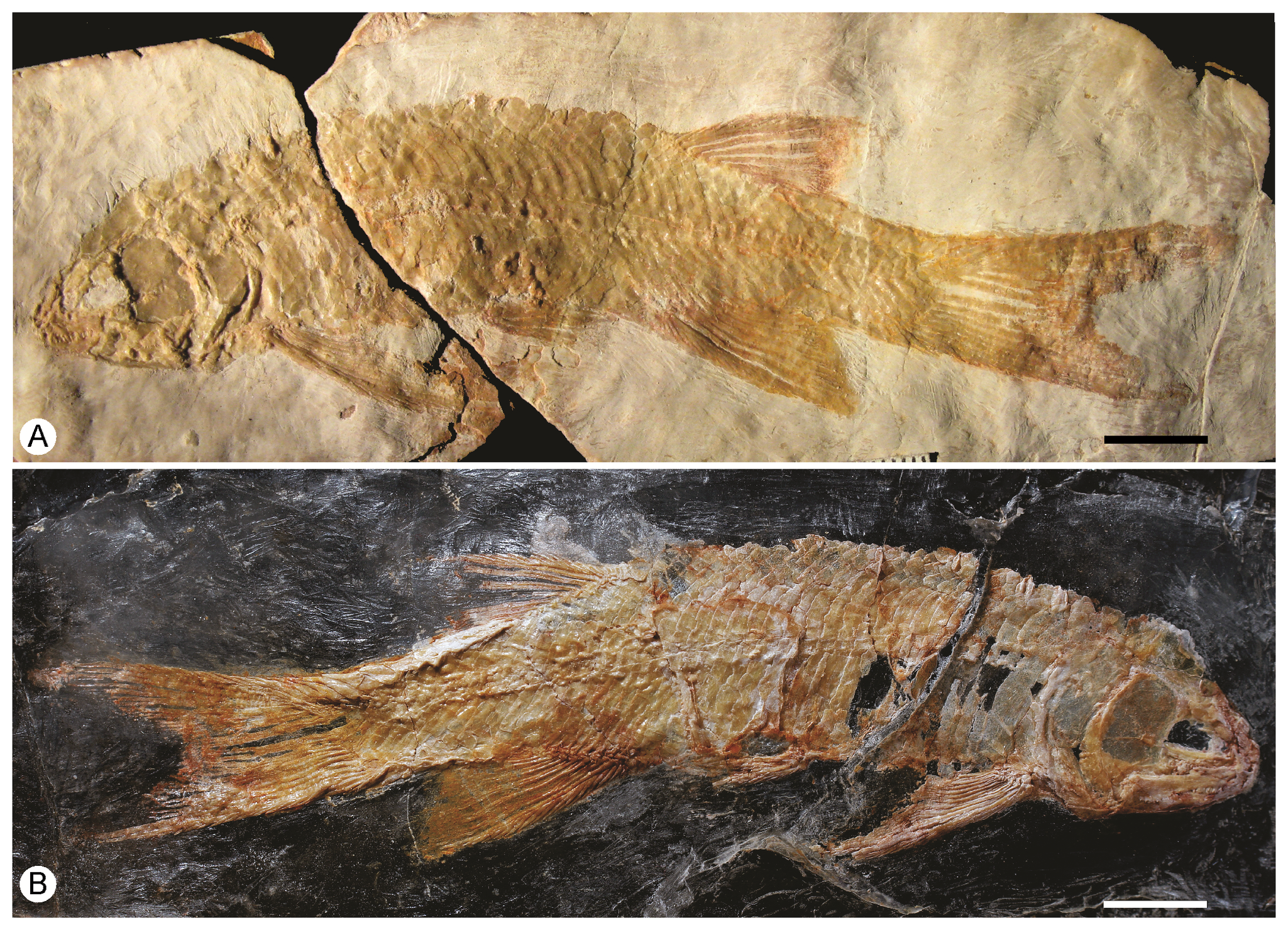
- Cretaceous †Cipactlichthys scutatus
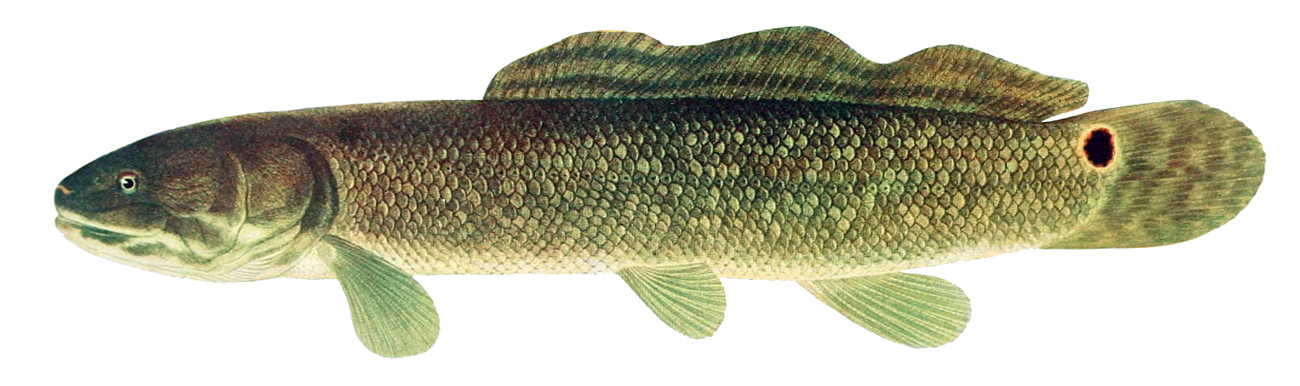
- Amia calva (bowfin)

Scientific classification
- Kingdom: Animalia
- Phylum: Chordata
- Class: Actinopterygii
- Subclass: Neopterygii
- Infraclass: Holostei
- Clade: Halecomorphi; Cope, 1872

Orders and families
- Amiiformes; Amiidae; †Caturidae; †Liodesmidae; †Sinamiidae; †Ionoscopiformes; †Ionoscopidae; †Italophiopsis; †Subortichthyidae; †Ophiopsiformes; †Furidae; †Ophiopsiellidae; †Parasemionotiformes; †Parasemionidae; †Promecosominidae

= Halecomorphi =

Halecomorphi Temporal range: 251–0 Ma

Clade of fishes

Halecomorphi is a taxon of ray-finned bony fish in the clade Neopterygii. The only extant Halecomorph species are the bowfin (Amia calva) and eyespot bowfin (Amia ocellicauda), but the group contains many extinct species in several families (including Amiidae, Caturidae, Liodesmidae, Sinamiidae) in the order Amiiformes, as well as the extinct orders Ionoscopiformes, Ophiopsiformes, Panxianichthyiformes, and Parasemionotiformes. The fossil record of halecomorphs goes back at least to the Early Triassic epoch.

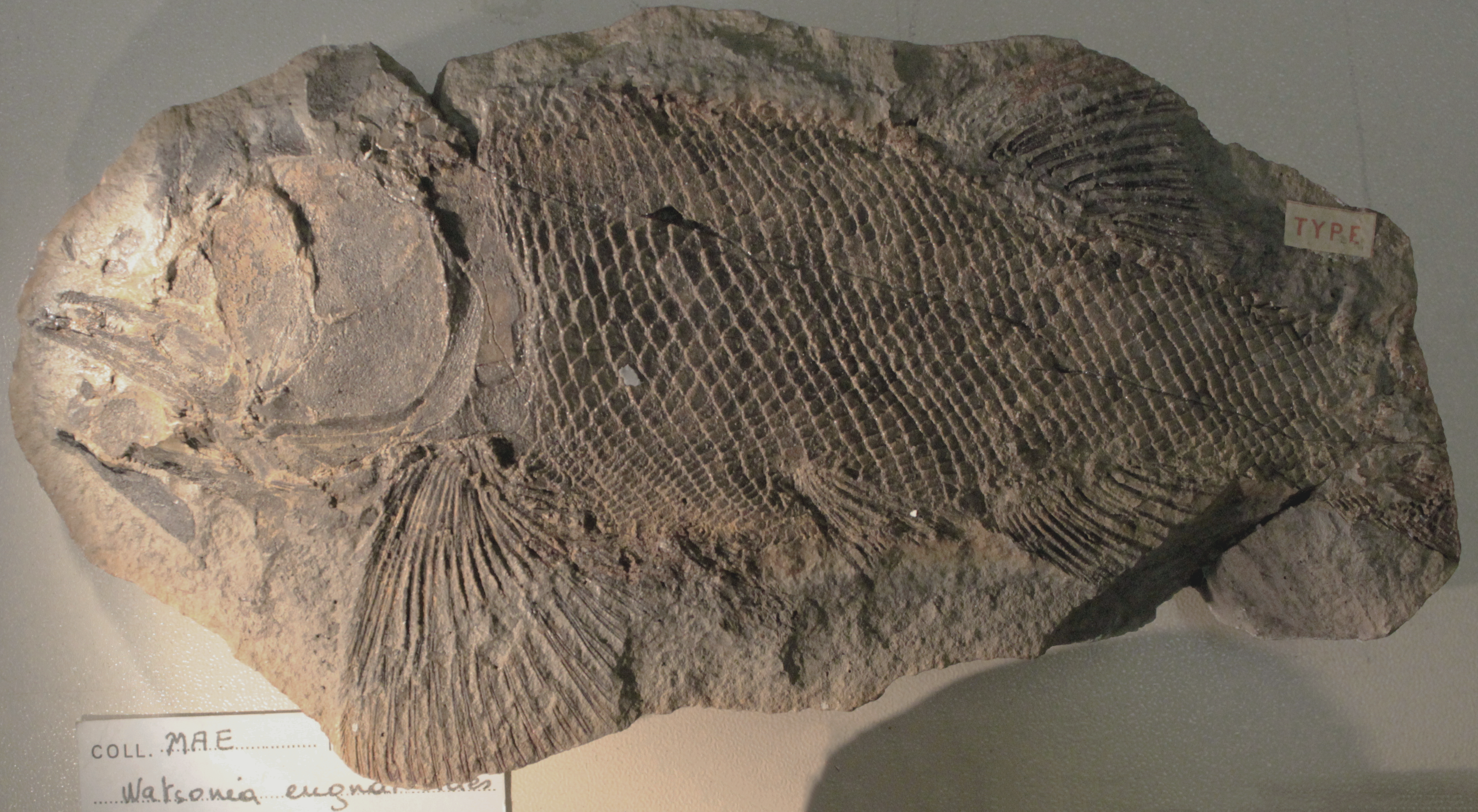
The parasemionotiform †Watsonulus

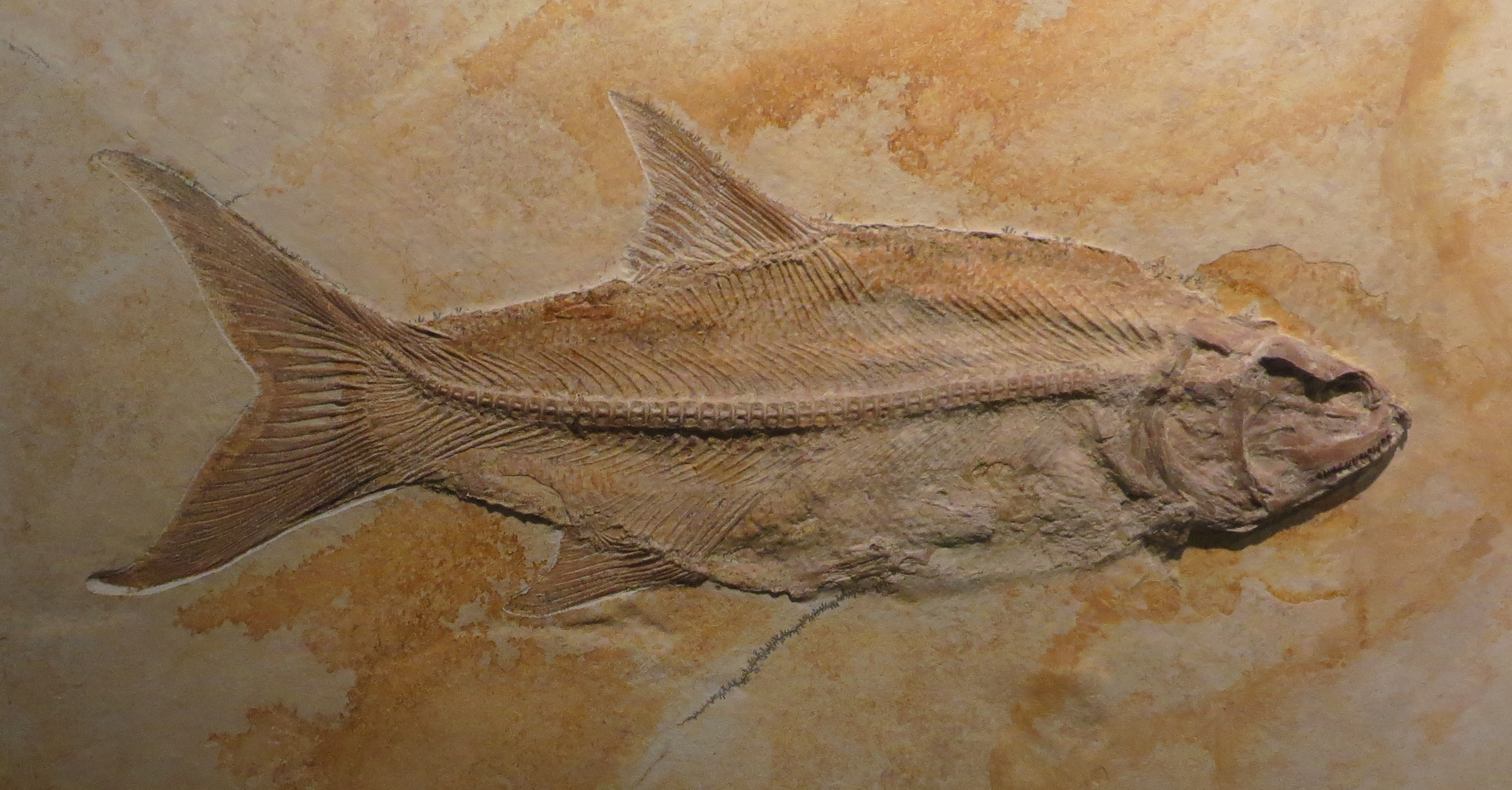
The ionoscopiform †Ionoscopus

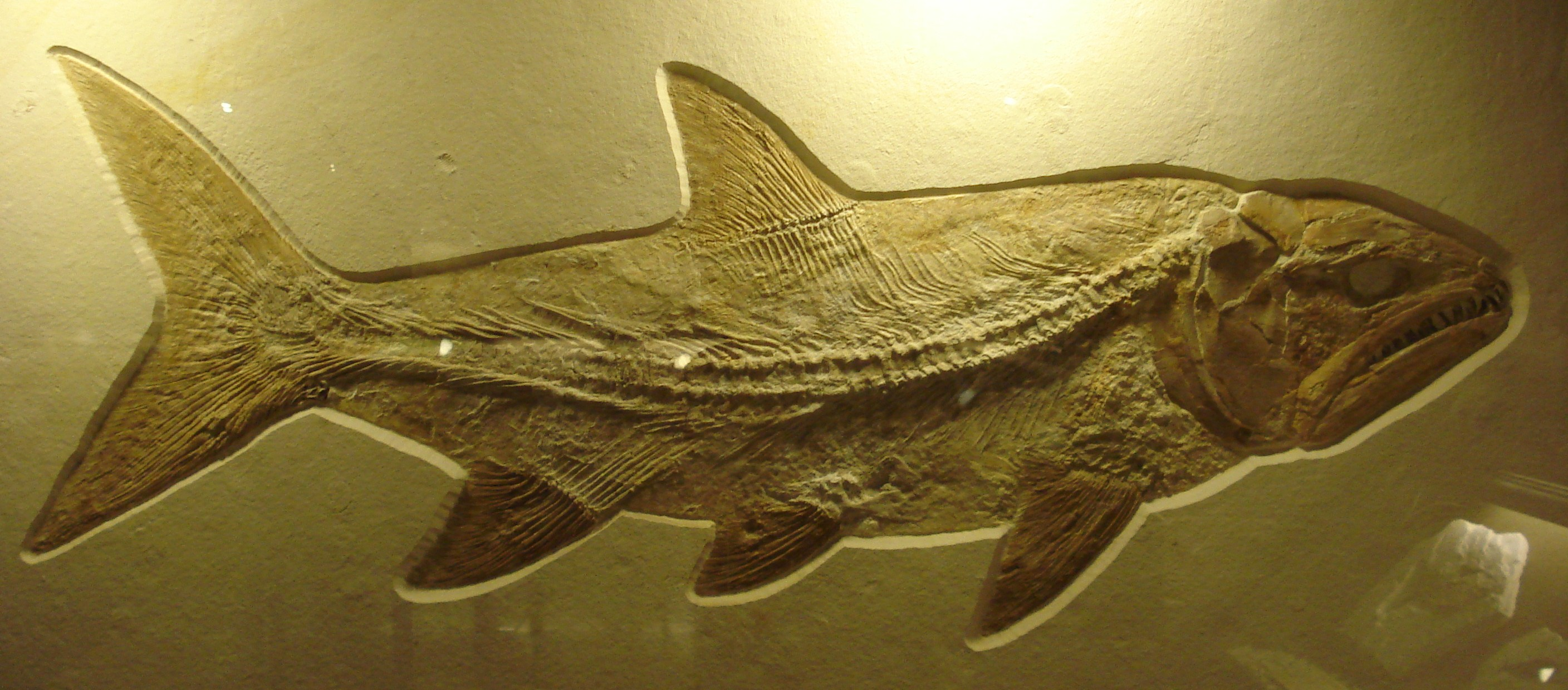
The amiiform †Caturus

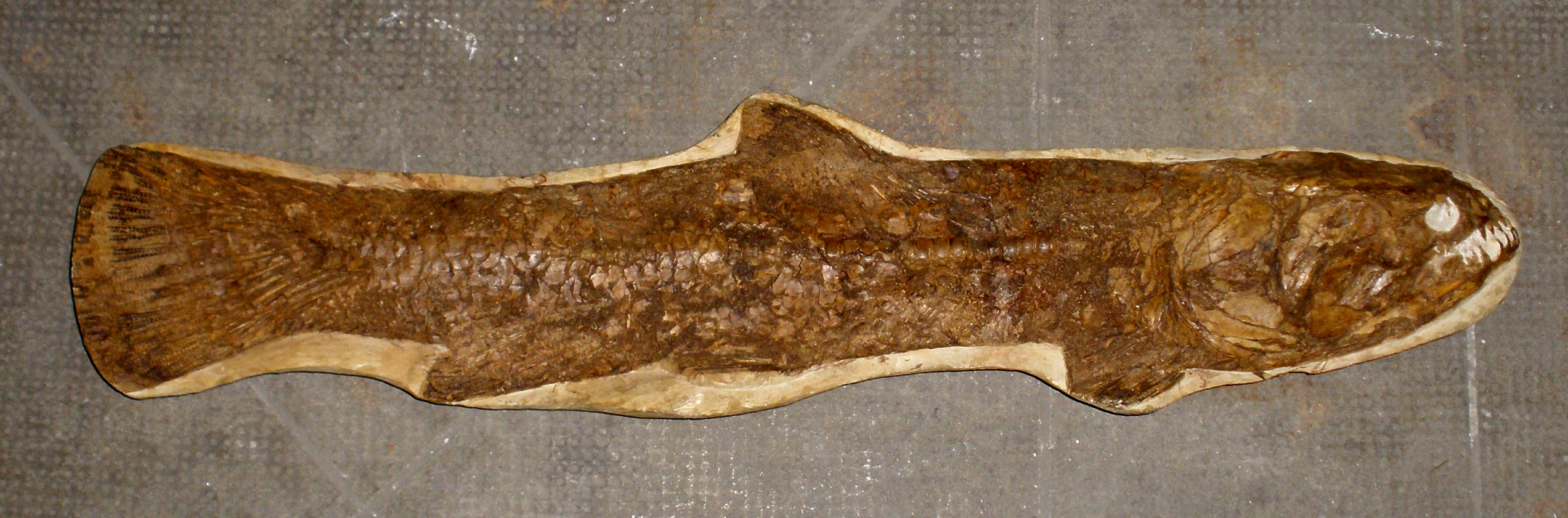
The amiiform †Calamopleurus

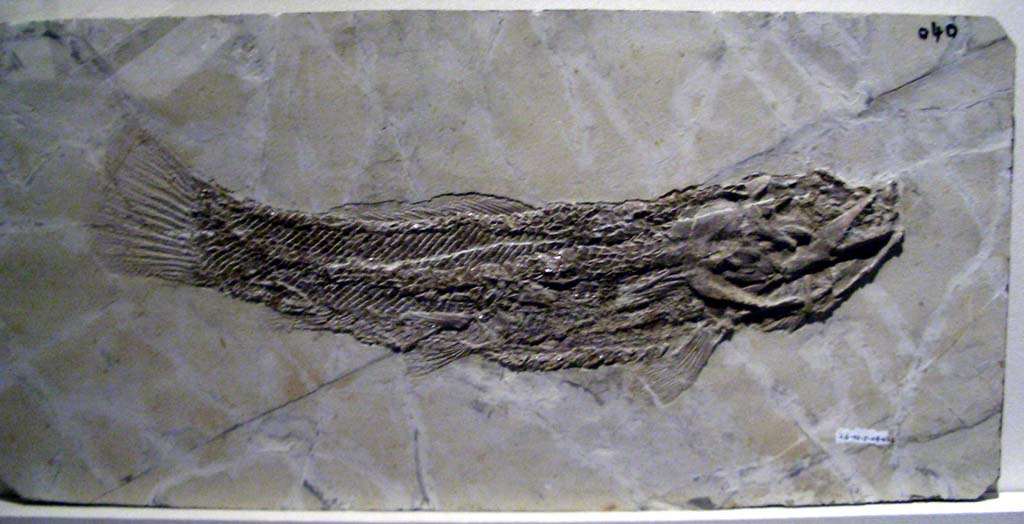
The amiiform †Sinamia

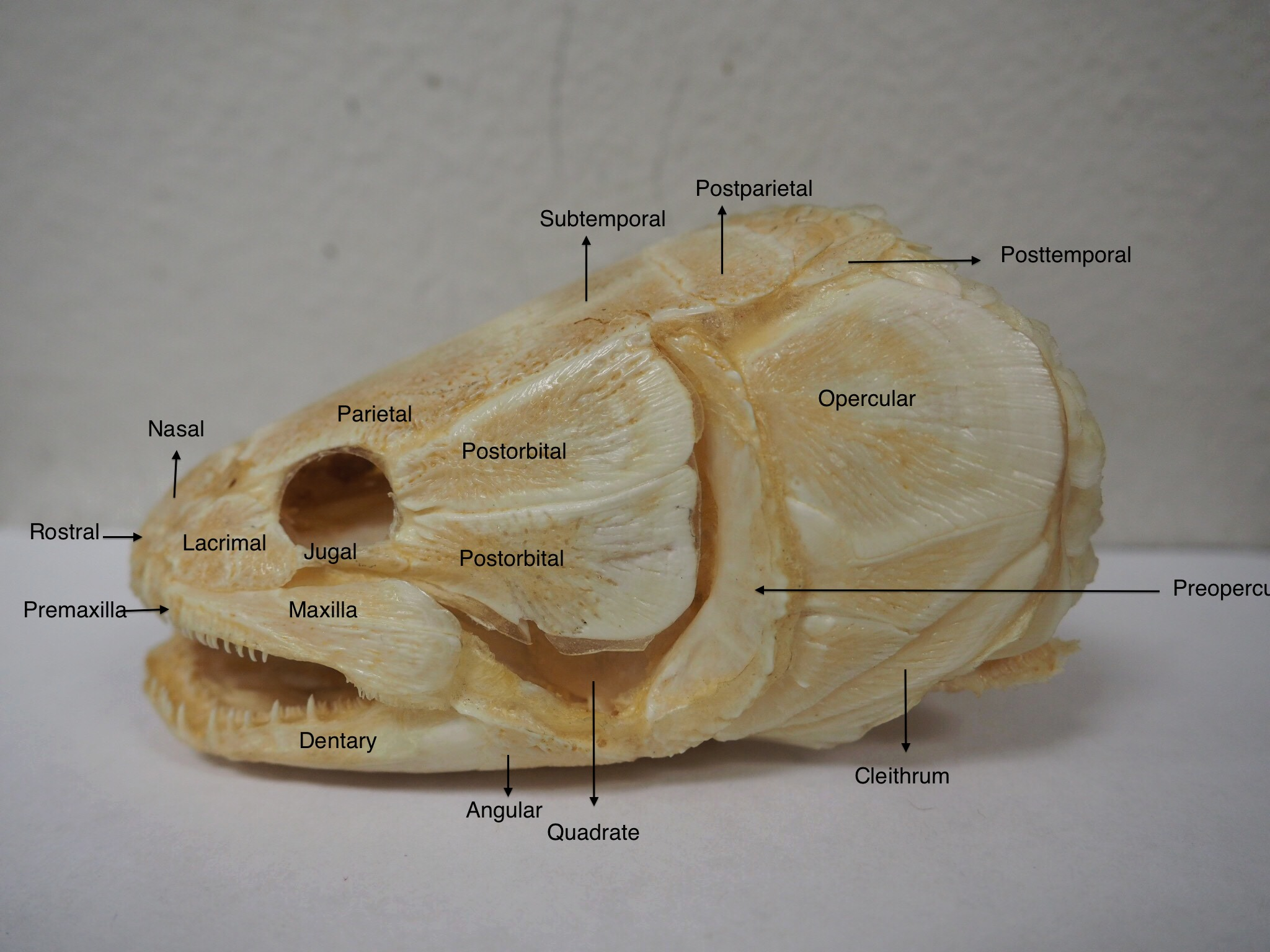
Skull of Amia calva (bowfin)

The Halecomorphi exhibit a combination of ancestral features, such as most heavily mineralized scales, but also by more derived or "modern" features, particularly in the structure of the skull (e.g. position and shape of preopercles). Unique derived traits (synapomorphies) of the Halecomorphi include:

- Unique jaw articulation in which the quadrate and symplectic participate in the joint.
- Lengthened dorsal fins (in some species)
- Two biconcave vertebrae per segment in the posterior body region (a condition known as diplospondyly)
- Fan like arrangement of small bones (hypurals) in the tail.

== Systematics and phylogeny ==
On the systematic position of the Halecomorphi, there are two competing hypotheses:

- The Halecostomi hypothesis proposes Halecomorphi as the sister group of Teleostei, the major group of living neopterygians, rendering the Holostei paraphyletic.
- The Holostei hypothesis proposes Halecomorphi as the sister group of Ginglymodi, the group which includes gars (Lepisosteidae) and their fossil relatives, rendering the Halecostomi paraphyletic.

The latter hypothesis is more widely accepted.

- Neopterygii
  - Teleostei
  - Holostei
    - Ginglymodi (gars and their fossil relatives)
    - Halecomorphi (bowfin and its fossil relatives)

The following cladogram summarizes the evolutionary relationships of extinct (indicated with a dagger, †) and living orders of Halecomorphi.

- Halecomorphi
  - †Parasemionotiformes
  - - †Panxianichthyiformes
    - - †Ionoscopiformes
      - Amiiformes (bowfin and its fossil relatives)
