= Sainte-Barbe Clays Formation =

Geological formation in Belgium

- Stratigraphic range: Barremian-early Aptian; ~126–124 Ma
- Type: Geological formation
- Underlies: Albian aged "Meules"
- Overlies: Breccia, Pennsylvanian basement
- Thickness: Variable, 50 m (160 ft) at Bernissart

Lithology
- Primary: Clay
- Other: Lignite

Location
- Coordinates: 50.5°N 3.6°E
- Approximate paleocoordinates: 40.7°N 13.7°E
- Country: Belgium
- Extent: Localised within the northern margins of the Mons Basin
- Sainte-Barbe Clays Formation (Belgium)

The Sainte-Barbe Clays Formation is a geological formation in Belgium. It is found in localised areas of the northern margin of the Mons Basin, alongside the equivalently aged Hautrage and Baudour Clay Formations. It is Upper Barremian-Lower Aptian in age. It predominantly consists of laminated clay, with some lignite. It is well known for the "Iguanodon sinkhole" locality near Bernissart where many specimens of Iguanodon bernissartensis were described by Louis Dollo in the late 19th century.

== Geologic context ==
The Sainte-Barbe Clays Formation are part of the stratigraphy of the Mons Basin, a Cretaceous-Cenozoic sedimentary basin in western Belgium. The subsidence of the basin floor is caused by the dissolution of anhydrite in the Carboniferous basement. Wealden facies are the oldest units within the basin, and are only found on the northern margin of the basin, being absent from the central and southern parts of the basin. Localised areas of significant subsidence, referred to as "sinkholes" are observed. The Wealden facies are overlain by "mixed siliciclastic–carbonate formations" called Meules dating to the Albian.

== Fossil content ==
=== Tetrapods ===
Tetrapods of the Sainte-Barbe Clays Formation
Genus	Species	Location	Stratigraphic position	Abundance	Notes	Images
Anteophthalmosuchus	A. epikrator	Bernissart		"Two ... fully articulated skeletons, one missing the skull and mandible."	Goniopholidid crocodyliform	
Bernissartia	B. fagesii	Bernissart		IRSNB R46, mostly complete skeleton	Bernissartiid crocodyliform	
Chitracephalus	C. dumonii	Bernissart		Carapace with preserved limbs	Cryptodiran turtle	
Iguanodon	I. bernissartensis	Bernissart		Multiple skeletons	Iguanodontian dinosaur	
Mantellisaurus	M. atherfieldensis	Bernissart		IRSNB 1551, single mostly complete skeleton	Iguanodontian dinosaur, formerly considered holotype of "Dollodon bampingi"	
Hylaeobatrachus	H. croyii	Bernissart		Slab and counterslab of a complete skeleton	Salamander	
Peltochelys	P. duchastelii	Bernissart		Shell fragments	Paracryptodire, probable close relative of Compsemys	
Theropoda	Indeterminate	Bernissart		Phalanx		

=== Fish ===
Fish of the Sainte-Barbe Clays Formation
Genus	Species	Location	Stratigraphic position	Abundance	Notes	Images
Aethalionopsis	A. robustus	Bernissart			Formerly referred to Anaethalion	
Amiopsis	A. dolloi	Bernissart				
Barbalepis	B. macroptera	Bernissart			Coccolepid fish, formerly referred to Coccolepis	
Pleuropholis	P. germinalis	Bernissart			Pleuropholid fish	
Callopterus	C. insignis	Bernissart			Genus is later considered as nomen nudum and Ainia is used for Jurassic species, but validity of this species is not discussed	
Pattersonella	P. formosa	Bernissart			Formerly referred to Leptolepis	
Scheenstia	S. bernissartensis	Bernissart		Multiple specimens	Previously referred to Lepidotes, L. brevifulcratus is a junior synonym.	
Turbomesodon	T. bernissartensis	Bernissart		Multiple specimens	Previously referred to Mesodon and Macromesodon.	

Other fish

- Leptolepis attenuatus
- L. brevis
- Notagogus parvus
- Nybelinoides brevis
- Ophiopsiella dorsalis
- Ophiopsis penicillatus
- Arratiaelops vectensis
- Pholidophorus obesus
- Scheenstia mantelli
- Belonostomus sp.
- Caturus sp.
- Pholidophorus sp.
- Polypsephis sp.
- Typodus sp.

=== Insects ===
The Tettigarctid cicada Hylaeoneura lignei is known from the formation.

=== Parasites ===
- Ascarites gerus
- A. priscus
- Digenites proterus
- Entamoebites antiquus

=== Flora ===
- Alethopteris elegans
- Cladophlebis dunkeri
- Conites minuta
- Laccopteris dunkeri
- Leckenbya valdensis
- Matonidium goepperti
- Onychiopsis mantelli
- Pecopteris conybeari
- P. polymorpha
- Pinites solmsi
- Polypodites mantelli
- Ruffordia goepperti
- Sagenopteris mantelli
- Sphenopteris delicatissima
- S. fittoni
- S. roemeri
- Stellatopollis hughesii
- Weichselia mantelli
- Adiantites sp.
- Equisetites sp.
- Gleichenia sp.
- Gleichenites sp.
- Hausmannia (Protorhipis)
- Lycopodites sp.
- cf. Taeniopteris sp.

=== Ichnofossils ===
- Algites sp.

== See also ==
- List of dinosaur bearing rock formations
- List of fossiliferous stratigraphic units in Belgium
