= La Huérguina Formation =

Geological formation in Spain

- Stratigraphic range: Barremian; ~125 Ma
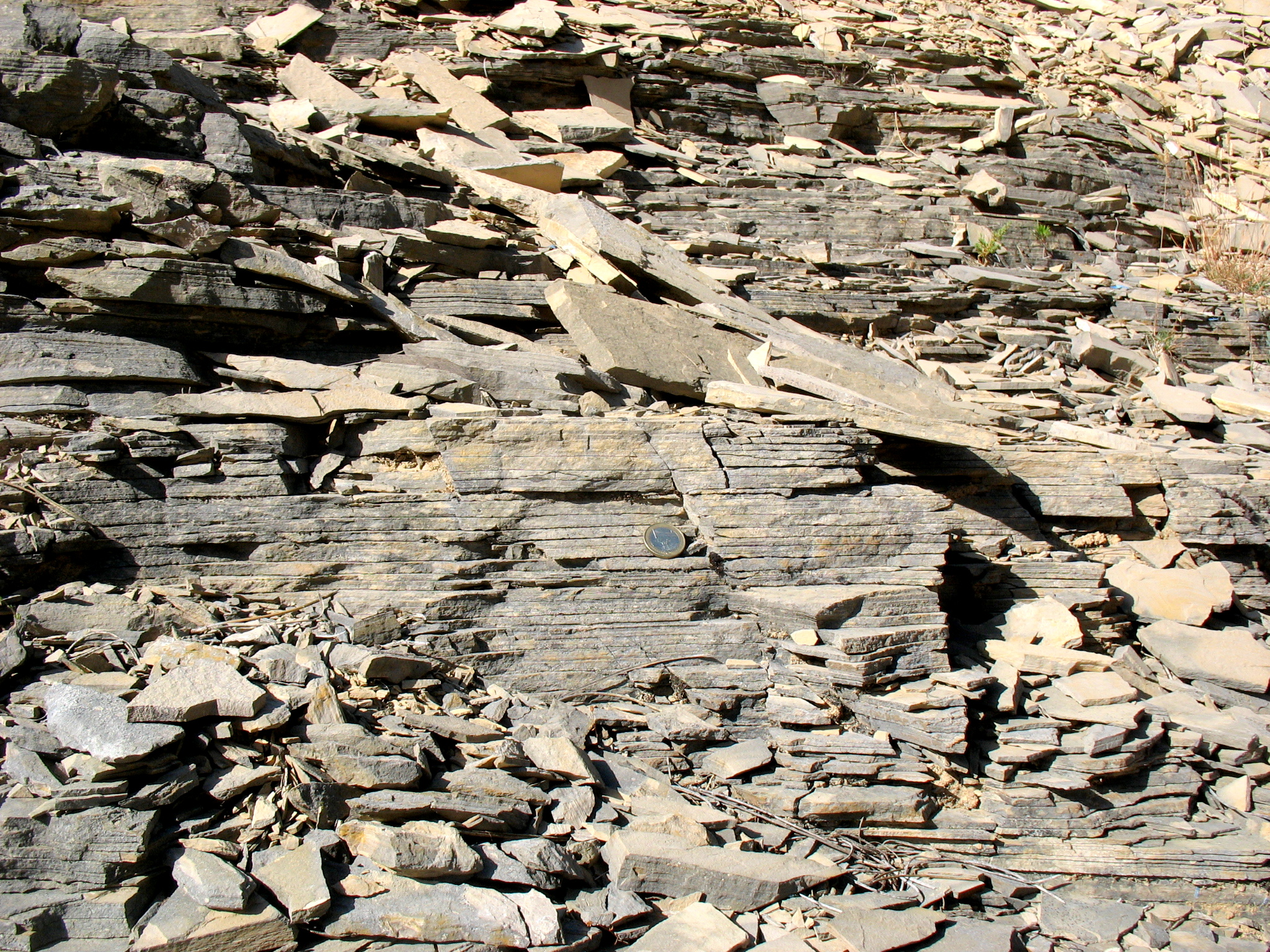
- Lithographic limestones of the Las Hoyas locality
- Type: Geological formation
- Underlies: Contreras Formation or Unconformity with the Utrillas Group
- Overlies: Tragacete Formation
- Thickness: 60–100 m (200–330 ft)

Lithology
- Primary: Limestone, marl
- Other: Conglomerate

Location
- Coordinates: 40.0897°N 1.8978°W
- Region: Cuenca, Castile-La Mancha
- Country: Spain
- Extent: South Iberian Basin

Type section
- Named for: Huérguina
- La Huérguina Formation (Spain) La Huérguina Formation (Castilla-La Mancha)

The La Huérguina Formation (also known as the Calizas de La Huérguina Formation, La Huérguina Limestone Formation or as the Una Formation) is a geological formation in Spain whose strata date back to the Barremian stage of the Early Cretaceous. Las Hoyas is a Konservat-Lagerstätte within the formation, located near the city of Cuenca, Spain. The site is mostly known for its exquisitely preserved dinosaurs, especially enantiornithines. The lithology of the formation mostly consists of lacustrine limestone deposited in a freshwater wetland environment.

== Las Hoyas ==
=== Taphonomy ===
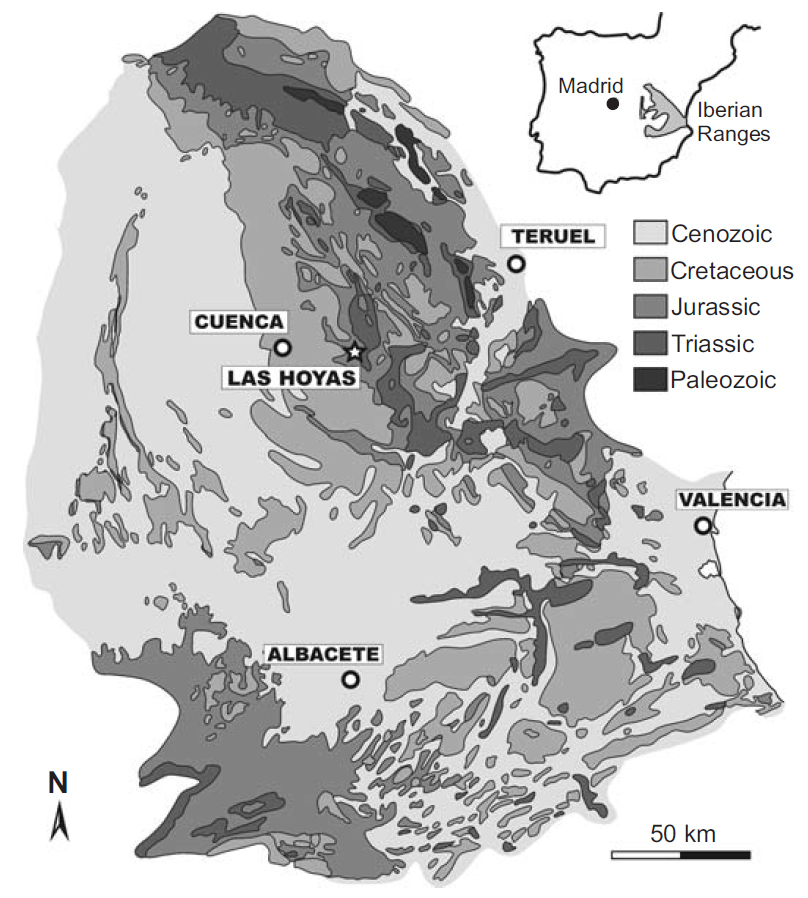
Map showing the Las Hoyas site (star), and Mesozoic strata of the Iberian Ranges

As a Konservat-Lagerstätte, the preservation is exceptional. This may be a result of three factors: Microbial mats, Obruption and Stagnation.

Microbial mats may be responsible for the preservation of soft tissue in many fossils from Las Hoyas, like Pelecanimimus' crest. The iron carbonate depositions, a result from bacterial metabolism which covered the dinosaur's crest enhanced the preservation of those soft tissues. Evidence of these mats comes from the studies on microfacies and the fossils themselves.

Obruption is notable in the formation, due to the presence of highly articulated specimens. From actuotaphonomy studies on several different organisms it can be estimated that the burial of most entities was quick. Concornis may have been buried in less than 15 days, after a period of sub-areal exposition.

=== Paleoenvironment ===
Las Hoyas was an inland lacustrine environment which presents an important aquatic and terrestrial flora (with many specimens of Charophytes, Montsechia, Weichselia or Frenelopsis) and diverse fauna, with specimens of at least five or six phyla: arthropods, molluscs, chordates and many vermiform soft bodied animals which might be Nemertines or annelids.

Among vertebrates the most abundant and diverse group are fish. The presence of mostly articulated skeletons, exceptional preservation of tissue and lack of any other signs of transportation may indicate that these are demic and autochthonous entities (meaning that they lived and died in the same place where they fossilized).

Crocodylomorphs are the most abundant amniotes from Las Hoyas.

Dinosaurs from Las Hoyas (avian and non avian) are unique in many ways. The first ornithomimosaur dinosaur described in Europe, Pelecanimimus polyodon, shows some characters previously unknown in these dinosaurs which enhanced the knowledge on the evolution of the group, such as a high number of teeth. Concavenator corcovatus presents two unique features: very tall neural spines on the vertebrae near the hip, which look like a hump, and a structure on its forearm, which if homologous to quill knobs would push back the origin of feathers earlier in theropod evolution.

Las Hoyas birds are enantiornithes, the most diverse Cretaceous bird clade, which became extinct at the end of the period. Iberomesornis romerali shows both derived ("avian") and primitive ("dinosaurian") characters. Within the derived characters we can underline the presence of a pygostile, although it is still very large compared to that of modern neornithines and the presence of a quilled sternum. Eoalulavis hoyasi shows the first report of an alula or "bastard wing", which means it had a flight manoeuvrability analogous to that of modern birds. The date of the Las Hoyas age is constrained to Late Barremian by charophyte and ostracod assemblages.

=== Research ===
The Las Hoyas site has been studied for more than two decades by researchers from the Universidad Autónoma de Madrid, the Universidad Complutense de Madrid and the National University of Distance Education, in collaboration with the Museo de las Ciencias de Castilla-La Mancha, which is responsible for the fossil record from the area.

== Fossil content ==
Color key: Taxon / Reclassified taxon / Taxon falsely reported as present / Dubious taxon or junior synonym / Ichnotaxon / Ootaxon / Morphotaxon

Notes
Uncertain or tentative taxa are in small text
~~crossed out~~ taxa are discredited.

=== Crustaceans ===
Crustaceans
Genus	Species	Location	Stratigraphic position	Material	Notes	Images
Austropotamobius	A. llopisi	Las Hoyas		Numerous specimens	A crayfish	
Delclosia	D. martinelli	Las Hoyas		Numerous specimens	An atyid shrimp	
Lahuerguinagrapta	L. multicostata	Las Hoyas			A clam shrimp belonging to the family Afrograptidae	
Skyestheria	Indeterminate	Las Hoyas			A clam shrimp belonging to the family Polygraptidae	
Pseudestherites	Indeterminate	Las Hoyas			A clam shrimp belonging to the family Antronestheriidae	
Spinogriphus	S. ibericus	Las Hoyas			A member of Peracarida belonging to Spelaeogriphacea	

=== Chondrichthyes ===
Chondrichthyes
Genus	Species	Location	Stratigraphic position	Material	Notes	Images
Lonchidion	Indeterminate	Las Hoyas		A full body impression of a juvenile	Hybodont	

=== Osteichthyes ===
Osteichthyes
Genus	Species	Location	Stratigraphic position	Material	Notes	Images
Caturus	Caturus sp.	Las Hoyas			Amiiformes	
Gordichthys	G. conquensis	Las Hoyas			Gonorynchiform	
Hispanamia	H. newbreyi	Las Hoyas			Amiid, originally described as Amiopsis	
cf. "Holophagus"	Indeterminate	Las Hoyas			Coelacanth, probably does not belong in Holophagus proper.	
Hoyasotes	H. tanyrhis	Las Hoyas			Member of Lepidotidae, originally described as Lepidotes	
Lepidohyas	L. microrhis	Las Hoyas			Member of Lepidotidae, originally described as Lepidotes	
Notagogus	N. aff. N. ferreri	Las Hoyas			Macrosemiid	
Pleuropholis	P. sp.	Las Hoyas				
Propterus	P. sp.	Las Hoyas			Macrosemiid	
Rubiesichthys	R. gregalis	Las Hoyas			Gonorynchiform	
Stenamara	S. mia	Las Hoyas			Pycnodont	
Turbomesodon	T. praeclarus	Las Hoyas			Pycnodont	
Vidalamia	V. cf. catalunica	Las Hoyas			Amiid	

=== Amphibians ===
Amphibians
Genus	Species	Location	Stratigraphic position	Material	Notes	Images
Albanerpeton	Indeterminate	Uña		Frontals	Albanerpetontid	
Celtedens	C. ibericus	Las Hoyas			Albanerpetontid	
Celtedens	C. megacephalus	Uña			Albanerpetontid	
Gracilibatrachus	G. avallei	Las Hoyas			Pipimorph frog	
Hylaeobatrachus	Indeterminate	Las Hoyas			Salamander	
Iberobatrachus	I. angelae	Las Hoyas			Frog	
Valdotriton	V. gracilis	Las Hoyas			Salamander	
Wealdenbatrachus	W. jucarensis	Uña			Frog	

=== Turtles ===
Turtles
Genus	Species	Location	Stratigraphic position	Material	Notes	Images
Hoyasemys	H. jimenezi	Las Hoyas			A eucryptodire	
Pleurosternidae	Indeterminate	Uña				
Pelomedusidae	Indeterminate	Uña				

=== Squamates ===
Squamates
Genus	Species	Location	Stratigraphic position	Material	Notes	Images
Becklesius	Indeterminate, B. cataphractus	Uña			Paramacellodid lizard	
Cuencasaurus	C. estesi	Uña				
Hoyalacerta	H. sanzi	Las Hoyas				
Jucaraseps	J. grandipes	Las Hoyas			Scleroglossa	
Meyasaurus	M. diazromerali	Las Hoyas			Teiioid lizard	
Meyasaurus	M. unaensis	Uña			Teiioid lizard	
Paramacellodus	P. sinuosus	Uña			Paramacellodid lizard	
Scandensia	S. ciervensis	Las Hoyas				

=== Mammals ===
Mammals
Genus	Species	Location	Stratigraphic position	Material	Notes	Images
Crusafontia	C. cuencana	Uña			Dryolestid	
Eobaatar	E. hispanicus	Uña			Eobaatarid multituberculate	
Galveodon	G. nannothus	Uña			Paulchoffatiid multituberculate	
Spinolestes	S. xenarthrosus	Las Hoyas		Exceptionally complete specimen, preserving soft tissues such as pelage, ears and internal organs.	Gobiconodont eutriconodont	

=== Crocodyliformes ===
Crocodyliformes
Genus	Species	Location	Stratigraphic position	Material	Notes	Images
Bernissartia	Indeterminate	Uña				
Cassissuchus	C. sanziuami	Las Hoyas			Gobiosuchid	
Montsecosuchus	Indeterminate	Las Hoyas				
Sabresuchus	S.ibericus	Uña				
Unasuchus	U. reginae	Uña				
Bernissartiidae	Indeterminate	Las Hoyas				

=== Ornithodirans ===
Ornithodirans
Genus	Species	Location	Stratigraphic position	Material	Notes	Images
Concavenator	C. corcovatus	Las Hoyas		"Nearly complete and articulated skeleton."	Carcharodontosaur dinosaur	
Concornis	C. lacustris	Las Hoyas		"Postcranial skeleton."	Enantiornithean bird	
Eoalulavis	E. hoyasi	Las Hoyas		"Thoracic region and forelimbs."	Enantiornithean bird	
Euronychodon	Indeterminate	Las Hoyas			Theropod dinosaur	
Europejara	E. olcadesorum	Las Hoyas			Tapejarid pterosaur	
Gorgonavis	G. alcyone	Las Hoyas		Partial skull	Enantiornithean bird	
Iberomesornis	I. romerali	Las Hoyas		Postcranial skeleton	Enantiornithean bird	
Mantellisaurus	M. atherfieldensis	Las Hoyas		"incomplete but fully-articulated right hindlimb"	Iguanodontian dinosaur	
Pelecanimimus	P. polyodon	Las Hoyas		"Skull and partial skeleton"	Ornithomimosaurian dinosaur	
Paronychodon	Indeterminate	Las Hoyas			Theropod dinosaur	
Richardoestesia	Indeterminate	Las Hoyas			Theropod dinosaur	

== Correlation ==
Early Cretaceous stratigraphy of Iberia
Ma	Age	Paleomap \ Basins	Cantabrian	Olanyà	Cameros	Maestrazgo	Oliete	Galve	Morella	South Iberian	Pre-betic	Lusitanian
100	Cenomanian		La Cabana	Sopeira	Utrillas		Mosquerela					Caranguejeira
100	Cenomanian		Altamira	Sopeira	Utrillas							Caranguejeira
100	Cenomanian		Eguino	Sopeira	Utrillas							Caranguejeira
125	Albian		Ullaga - Balmaseda	Lluçà	Utrillas					Traiguera		Caranguejeira
125	Albian		Monte Grande	Lluçà	Escucha		Escucha			Jijona		Caranguejeira
125	Albian		Itxina - Miono	Lluçà	Escucha		Escucha					Caranguejeira
125	Aptian		Valmaseda - Tellamendi	Lluçà	Ol Gp. - Castrillo	Benassal	Escucha	Benassal				Olhos
125	Aptian		Valmaseda - Tellamendi	Font	En Gp. - Leza	Morella/Oliete	Oliete	Villaroya	Morella	Capas; Rojas		Almargem
125	Aptian		Patrocinio - Ernaga	Senyús	En Gp. - Jubela	Forcall			Morella	Villaroya	Upper; Bedoulian	Figueira
125	Barremian		Vega de Pas	Cabó	Abejar	Xert	Alacón	Xert	Morella	Huérguina	Upper; Bedoulian	Assises
125	Barremian		Vega de Pas	Prada	Abejar	Artoles			Morella	Collado	Moutonianum	Papo Seco
125	Barremian		Vega de Pas	Rúbies	Tera Gp. - Golmayo	Alacón/Blesa	Blesa	Camarillas	Mirambel	Collado	Moutonianum	Papo Seco
150	Hauterivian		Vega de Pas	Rúbies	Ur Gp. - Pinilla	Llacova	Blesa	Castellar	Tera Gp. - Pinilla	Villares		Porto da Calada
150	Hauterivian		Vega de Pas	Rúbies	Ur Gp. - Pinilla	Llacova	hiatus	Castellar		Villares		Porto da Calada
150	Hauterivian		Vega de Pas	Rúbies	Ur Gp. - Pinilla	Huerva	hiatus	Castellar	Gaita			Porto da Calada
150	Valanginian		Villaro	Rúbies	Ur Gp. - Larriba	Huerva	hiatus	Castellar	Ped Gp. - Hortigüela			Porto da Calada
150	Valanginian		Villaro	Rúbies	Ped Gp. - Hortigüela	Huerva	hiatus	Castellar	Ped Gp. - Piedrahita			Porto da Calada
150	Valanginian		Villaro	Rúbies	Peñacoba	Huerva	hiatus	Galve	Ped Gp. - Piedrahita	Miravetes		Porto da Calada
150	Berriasian		Cab Gp. - Arcera	Rúbies	Valdeprado	hiatus	hiatus	Alfambra	Ped Gp. - Piedrahita	Miravetes		Porto da Calada
150	Berriasian		Cab Gp. - Arcera		TdL Gp. - Rupelo	hiatus	hiatus	Arzobispo	hiatus	Tollo		Porto da Calada
150	Berriasian		Cab Gp. - Arcera		On Gp. - Huérteles; Sierra Matute	hiatus	hiatus	Arzobispo	hiatus	Tollo		Porto da Calada
150	Tithonian		Lastres		Tera Gp. - Magaña	hiatus	Higuereles		hiatus	Tera Gp. - Magaña		Lourinhã
150	Tithonian		Lastres		Tera Gp. - Magaña	hiatus	Higuereles		Arzobispo	Tera Gp. - Magaña		Lourinhã
150	Tithonian		Lastres		Ágreda	hiatus	Higuereles		Arzobispo	Tera Gp. - Magaña		Lourinhã
Legend		Major fossiliferous, oofossiliferous, ichnofossiliferous, coproliferous, minor formation										

== See also ==
- List of dinosaur-bearing rock formations
- Paja Formation, contemporaneous Lagerstätte of Colombia
- Yixian Formation, contemporaneous Lagerstätte of China
