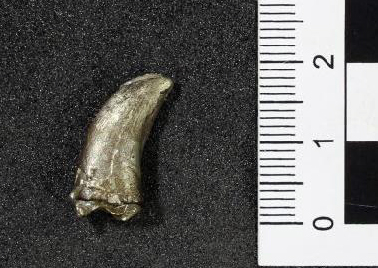
- Cast of the holotype tooth, in the Natural History Museum, London

Scientific classification
- Kingdom: Animalia
- Phylum: Chordata
- Class: Reptilia
- Clade: Dinosauria
- Clade: Saurischia
- Clade: Theropoda
- Family: †Dromaeosauridae
- Clade: †Eudromaeosauria
- Subfamily: †Dromaeosaurinae
- Genus: †Dromaeosauroides; Christiansen & Bonde, 2003

Type species
- †Dromaeosauroides bornholmensis Christiansen & Bonde, 2003

= Dromaeosauroides =

Dromaeosauroides Temporal range: Early Cretaceous, 140 Ma

Genus of dromaeosaurid theropod dinosaur from the Early Cretaceous

Dromaeosauroides is a genus of dromaeosaurid dinosaur from the Early Cretaceous of what is now Denmark and possibly also England. It was discovered in the Jydegaard Formation in the Robbedale valley, on the island of Bornholm in the Baltic Sea. This formation ranges from the Berriasian to the Valanginian ages. This is the only likely place for dinosaur remains to be discovered on Danish territory, since the Mesozoic deposits exposed in the rest of the country are marine. Dromaeosauroides is the first known dinosaur from Denmark, and the only one which has been scientifically named. It is one of the oldest known dromaeosaurs in the world, and the first known uncontested dromaeosaur from the Early Cretaceous of Europe.

It is known from two teeth, the first of which was found in 2000 and the second in 2008. Based on the first tooth (the holotype), the genus and species Dromaeosauroides bornholmensis was named in 2003. The genus name means "Dromaeosaurus-like", due to the similarity to the teeth of that genus, and the species name means "from Bornholm". The first tooth was certified "Danekræ" ("Danish creature") when its scientific importance was evaluated. After this discovery, remains and tracks of more dinosaurs were found in various geological formations on Bornholm. Coprolites containing fish remains found in the Jydegaard Formation may belong to dromaeosaurs such as Dromaeosauroides. Some teeth from the United Kingdom that have been assigned to the genus Nuthetes may also belong to this animal.

The holotype tooth is 21.7 millimetres (0.85 in) long, and the second tooth is 15 millimetres (0.59 in). They are curved and finely serrated. In life, Dromaeosauroides would have been 2 to 3 metres (7 to 10 ft) in length, and weighed about 40 kilograms (88 lb). As a dromaeosaur it would have been feathered, and had a large sickle claw on its feet like its relatives. Various ideas for how dromaeosaurids used their sickle-claws have been proposed, and 21st-century studies suggest they used them to grasp and restrain struggling prey while dismembering them with the mouth. Dromaeosauroides lived in a coastal lagoon environment with sauropods, as evidenced by a possible titanosaur tooth.

== Discovery and naming ==
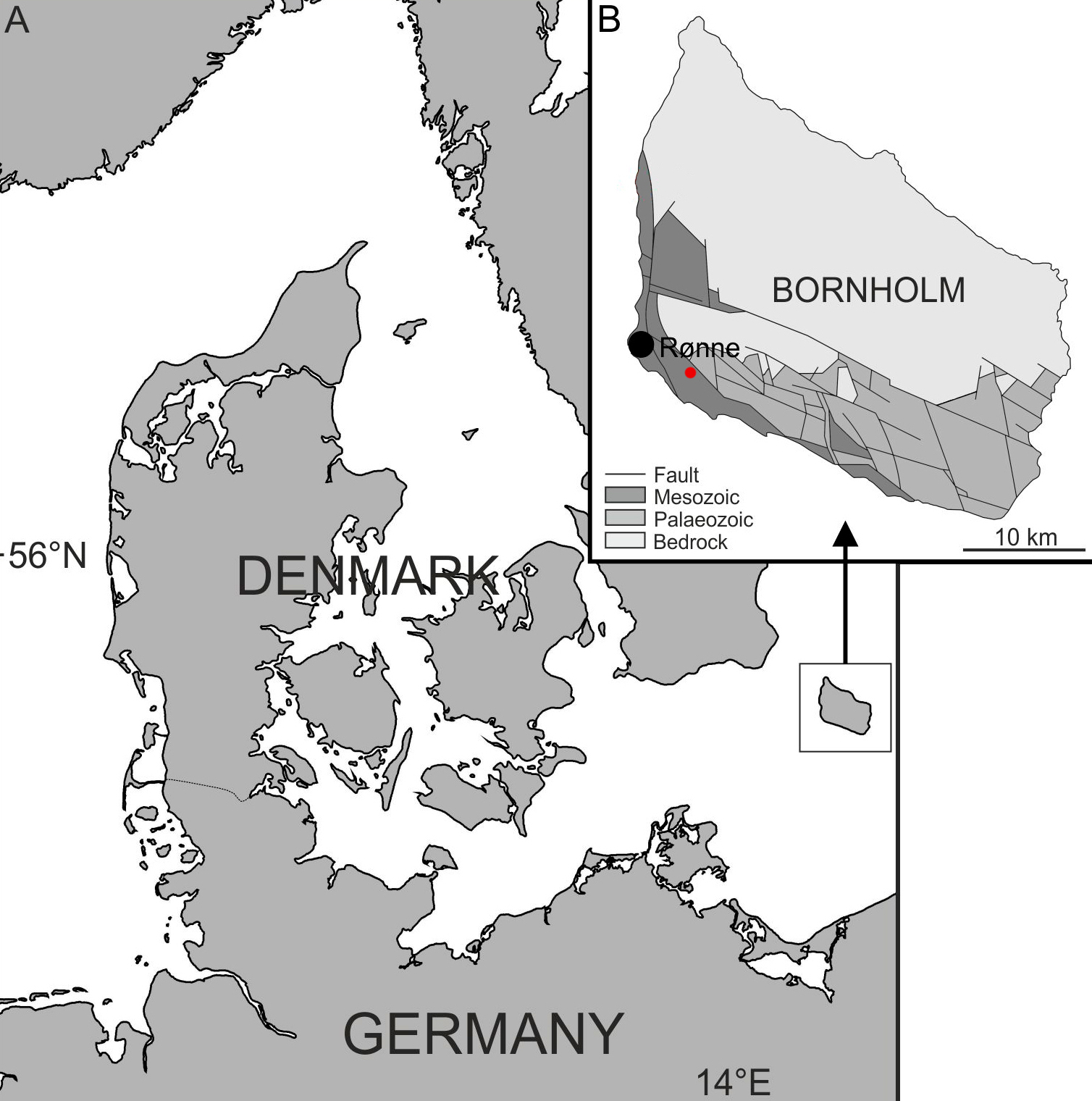
Map showing Denmark (A) and the island of Bornholm (B), with "Carl Nielsen's sandpit" where Dromaeosauroides was found indicated by a red dot

Few dinosaur remains have been found in Scandinavia. The mainland of western Denmark is an unlikely region to find dinosaur remains, since the Mesozoic sediments there are marine Maastrichtian chalk. Fossils of non-dinosaurian marine animals, including mosasaurs and plesiosaurs, have been found in these deposits. Mesozoic deposits in Scania, Sweden, are much richer in fossils, including those of dinosaurs. The Danish island of Bornholm in the Baltic Sea was part of the same land mass as Scania (the Scandinavian-Russian continent), and has a similar geology. The southwestern part of the island is the only place in Denmark which has yielded dinosaur remains.

During the 1990s, the Fossil Project (disbanded in 2005) was formed by a group of unemployed people who received funding from Denmark and the EEC to maintain geological sites on Bornholm. One of these, "Carl Nielsen's sandpit" in the Robbedale valley (not to be confused with the Robbedale Formation, where no vertebrate remains have been found), is part of the Jydegaard Formation. This formation is 140 million years old, dating to the Late Berriasian (or Ryazanian) stage of the Early Cretaceous period. The Fossil Project sifted sand at these sites in cooperation with the NaturBornholm interpretation centre, which exhibited the fossils discovered. In September 2000, Danish palaeontologists Per Christiansen and Niels Bonde taught a field course at the site, "The Hunt for Danish Dinosaurs". During the course, geology student Eliza Jarl Estrup found a theropod tooth, the first dinosaur discovered on Danish territory, and the find was recorded by a local television station.

The tooth was presented at the 45th annual meeting of the Palaeontological Association in 2001, and identified as a dromaeosaur. In 2003 the tooth (catalogued as MGUH 27218/DK 315 in the Geological Museum of Copenhagen) was made the holotype specimen of Dromaeosauroides bornholmensis—scientifically named and described by Christiansen and Bonde. The genus name combines the name of Dromaeosaurus with the Greek -ides ("in the form of"), referring to the resemblance between the teeth of the two genera. The specific name refers to Bornholm. The name Dromaeosaurus itself consists of the Greek words dromaios or "fast running", and sauros or "reptile".

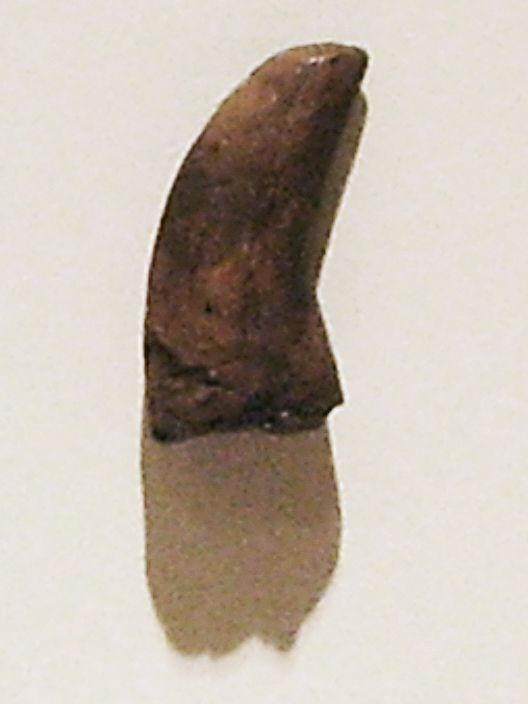
Cast of the holotype tooth in the Geological Museum of Copenhagen

Bonde and Christiansen had expected the first Danish dinosaur remains to be teeth of herbivorous dinosaurs such as hypsilophodonts or Iguanodon, and were surprised to find a dromaeosaur tooth instead, since these are rare in Early Cretaceous formations; herbivores would have been more abundant than carnivores. Because the dromaeosaur seems to have been large, they expected that resilient bones, such as claws, might be found in the future. The palaeontologists did not expect bones of larger dinosaurs to be discovered in the formation (since these would most likely have been found when the sand was commercially exploited), but hoped the remains of a Mesozoic mammal would be found. The holotype tooth has been illustrated in several books and research articles. It was certified "Danekræ" ("Danish creature", according to a 1990 Danish museum law securing important fossils) when its scientific importance was evaluated by the Geological Museum.

In late summer 2008, ranger Jens Kofoed found a second dromaeosaurid tooth. This specimen (DK 559) was found in the same location, and later assigned to Dromaeosauroides as well. Kofoed explained that the finds were surprising because people had been unsuccessfully searching for dinosaur remains in Denmark for years, and it was like finding a "needle in a haystack". In a press release, the second dromaeosaur tooth was also certified Danekræ by the Natural History Museum of Denmark, which compared the animal to the raptors in the film Jurassic Park, noting that the animals, unlike the film's raptors, would have been feathered.

Since the discovery of Dromaeosauroides, evidence of more dinosaurs has been found in various geological formations on Bornholm, such as additional teeth and footprints from various groups. In 2012, Jesper Milàn and colleagues described two coprolites (fossilised faeces) containing fish scales and bones. They were found in the Jydegaard Formation, the first such fossils found in Danish continental Mesozoic deposits. Although the producer of these faeces cannot be identified with certainty, marine turtles and dromaeosaurids such as Dromaeosauroides are the most likely candidates.

== Description ==
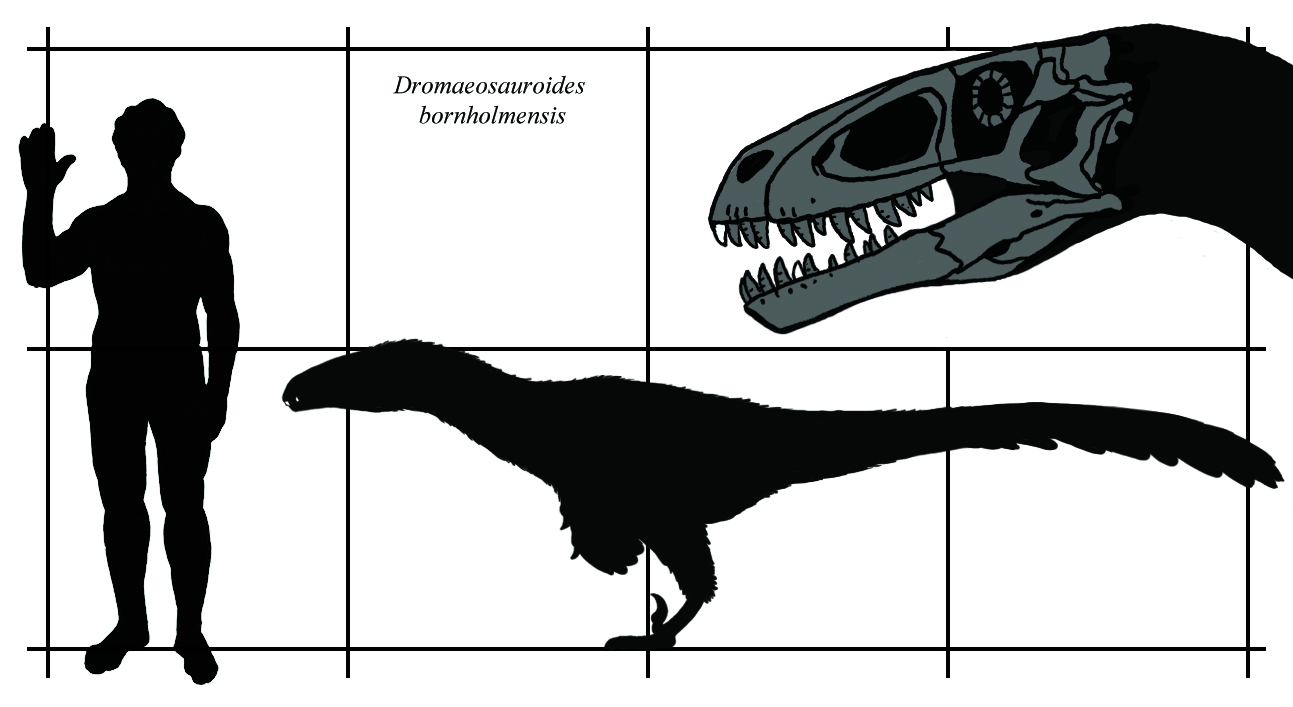
Estimated size of Dromaeosauroides, and possible placement of the two known teeth

Fossil theropod teeth are typically identified according to features including size, proportion, curvature of the crown and the morphology and number of denticles (serrations). The holotype of D. bornholmensis is a tooth crown 21.7 millimetres (0.85 in) long, 9.7 millimetres (0.38 in) from front to back and 6.6 millimetres (0.26 in) wide at the base. The front part of the tooth was worn, indicating that it was shed when the animal was alive. It was further affected by taphonomic wear; the base of the tooth is irregular, so it may have been slightly longer in life. The curvature and length of the holotype tooth and the length of its hindmost cutting edge (carina) indicates it was in the front of the jaw.

The tooth is recurved with a backward bend, and is oval in cross-section. Its front and back cutting edges are finely serrated, extending two-thirds down each edge. There are six denticles per millimeter (0.04 in), and each denticle is square and chiseled. The overall form of the tooth, its width and shape in cross-section and its curvature resemble those in the maxilla (upper jawbone) and mandible of the species Dromaeosaurus albertensis from North America. Blood grooves are indistinct or absent, also similar to Dromaeosaurus, and differing from members of the Velociraptorinae subfamily. Dromaeosauroides differs from Dromaeosaurus in that the cutting edge at the front side is further from the middle of the tooth. Although the tooth is larger and the denticles similar, each denticle was smaller than those of Dromaeosaurus, which had only 13–20 denticles per 5 millimetres (0.20 in), instead of Dromaeosauroides' 30. The second known tooth is smaller—15 millimetres (0.59 in)—with the same features as the holotype.

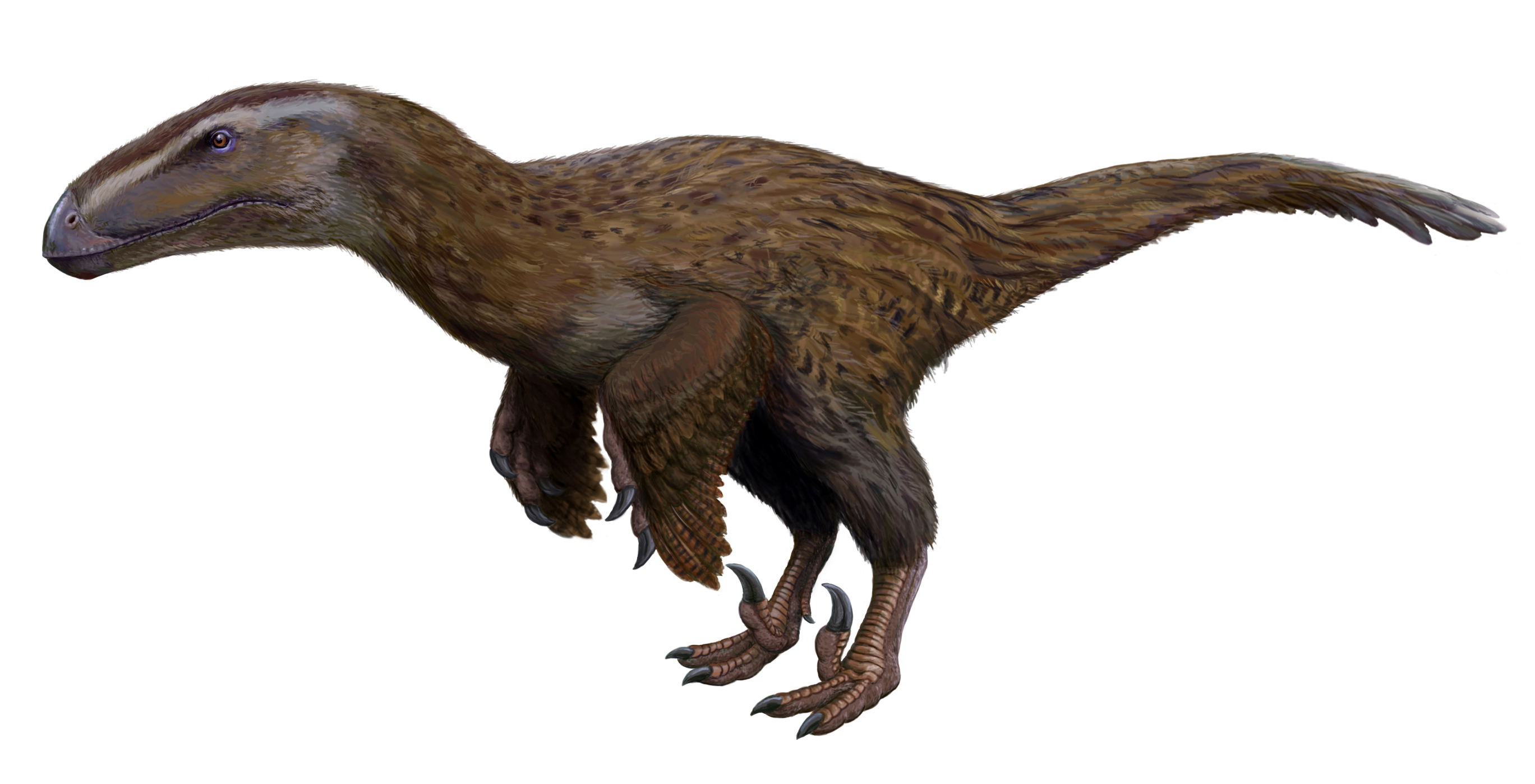
Hypothetical life restoration, based on related dromaeosaurs

The holotype tooth is roughly 25 percent larger than equivalent Dromaeosaurus teeth, from which a body length of 3 metres (120 in) or more was estimated for Dromaeosauroides; it may have been as long as 3 to 4 metres (9.8 to 13.1 ft). In an interview, Christiansen estimated its skull to be 35 centimetres (14 in) long and the animal's weight 40 kilograms (88 lb); a Bengal tiger of the same length would weigh 150 to 180 kilograms (330 to 400 lb) by comparison. The describers considered Dromaeosauroides a medium-sized dromaeosaurine. As a dromaeosaur, Dromaeosauroides would have had a large sickle claw on its highly mobile second toe, like its relatives Dromaeosaurus, Velociraptor and Deinonychus. That group is closely related to birds, and the NaturBornholm interpretive centre houses a roughly life-sized sculpture of Dromaeosauroides covered in feathers. Later Chinese finds of well-preserved feathered dromaeosaurs indicate that the sculpture should have more and longer feathers to be accurate. Although some smaller dromaeosaurs may have been able to fly, flight was unlikely for an animal the size of Dromaeosauroides.

== Classification ==
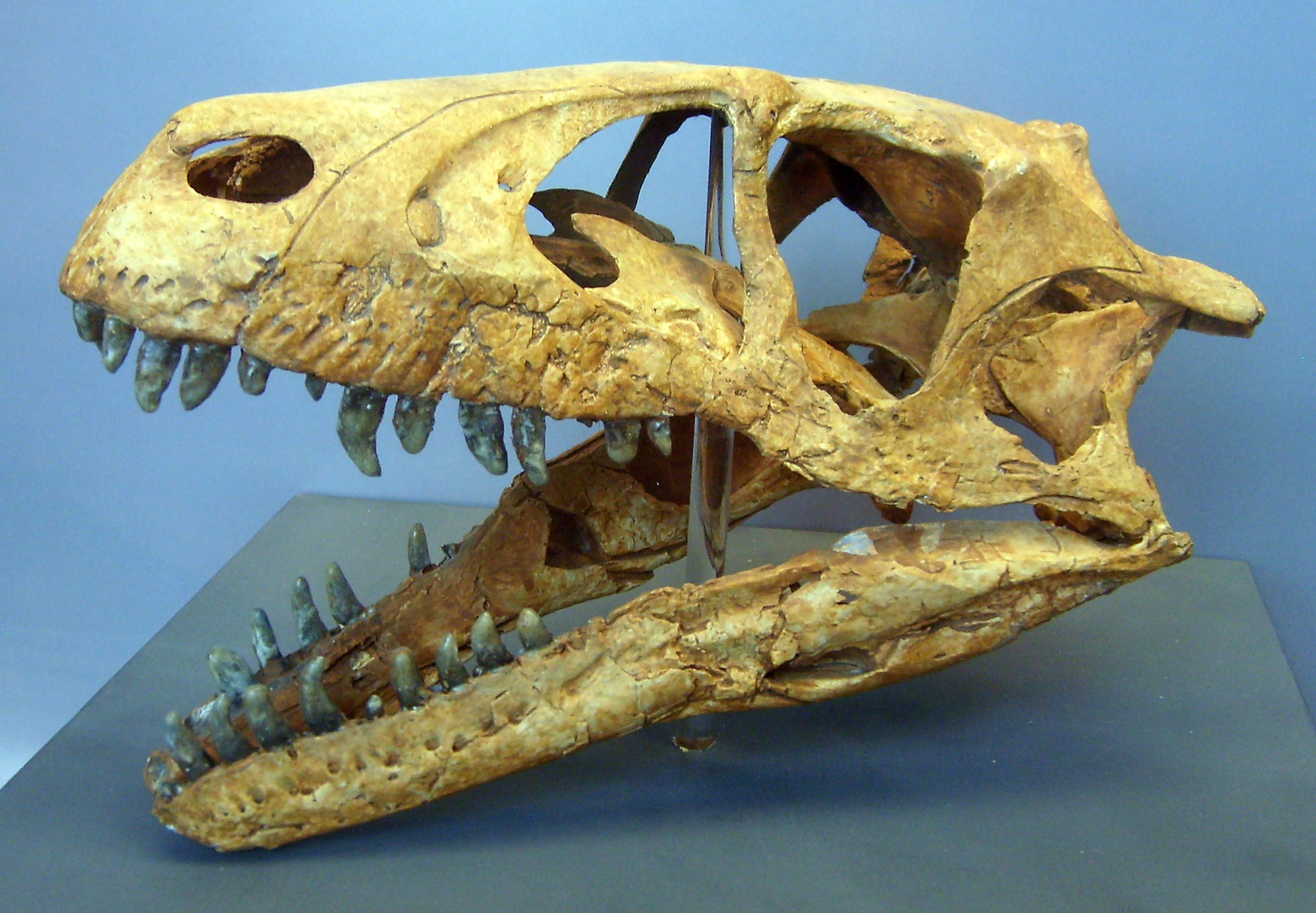
Skull cast of the similar relative Dromaeosaurus which the name Dromaeosauroides was derived from, in the Geological Museum of Copenhagen

Several features of the tooth are only known from members of the family Dromaeosauridae of theropod dinosaurs. In 2003, Christiansen and Bonde classified Dromaeosauroides as a member of the Dromaeosaurinae subfamily within the Dromaeosauridae, due to its similarity to Dromaeosaurus. Despite the resemblance, Dromaeosauroides is not considered part of that genus. It is unlikely that a genus would survive for 60 million years; Dromaeosauroides lived during the Early Cretaceous, and Dromaeosaurus during the Late Cretaceous. The differences between their denticles also indicate they should be kept separate.

According to Bonde and Christiansen, Dromaeosauroides is one of the oldest known dromaeosaurs in the world; older remains, for the most part, have only tentatively been assigned to Dromaeosauridae. Dromaeosauroides was the first definite dromaeosaurid known from the Early Cretaceous of Europe, depending on the identity of Nuthetes from the Middle Purbeck formation of the United Kingdom (which may slightly predate the Jydegaard Formation). It is uncertain whether the juvenile holotype specimen of Nuthetes has dromaeosaurid characteristics. Large specimens assigned to Nuthetes appear to belong to true dromaeosaurs, and may belong to Dromaeosauroides rather than Nuthetes. These specimens measure 15 to 18 millimetres (0.59 to 0.71 in). Bonde and Christiansen also pointed out that since the age of dromaeosaurs like Dromaeosauroides indicate the group had evolved by the Middle Jurassic, before the Late Jurassic Archaeopteryx, the stratigraphic gap between birds and dromaeosaurs, which some researchers have considered a serious problem for the suggested relationship between the two groups, is fictitious.

Dromaeosauroides was considered an indeterminate dromaeosaur by Johan Lindgren and colleagues in 2008. Bonde responded that since the teeth differ from those of other dromaeosaurs from the Early Cretaceous (and later members of the group, including Dromaeosaurus), it should be considered valid. He also said that these scientists had provided incorrect information about the location, strata and age of the specimen, and that the circumstances of its naming were no different from those of other tooth-based taxa. Oliver W. M. Rauhut and colleagues cautioned in 2010 that theropod teeth from the Late Jurassic/Early Cretaceous similar to those of dromaeosaurids may instead have belonged to the small tyrannosauroid Proceratosaurus or related taxa. Nicholas R. Longrich and colleagues stated in 2021 that Dromaeosauroides may have been an early eudromaeosaur.

== Palaeobiology ==
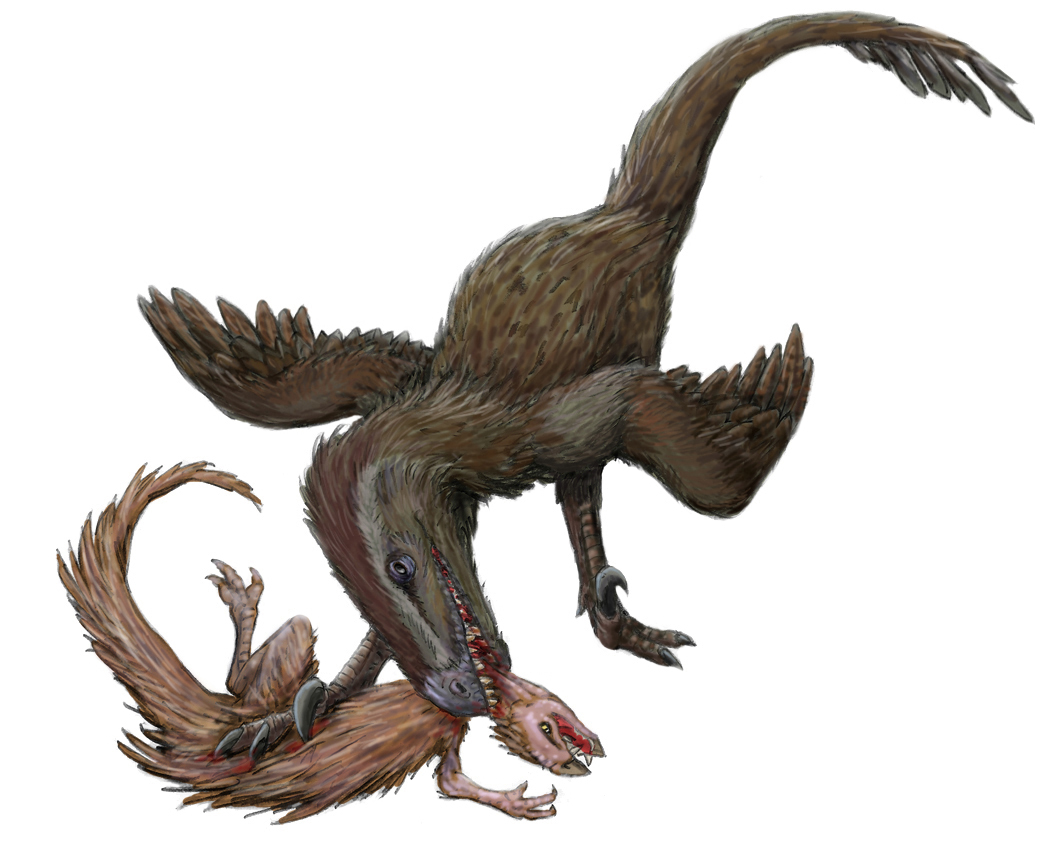
Nuthetes attacking Echinodon, based on teeth from the UK that may belong to Dromaeosauroides

Based on possible dromaeosaur coprolites from the Jydegaard Formation, which contained scales of the fish Lepidotes, Milàn and colleagues speculated that some dromaeosaurids were able to catch fish with the enlarged sickle claw on the second digit of the foot, similar to the "spear fishing" that has been proposed for the theropod Baryonyx and its enlarged thumb claw. The larger of the two coprolites has evidence of coprophagous organisms.

The palaeontologist Mark J. Powers and colleagues noted in 2022 that all dromaeosaurids with their deep maxillae are considered to have been predators, based on their relatively large size, few yet large serrated teeth, recurved claws including their sickle-claws, and a very developed olfactory system (sense of smell). The development of deep snouts in addition was probably an adaptation for handling vertebrate prey. The robust maxilla of Dromaeosaurus has been interpreted as giving it a more powerful and efficient bite than other dromaeosaurids.

Dromaeosaurids are thought to have used the large sickle-claws on their second toes to deal with prey, and theories about how this was done have ranged from using the claws for slashing to climbing up prey larger than themselves. A 2011 study by the palaeontologist Denver W. Fowler and colleagues found these ideas unlikely, and instead suggested the claws were used like those of modern birds of prey, to grip and pin down prey, and immobilise it while dismembering it with the mouth. Fowler and colleagues called this the "Raptor Prey Restraint" model, and added that the grasping feet showed a shift to using the feet instead of the hands for restraining prey, as the forelimbs became increasingly feathered. The forelimbs could instead have been used for "stability flapping" as seen in birds of prey, which, along with movement of the tail, would have helped the predator stay in position when struggling with the prey. In 2019, the palaeontologist Peter J. Bishop examined the biomechanics of dromaeosaurid sickle-claws through a musculoskeletal 3D model of the hindlimb of Deinonychus. The results supported that the claws were used for grasping and restraining prey smaller than the dromaeosaurid itself, but did not rule out other behaviours also involving crouching, such as stabbing and cutting prey at close quarters.

== Palaeoenvironment ==
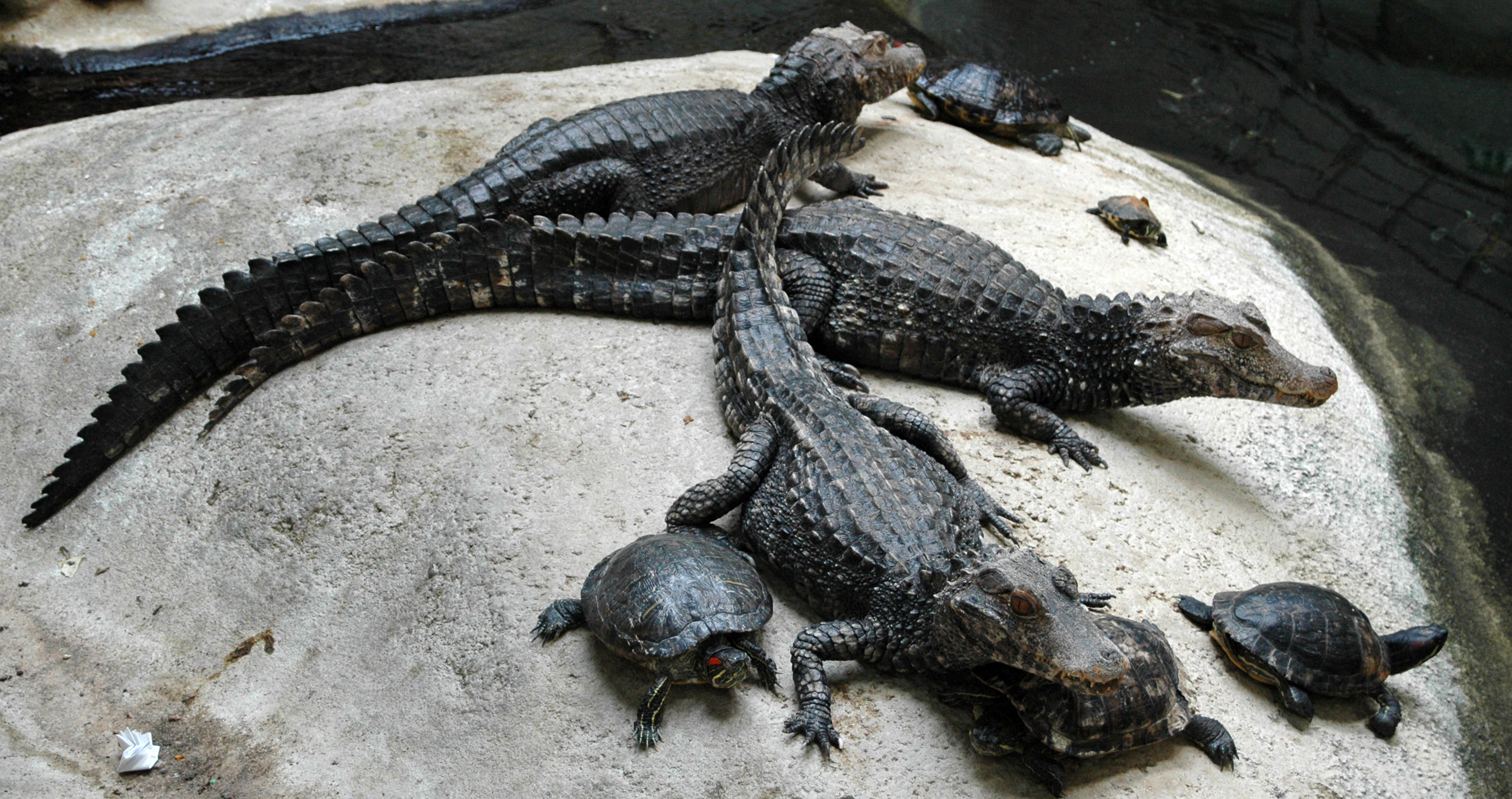
NaturBornholm has a lagoon diorama with a Dromaeosauroides model alongside live animals representing those that would have lived there during the Cretaceous

Only a corner of the Jydegaard Formation is exposed today; the remainder is overgrown. Jydegaard is part of the Nyker Group, which includes three formations (Rabekke, Robbedale, and Jydegaard) ranging from the Berriasian to the Valanginian ages of the Early Cretaceous. Jydegaard consists of sediments deposited in a fresh-to-brackish lagoon facing a coastal strip. In addition to Dromaeosauroides and a possible titanosaur, remains of hybodont sharks, fish such as Lepidotes and Pleuropholis, turtles, lizards, the crocodile Pholidosaurus and thin bone fragments from birds or pterosaurs have been found in the deposit. The bivalve Neomiodon is found in abundance in the sediments below (the Neomiodon Bed), indicating mass mortality, perhaps due to dinoflagellate toxins.

The fish and bivalves were found in clay which was probably a lagoon, and the dinosaurs and lizards in sand which probably was land, perhaps a beach; turtles and crocodiles were found in both. Freshwater snails were found in clay that may have been shallow, drying lakes behind a sandy barrier between lagoon and sea, in a setting perhaps similar to the Florida Keys or the southwestern coast of Jutland. Dinosaurs may have fed there, based on the remains of plants and small land animals, and theropods may have hunted along the shore. Bornholm and Scania appear to be the only places were remains of the Scandinavian-Russian fauna of the Early Cretaceous can be found. Further investigations there may show whether this fauna has European or Asian affinities.

== See also ==
- Timeline of dromaeosaurid research
