= Nyker Group =

Group of geological formations in Denmark

- Stratigraphic range: Latest Jurassic-Early Cretaceous; ~146–140 Ma
- Type: Geological unit
- Sub-units: Rabekke, Robbedale & Jydegaard Formations
- Underlies: Arnager Greensand Formation
- Overlies: Bagå Formation

Lithology
- Primary: Claystone, sandstone

Location
- Region: Bornholm
- Country: Denmark

The Nyker Group is a group of geological formations from the Early Cretaceous, about 146 to 140 million years ago. It is on the island of Bornholm, Denmark. It includes the Rabekke, Robbedale and Jydegaard Formations.

== Rabekke Formation ==
The Rabekke Formation is the lowermost formation of the Nyker Group. It dates to about 146 to 145 million years ago, at the Jurassic-Cretaceous boundary. The formation has the significance of having the first Scandinavian mammal, Sunnyodon notleyi, uncovered from it. Many crocodilomorphs and other vertebrates have been recovered from it.

== Robbedale Formation ==
The Robbedale Formation is the middle formation of the Nyker Group. It dates to about 145 million years ago. No vertebrate fossils have been recovered from the formation.

== Jydegaard Formation ==
The Jydegaard Formation is the uppermost formation of the Nyker Group. It dates to around 145 to 140 million years ago. The first dinosaur found on Denmark, Dromaeosauroides bornholmensis, was discovered in this formation. Many vertebrates have been recovered from it.

== See also ==
- List of fossiliferous stratigraphic units in Denmark
