= List of fossiliferous stratigraphic units in Denmark =

Group or Formation	Period	Notes
Gram Formation	Tortonian	
Odderup Formation	Neogene	
Branden Clay Formation	Paleogene	
Brejning Clay Formation	Paleogene	
Bryozoan Limestone Formation	Paleogene	
Cerithium Limestone Formation	Paleogene	
Fur Formation	Ypresian	
Lellinge Greensand Formation	Paleogene	
Lellinge Greensand Limestone Formation	Paleogene	
Mo Formation	Paleogene	
Stolleklint Clay Formation	Paleogene	
Vejle Fjord Formation	Paleogene	
Viborg Formation	Paleogene	
Ølst Formation	Paleogene	
Arnager Greensand Formation	Cretaceous	
Arnager Limestone Formation	Cretaceous	
Bavnodde Greensand Formation	Cretaceous	
Danish White Chalk Formation	Cretaceous	
Maastrichtian chalk Formation	Cretaceous	
Nyker Group - Jydegaard Formation	late Berriasian-early Valanginian	
Nyker Group - Robbedale Formation	mid Berriasian	
Nyker Group - Rabekke Formation	latest Tithonian - earliest Berriasian	
Bornholm Group - Bagå Formation	Aalenian-Bathonian	
Bornholm Group - Sorthat Formation	latest Pliensbachian-Toarcian	
Bornholm Group - Hasle Formation	late Pliensbachian	
Bornholm Group - Rønne Formation	mid Hettangian-early Pliensbachian	
Fjerritslev Formation	Jurassic	
Komstad Formation	Ordovician	
Alum Shale Formation	Cambrian	
Andrarum Limestone Formation	Cambrian	
Ardrarum Limestone Formation	Cambrian	
Exsulans Limestone Formation	Cambrian	
Hardeberga Formation	Cambrian	
Kalby marl Formation	Cambrian	
Læså Formation	Early Cambrian	
Norretorp Formation	Cambrian	

== See also ==
- Lists of fossiliferous stratigraphic units in Europe
  - List of fossiliferous stratigraphic units in Norway
  - List of fossiliferous stratigraphic units in Sweden
  - List of fossiliferous stratigraphic units in Germany
