= Quercus lobbii =

Conservation status
- Endangered (IUCN 3.1)

Scientific classification
- Kingdom: Plantae
- Clade: Embryophytes
- Clade: Tracheophytes
- Clade: Spermatophytes
- Clade: Angiosperms
- Clade: Eudicots
- Clade: Rosids
- Order: Fagales
- Family: Fagaceae
- Genus: Quercus
- Subgenus: Quercus subg. Cerris
- Section: Quercus sect. Cyclobalanopsis
- Species: Q. lobbii

Binomial name
- Quercus lobbii Hook.f. & Thomson ex Ettingsh. (1883)

Synonyms
- Cyclobalanopsis lobbii (Ettingsh.) Y.C.Hsu & H.Wei Jen; Quercus lineata var. lobbii (Hook. f. & Thomson ex Ettingsh.) Wenz.

Species of tree

Quercus lobbii is an uncommon species of tree in the beech family Fagaceae. It is native to Bangladesh and northeastern India and to western Yunnan Province in southwestern China. It is placed in subgenus Cerris, section Cyclobalanopsis.

Quercus lobbii is a tree up to 10 meters tall. Leaves can be as much as 7 cm long.
