= Jydegaard Formation =

Danish geologic formation

- Stratigraphic range: Late Berriasian-early Valanginian; ~145–139 Ma
- Type: Geological formation
- Unit of: Nyker Group
- Sub-units: Rødbjerg & Tornhøj Members
- Underlies: Arnager Greensand Formation
- Overlies: Robbedale Formation

Lithology
- Primary: Claystone, sandstone

Location
- Coordinates: 55.1°N 14.8°E
- Approximate paleocoordinates: 47.2°N 21.4°E
- Region: Bornholm
- Country: Denmark
- Jydegaard Formation (Denmark)

The Jydegaard Formation (also spelled as 'Jydegård') is a geological formation dating to the Early Cretaceous, about 145–139 million years ago. It is on the island of Bornholm, Denmark. Vertebrate fossils have been found in the formation.

== Fossil content ==
Thin bone fragments have been uncovered that may belong to pterosaurs or birds.

=== Dinosaurs ===
A tooth possibly belonging to a juvenile titanosaur has been found in the formation.

Genus	Species	Location	Material	Description	Images
Dromaeosauroides	D. bornholmensis	Robbedale	Two teeth and possible coprolites.		Holotype tooth Life Reconstruction

=== Crocodylomorphs ===
Genus	Species	Location	Material	Description	Images
Pholidosaurus	unknown	Robbedale	A tooth tentatively referred to Pholidosaurus		Possible tooth

=== Fish ===
Fish remains have been found in coprolites possibly belonging to the dromaeosaur Dromaeosauroides or marine turtles. Also, unidentified pycnodont jaws and two small stem-teleosteans have been uncovered. Amioid scales have also been revealed.

Genus	Species	Location	Material	Description	Images
Lepidotes	L. sp	Robbedale	Teeth, jaws and scales		
Hybodus	unknown	Robbedale	Teeth and scales		
Parvodus	P. rugianus	Robbedale	Teeth, finspines and head "hooks"		
Pleuropholis	P. serrata	Robbedale	unknown		

=== Turtles ===
Unidentified turtle carapaces have been uncovered in the Formation.

=== Lizards ===
A lower jaw from a lizard has been recovered from the formation.

=== Bivalves ===
Genus	Species	Location	Material	Description	Images
Neomiodon	unknown	Robbedale	many specimens	Neomiodon specimens are thought to be victim to a mass mortality such as poisoning.	
Viviparus	unknown	Robbedale	many specimens	Viviparus specimens are thought to be victim to a mass mortality such as poisoning.	

Color key: Taxon / Reclassified taxon / Taxon falsely reported as present / Dubious taxon or junior synonym / Ichnotaxon / Ootaxon / Morphotaxon	Notes; Uncertain or tentative taxa are in small text; ~~crossed out~~ taxa are discredited.

== See also ==
- List of fossiliferous stratigraphic units in Denmark
