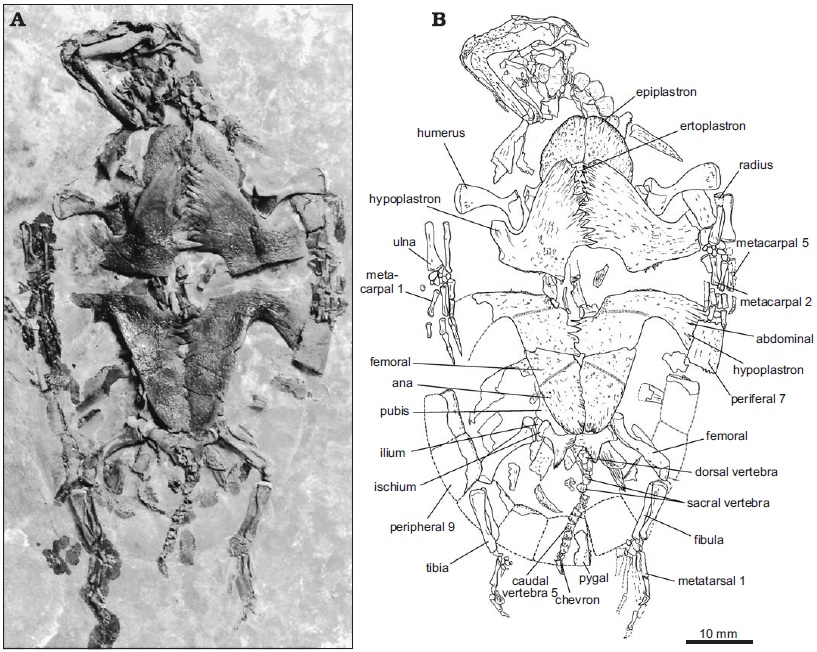

Scientific classification
- Domain: Eukaryota
- Kingdom: Animalia
- Phylum: Chordata
- Class: Reptilia
- Order: Testudines
- Suborder: Cryptodira
- Infraorder: Eucryptodira
- Genus: †Hoyasemys; Pérez-García, Fuente & Ortega, 2011

Species
- †H. jimenezi Pérez-García, Fuente & Ortega, 2011 (type)

= Hoyasemys =

Hoyasemys Temporal range: Early Cretaceous, Barremian

Extinct genus of turtles

Hoyasemys (meaning "turtle of Las Hoyas") is an extinct genus of basal eucryptodiran freshwater turtle from Lower Cretaceous (upper Barremian stage) deposits of Cuenca Province, Spain. It is known from the holotype MCCM-LH 84, a nearly complete and articulated skeleton including the skull. It was found in the 1980s from the Las Hoyas site of the Calizas de La Huérguina Formation, near La Cierva township, Spain. It was first named by Adán Pérez-García, Marcelo S. de la Fuente and Francisco Ortega in 2011 and the type species is Hoyasemys jimenezi. The generic name is derived from the word Hoyas meaning "the basin" in Spanish, which refers to the Las Hoyas fossil site it was found in, and emys ("freshwater turtle" in Greek). The specific name honors Dr. Emiliano Jiménez Fuentes.

== Phylogeny ==
Cladogram after Pérez-García, Fuente & Ortega, 2011:

- Pancryptodira
  - Dorsetochelys
  - - Paracryptodira
    - Eucryptodira
      - Plesiochelys
      - - - Solnhofia
          - - Santanachelys
            - Thalassemys
        - - Xinjiangchelys
          - - Kirgizemys
            - - - Hoyasemys
                - Judithemys
                - Dracochelys
                - - Ordosemys
                  - Sinemys
              - Cryptodira
