= Rabekke Formation =

Geologic formation in Denmark

- Stratigraphic range: Latest Tithonian-earliest Berriasian; ~146–143 Ma
- Type: Geological Formation
- Unit of: Nyker Group
- Sub-units: Homanshald & Skyttegård Members
- Underlies: Robbedale Formation
- Overlies: Bagå Formation

Lithology
- Primary: Claystone, mudstone, siltstone

Location
- Coordinates: 55.1°N 14.8°E
- Approximate paleocoordinates: 46.5°N 21.5°E
- Region: Bornholm
- Country: Denmark
- Rabekke Formation (Denmark)

The Rabekke Formation is a geological formation dating to the latest Jurassic or earliest Cretaceous, around 146 to 145 million years ago. The formation crops out on the island of Bornholm, Denmark. Vertebrate fossils have been found in the formation.

== Fossil content ==
=== Dinosaurs ===
Small dromaeosaurid and indeterminate maniraptoran teeth have been uncovered in this formation. Sauropod tracks have also been found.

=== Mammals ===
| Genus | Species | Location | Material | Description | Images |
|---|---|---|---|---|---|
| Sunnyodon | S. notleyi | Bornholm, Denmark | Tooth | | |

=== Crocodylomorphs ===
| Genus | Species | Location | Material | Description | Images |
|---|---|---|---|---|---|
| Bernissartia | B. sp | Bornholm, Denmark | Teeth | | |
| Goniopholis | G. sp | Bornholm, Denmark | Teeth | | |
| Theriosuchus | T. sp | Bornholm, Denmark | Teeth | | |

| Color key: Taxon / Reclassified taxon / Taxon falsely reported as present / Dubious taxon or junior synonym / Ichnotaxon / Ootaxon / Morphotaxon | Notes; Uncertain or tentative taxa are in small text; ~~crossed out~~ taxa are discredited. |

=== Birds ===
Small possible bird teeth have been identified in this formation.

=== Turtles ===
Unidentified turtle carapaces have been recovered from the formation.

=== Fish ===
Scales and jawbones of actinopterygian have been uncovered.

=== Amphibians ===
Postcranial elements of amphibians have been identified.

=== Lizards ===
Postcranial remains from lizards have been recovered.

== See also ==
- List of dinosaur-bearing rock formations
- List of fossiliferous stratigraphic units in Denmark
