= Constantin von Ettingshausen =

Austrian botanist

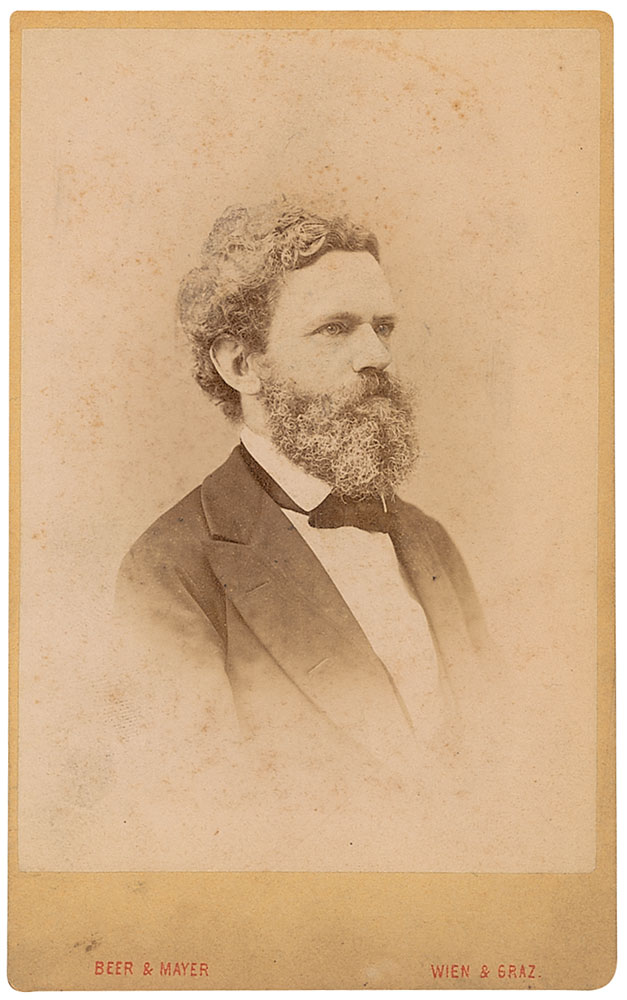
- Carte-de-visite
- Born: 16 June 1826; Vienna, Austria
- Died: 1 February 1897 (aged 70); Graz, Austria
- Education: University of Vienna
- Known for: Tertiary floras of Europe, and fossil floras of Australia and New Zealand
- Father: Andreas von Ettingshausen
- Scientific career
- Fields: Botany, palaeobotany
- Workplaces: University of Graz; Natural History Museum, London
- Author abbrev. (botany): Ettingsh.

Constantin Freiherr von Ettingshausen (or Baron Constantin von Ettingshausen) (16 June 1826 in Vienna – 1 February 1897 in Graz) was an Austrian botanist known for his paleobotanical studies of flora from the Tertiary era. He was the son of physicist Andreas von Ettingshausen.

== Biography ==
In 1848 he graduated as a doctor of medicine in Vienna, and after working in the Geologische Reichsanstalt he became in 1854 a professor of botany and natural history at the medical and surgical military academy (Josephinium) in that city. In 1871 he was chosen professor of botany at Graz, a position which he maintained until the close of his life.

From 1876 he made repeated visits to London, where he arranged collections at the Natural History Museum. He was distinguished for his researches on the Tertiary floras of various parts of Europe, and on the fossil floras of Australia and New Zealand. The extinct genus Ettingshausenia (family Vitaceae) was named in his honor by August Wilhelm Stiehler (1857).

== Publications ==
- Physiotypia plantarum austriacarum (with Alois Pokorny), 1856 –.
- Physiographie der Medicinal Pflanzen (1862).
- Die Farnkruter der Jetztwelt zur Untersuchung and Bestimmung der in den Formationen der Erdrinde eingeschiossenen Uberreste von vorweltlichen Arten dieser Ordnung nach dem Flächen-Skelet bearbeitet (1865).
- A Monograph of the British Eocene Flora (with John Starkie Gardner), vol. 1. Filices, 1879-82. -- vol. 2. Gymnospermæ, by J. Gardner. 1883-86.
- Contributions to the Tertiary flora of Australia (translated by Arvid Neilson, 1888).
- Contributions to the knowledge of the fossil flora of New Zealand (translated by C. Juhl, 1890).
