= Austropleuropholis =

Austropleuropholis Temporal range: Kimmeridgian

Scientific classification
- Domain: Eukaryota
- Kingdom: Animalia
- Phylum: Chordata
- Class: Actinopterygii
- Family: †Pleuropholidae
- Genus: †Austropleuropholis de Saint Seine, 1955
- Species: †A. lombardi

Binomial name
- †Austropleuropholis lombardi de Saint Seine, 1955

Extinct genus of ray-finned fishes

Austropleuropholis is an extinct genus of freshwater ray-finned fish that lived during the Late Jurassic. It contains a single species, A. lombardi, from the Kimmeridigian of the Democratic Republic of the Congo, from the terrestrial/freshwater series of the Stanleyville Formation.

== See also ==
- List of prehistoric bony fish genera
