= Parapleuropholis =

Parapleuropholis Temporal range: Early Toarcian

Scientific classification
- Domain: Eukaryota
- Kingdom: Animalia
- Phylum: Chordata
- Class: Actinopterygii
- Family: †Pleuropholidae
- Genus: †Parapleuropholis de Saint Seine, 1955

Species
- †P. koreni; †P. olbrechtsi

Extinct genus of ray-finned fishes

Parapleuropholis is an extinct genus of ray-finned fish that lived in what is now the Democratic Republic of the Congo during the early Toarcian stage of the Early Jurassic epoch.
