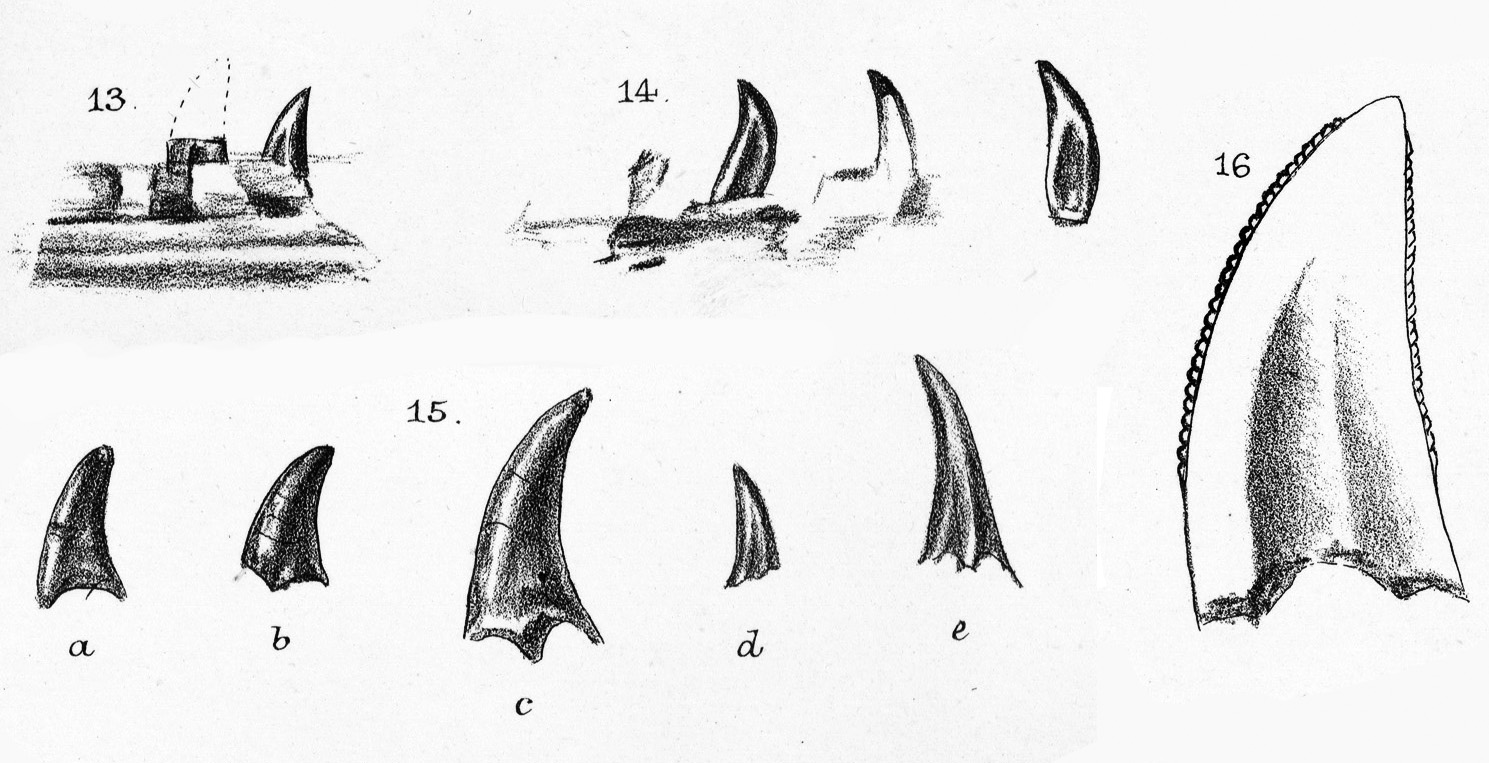
- Portions of the holotype mandible and close up of a tooth

Scientific classification
- Kingdom: Animalia
- Phylum: Chordata
- Class: Reptilia
- Clade: Dinosauria
- Clade: Saurischia
- Clade: Theropoda
- Genus: †Nuthetes; Owen, 1854
- Species: †N. destructor

Binomial name
- †Nuthetes destructor Owen, 1854

Synonyms
- Megalosaurus destructor (Steel, 1970)

= Nuthetes =

Nuthetes Temporal range: Early Cretaceous, 143 Ma

Extinct genus of dinosaurs

Nuthetes is a genus of coelurosaurian theropod dinosaur, either a dromaeosaurid or tyrannosauroid, known only from fossil teeth and jaw fragments found in rocks of the middle Berriasian age (Early Cretaceous) in the Cherty Freshwater Member of the Lulworth Formation in England and also the Angeac-Charente bonebed in France. If it was a dromaeosaurid, Nuthetes would have been a small predator.

== Discovery and naming ==
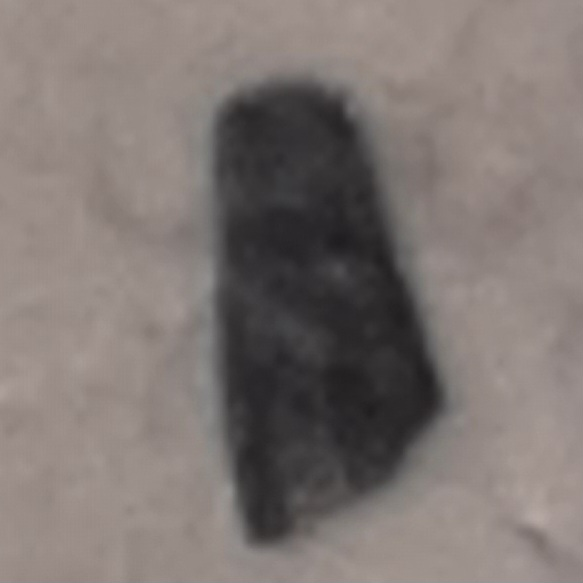
Tooth tip of N. destructor from the Lulworth Formation

The holotype, DORCM G 913, was collected by Charles Willcox, an amateur paleontologist living at Swanage, from the Feather Quarry near Durlston Bay in a marine deposition of Cherty Freshwater Member of the Lulworth Formation, dating from the middle Berriasian. It consists of an about three inch long left dentary fragment with nine teeth. The holotype was once thought to be lost but was rediscovered during the 1970s in the Dorset County Museum. Later several other teeth and specimen BMNH 48207, another dentary fragment from a somewhat smaller individual, were referred to the species. Owen in 1878 also assumed some fossilised scutes, of a type for which he coined the name "granicones", belonged to Nuthetes but these were in 2002 shown to be limb or tail osteoderms of a turtle, possibly "Helochelydra" anglica or "H." bakewelli. In 2006 a tooth from France found at the Berriasian aged Cherves-de-Cognac locality, specimen CHEm03.537, was referred to a Nuthetes sp. Some large specimens referred to Nuthetes may instead belong to Dromaeosauroides. Additional teeth have been attributed to Nuthetes from the nearby Angeac-Charente bonebed in western France.

The genus Nuthetes contains one species (the type species), Nuthetes destructor. N. destructor was named and described by Richard Owen in 1854. The generic name Nuthetes is derived from the Koine Greek nouthetes, a contraction of νουθέτητης (nouthetetes) meaning "one who admonishes" or "a monitor," in reference to the similarity of Nuthetes teeth to those of a modern monitor lizard. The specific name is Latin for "destroyer", a reference to "the adaptations of the teeth for piercing, cutting, and lacerating the prey" of a form he estimated to be equal in size to the present Bengal monitor.

== Classification ==
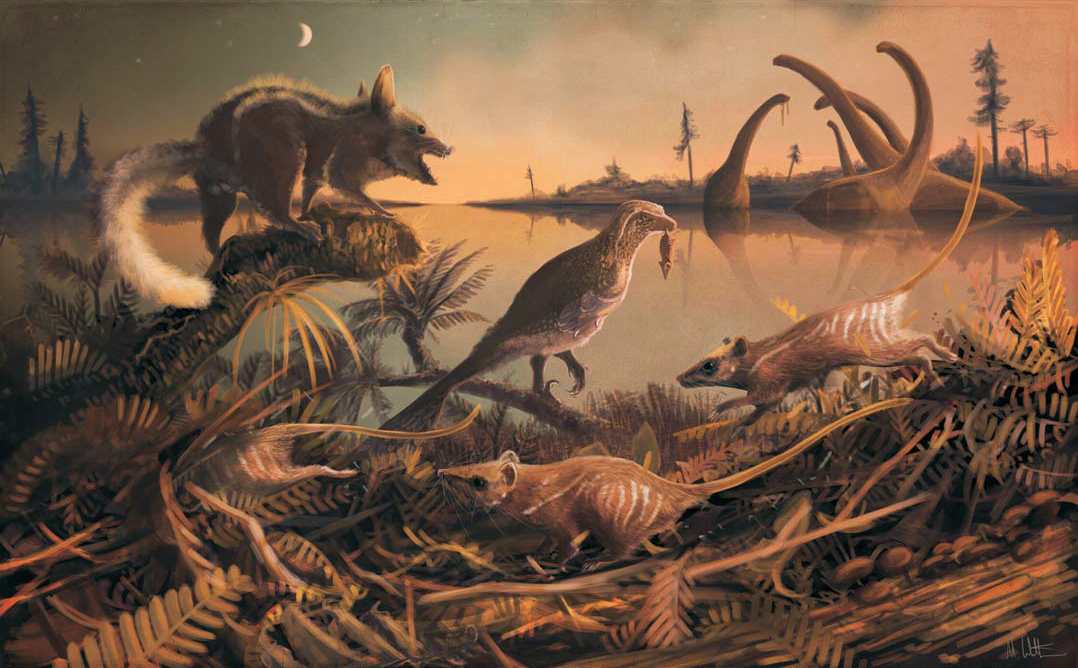
Restoration of Nuthetes (centre) depicted as a dromaeosaur capturing a Durlstotherium

Nuthetes was originally classified by Owen as a lizard and a varanid; later he changed his mind concluding it was a crocodilian. Only in 1888 Richard Lydekker did understand it was a dinosaur. In 1934 William Elgin Swinton thought it was a juvenile member of the Megalosauridae. In 1970 Rodney Steel even renamed the species Megalosaurus destructor. In 2002 however, a re-examination of the fossils by paleontologist Angela Milner showed that they most likely belonged to a subadult dromaeosaurid. Steve Sweetman examined five good specimens of fossil teeth and confirmed that they belong to Nuthetes destructor, and concluded that this species is a velociraptorine dromaeosaurid. If this placement is correct, it would have been one of the oldest dromaeosaurids known, the first to be described, and the first known from Britain. However, Rauhut, Milner and Moore-Fay (2010) pointed out the great similarity of the teeth of basal tyrannosauroid Proceratosaurus to the teeth of velociraptorine dromaeosaurids. The authors recommended caution when referring to isolated teeth from the Late Jurassic or Early Cretaceous to the Dromaeosauridae (explicitly citing Milner's 2002 study and Sweetman's 2004 study as examples of studies that identified isolated theropod teeth as belonging to dromaeosaurids), as these teeth might belong to proceratosaurid tyrannosauroids instead.

According to Milner, Nuthetes can be diagnosed for having a tooth denticle size difference index ranging from 1-14 to 1-55.

== See also ==
- Timeline of dromaeosaurid research
