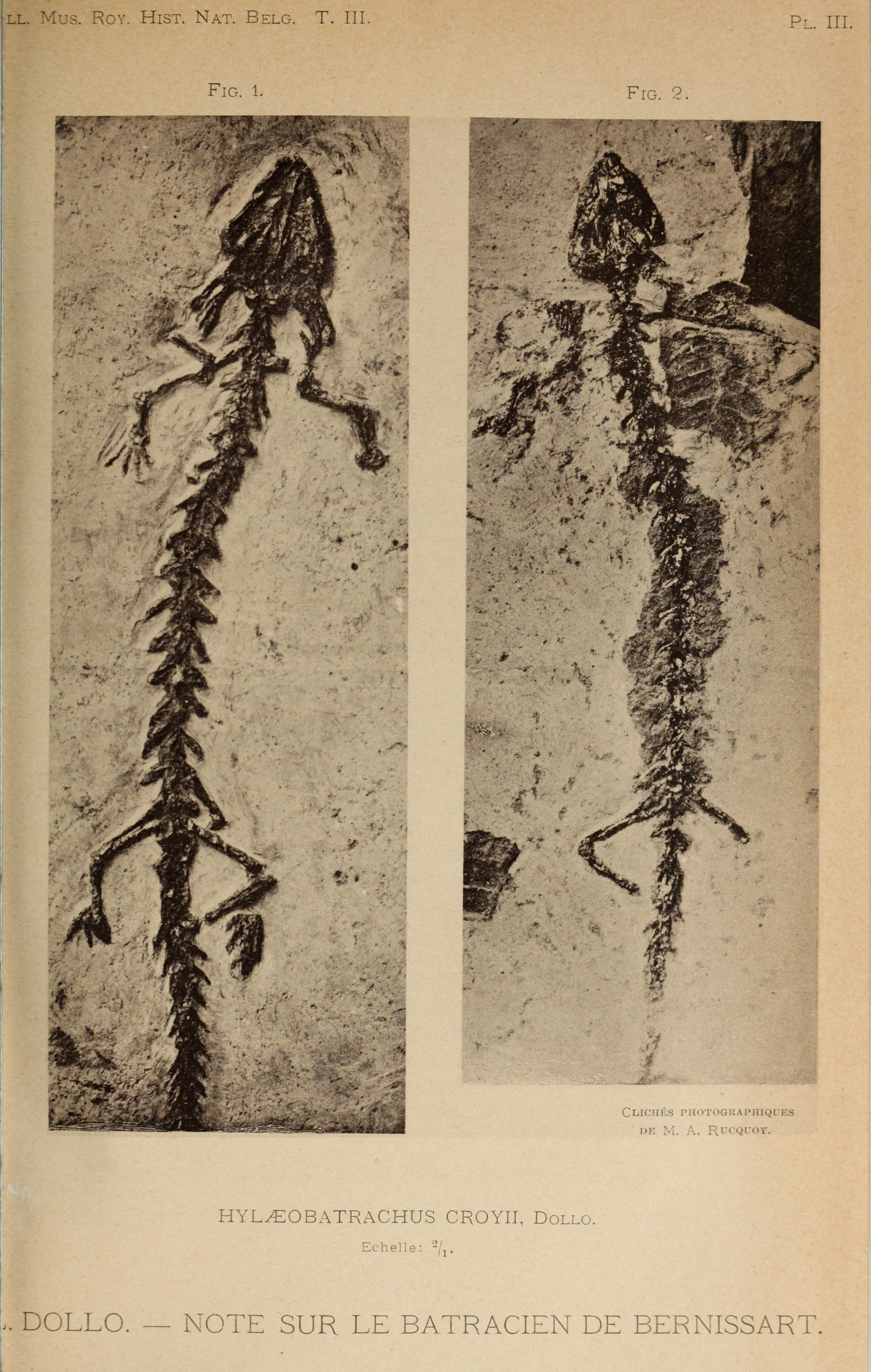
- Slab and counterslab of holotype specimen

Scientific classification
- Kingdom: Animalia
- Phylum: Chordata
- Class: Amphibia
- Clade: Caudata
- Genus: †Hylaeobatrachus; Dollo, 1884

Type species
- † Hylaeobatrachus croyii Dollo, 1884

= Hylaeobatrachus =

Hylaeobatrachus Temporal range: Barremian

Extinct genus of amphibians

Hylaeobatrachus is an extinct genus of prehistoric salamander, known from the Early Cretaceous of Europe. The type species H. croyii is known from the Sainte-Barbe Clays Formation at the Iguanodon locality of Belgium, and was described by Louis Dollo. An unnamed Hylaeobatrachus-like taxon has also been reported from Las Hoyas, Spain. Both localities are of Barremian age. Hylaeobatrachus belongs to the crown group of modern salamanders, though its exact relationship with modern salamander groups is uncertain. It was neotenic, like some modern salamanders.

== See also ==
- Prehistoric amphibian
- List of prehistoric amphibians
