= Robbedale Formation =

Geologic formation in Denmark

- Stratigraphic range: Mid Berriasian; ~142 Ma
- Type: Geological Formation
- Unit of: Nyker Group
- Sub-units: Østerborg & Langebjerg Members
- Underlies: Jydegaard Formation
- Overlies: Rabekke Formation

Lithology
- Primary: Sandstone

Location
- Coordinates: 55.2°N 15.0°E
- Approximate paleocoordinates: 46.6°N 21.7°E
- Region: Bornholm
- Country: Denmark
- Robbedale Formation (Denmark)

The Robbedale Formation is a geological formation dating to the Berriasian age of the Early Cretaceous, about 142 million years ago. It is on the island of Bornholm, Denmark.

== See also ==
- List of fossiliferous stratigraphic units in Denmark
