= La Cierva =

- Municipality
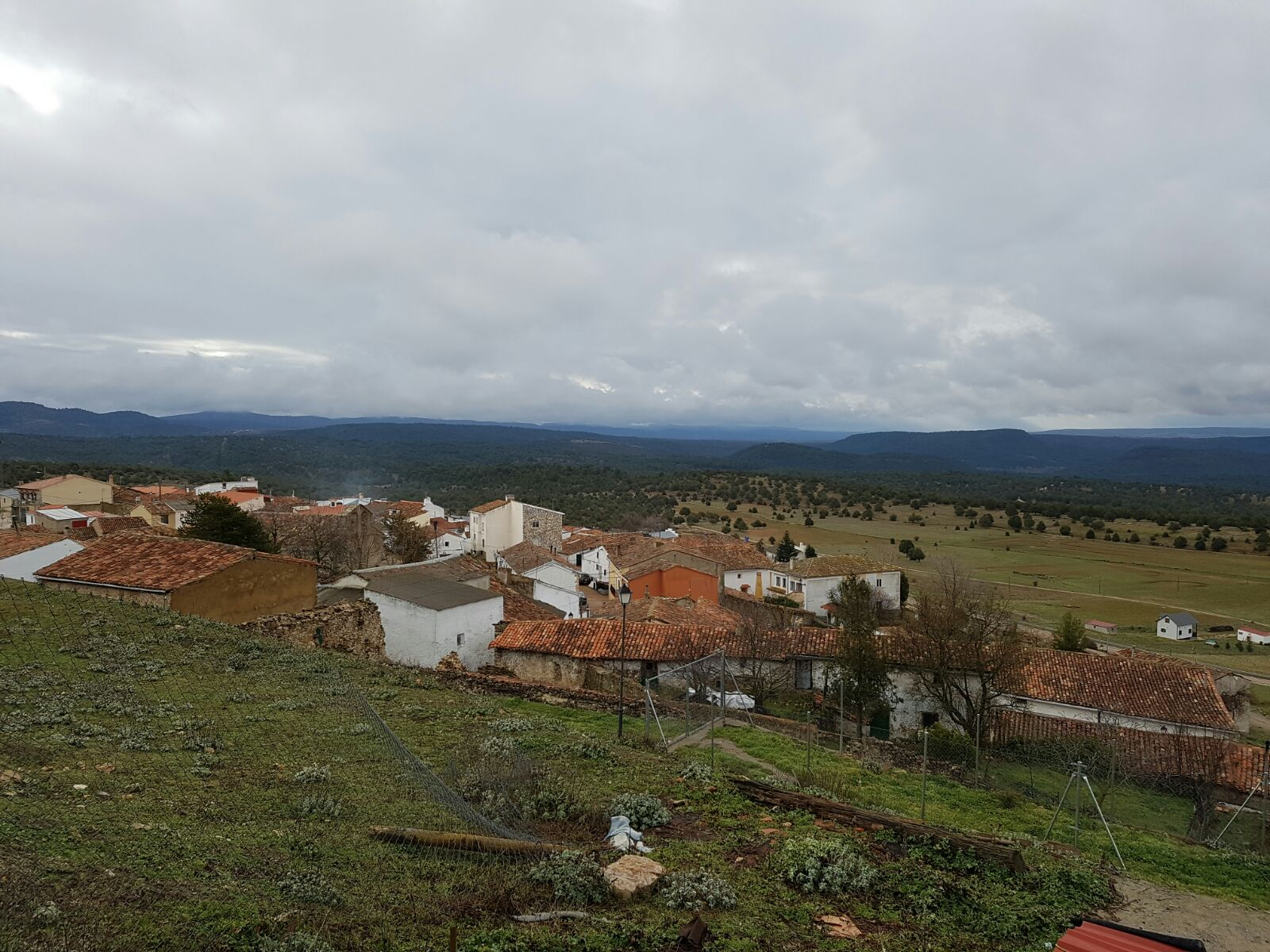
- View of La cierva

- Flag Coat of arms

- Location within Spain Location within Castilla-La Mancha
- Coordinates: 40°03′N 1°51′W
- Country: Spain
- Autonomous community: Castile-La Mancha
- Province: Cuenca

Population (2025-01-01)
  - Total: 39
- Time zone: UTC+1 (CET)
  - Summer (DST): UTC+2 (CEST)

La Cierva is a municipality in Cuenca, Castile-La Mancha, Spain. It has a population of 52.
