= Huérguina =

- Municipality
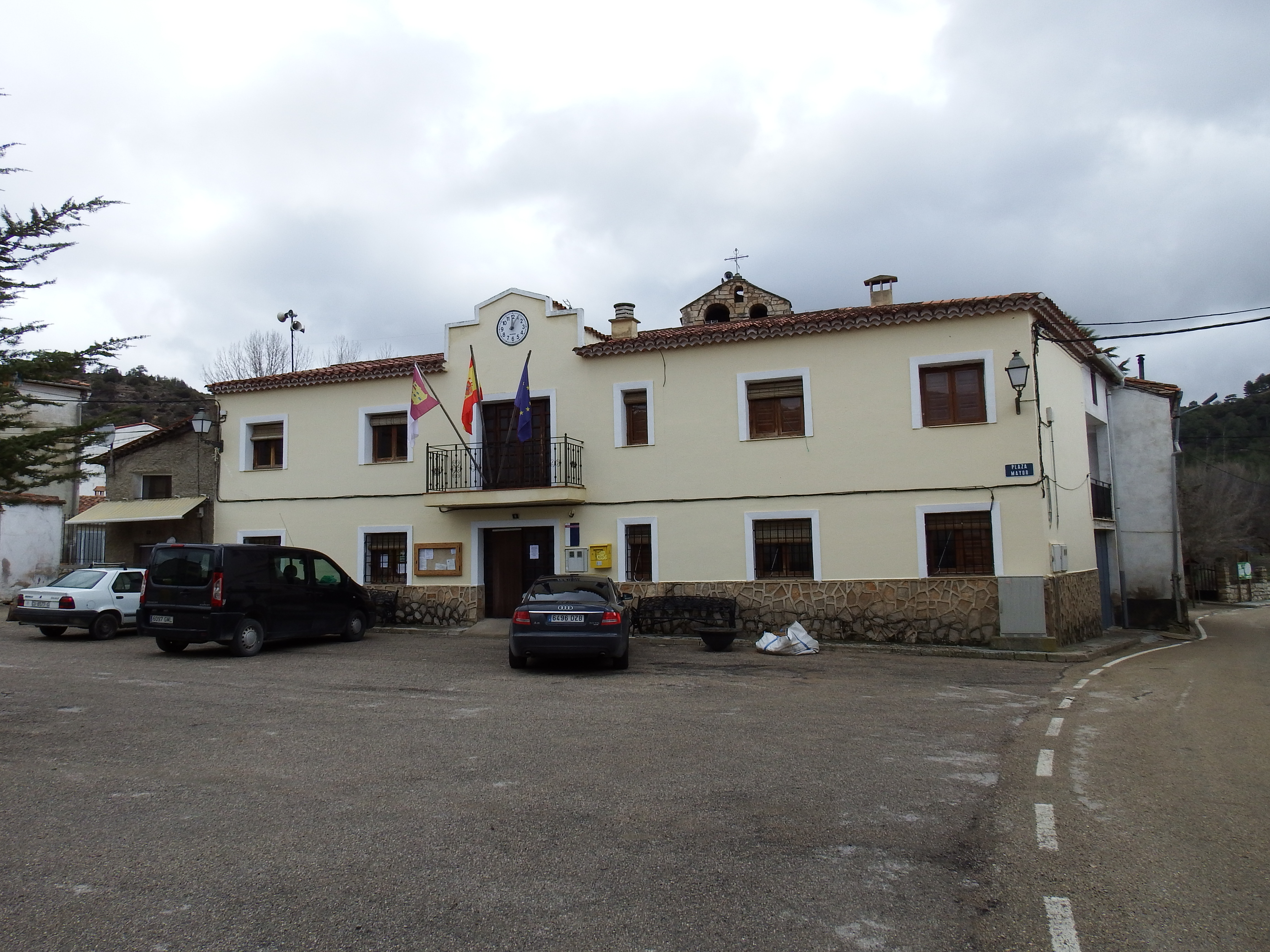
- Town hall

- Location within Spain Location within Castilla-La Mancha
- Coordinates: 40°02′N 1°36′W
- Country: Spain
- Autonomous community: Castile-La Mancha
- Province: Cuenca

Population (2025-01-01)
  - Total: 41
- Time zone: UTC+1 (CET)
  - Summer (DST): UTC+2 (CEST)

Huérguina is a municipality in Cuenca, Castile-La Mancha, Spain. In January 2003, it had a population of 108; in January 2022, the population was 50.
