= August Wilhelm Stiehler =

German government official and paleobotanist

August Wilhelm Stiehler (6 August 1797, Neumarkt – May 1878, Quedlinburg) was a German government official and paleobotanist.

He studied law at the University of Leipzig, and for many years worked as a civil servant in the town of Wernigerode. During the last twenty years of his life he resided in Quedlinburg.

He is remembered for his paleobotanical research in the Harz Mountains of Germany. As a taxonomist he circumscribed the extinct genera Weichselia and Ettingshausenia. During his career he took part in correspondence with other scientists that included Alexander von Humboldt and Leopold von Buch. His collection of fossils were acquired by the University of Halle. The genus Stiehleria (fossil incertae sedis) commemorates his name.

== Selected works ==
- Beitrage zur Kenntniss der vorweltlichen Flora des Kreidegebirges im Harze, Palaeontographica (1846–1933) Band 05 Lieferung 3 (1857), p. 71 - 80. – Contribution to the knowledge of ancient flora from the chalk mountains in the Harz.
- Allgemeine Bemerkungen über das Kreidegebirge zu Blankenburg und in der Grafschaft Wernigerode, (1858) – General comments on the chalk mountains of Blankenburg and in the county of Wernigerode.
- Synopsis Der Pflanzenkunde Der Vorwelt, Volume 1 (1861) – Synopsis of botany of the ancient world.
- "Palaeophytologiae statum recentem exemplo Monocotyledonearum et Dicotyledonearum Angiospermarum Gamopetalarum. 1. Pars: Monocotyledoneae in statu fossili (in universum consideratae)", (1869).
