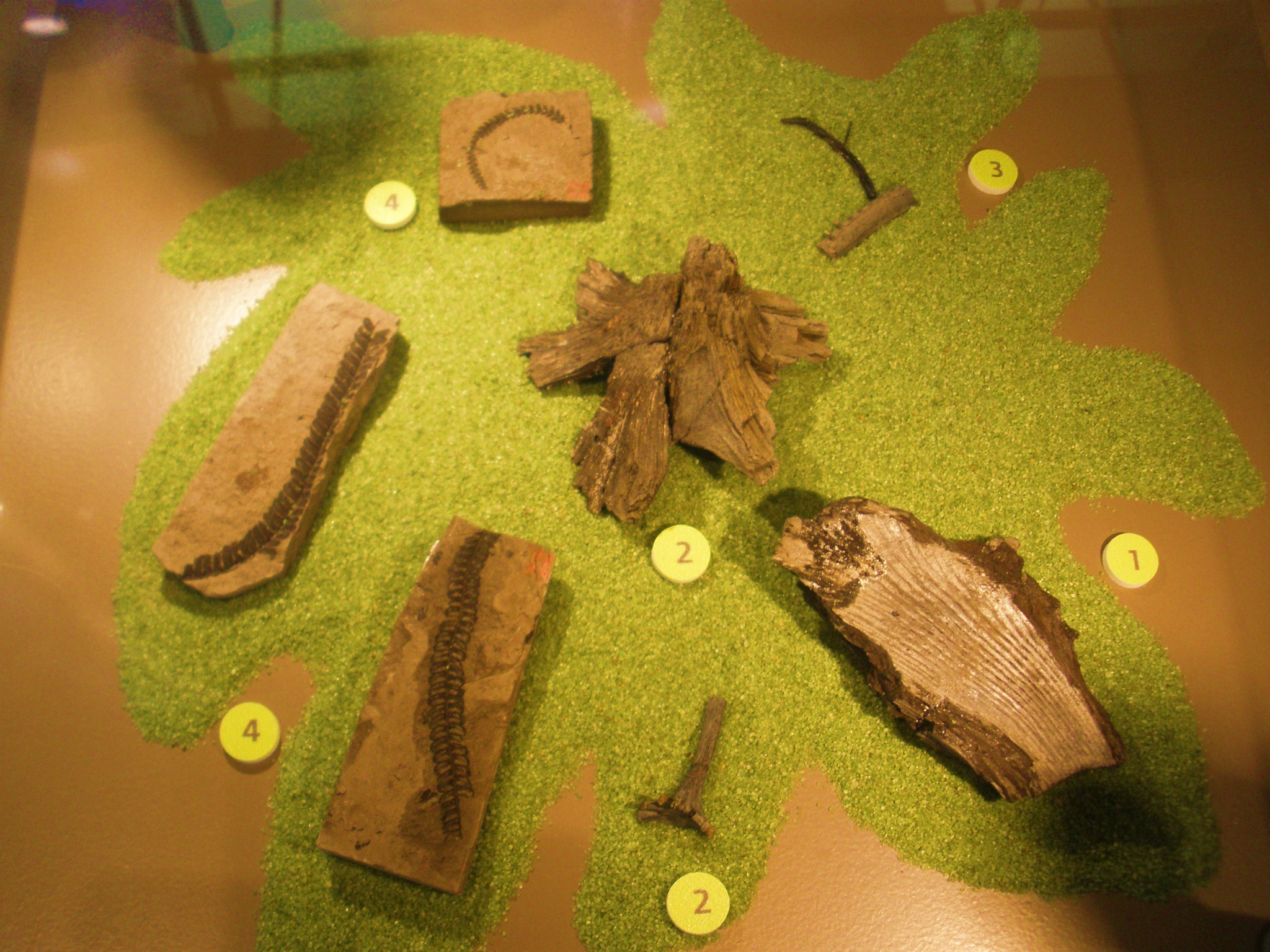
- W. reticulata fossils, Musee d'Histoire Naturelle, Brussels

Scientific classification
- Kingdom: Plantae
- Clade: Tracheophytes
- Division: Polypodiophyta
- Class: Polypodiopsida
- Order: Gleicheniales
- Family: Matoniaceae
- Genus: †Weichselia; Stiehler

Species
- Weichselia reticulata

= Weichselia =

Weichselia Temporal range: Mid Jurassic-early Late Cretaceous Bathonian–Cenomanian

Extinct genus of ferns

Weichselia is an extinct genus of fern. They were abundant from the Middle Jurassic to Early Cretaceous. While generally supposed to have affinities to Matoniaceae, some research has suggested that they have closer affinites to the Marattiales, though its morphology is strongly divergent from both of these groups. They are thought to have grown similar to modern tree ferns, with an upright stem topped with a crown of fronds. The genus filled multiple ecological niches, such as being the primary mangrove tree for millions of years.

== Evolutionary history ==
The genus first appeared in the Middle Jurassic with remains found in North Africa and Georgia. During the Early-mid Cretaceous, the genus had a wide distribution, having been found in Europe, East Asia, the Indian subcontinent, North Africa, southern North America and northern South America. The youngest remains of the genus are known from the early Late Cretaceous (Cenomanian) of Europe and North Africa. Remains are found in both continental and marginal marine deposits.

== Ecology ==
Weichselia has been interpreted as being xeromorphic, and has been suggested that they grew in savannah and/or coastal environments. It has also been proposed that they were primary colonisers following the destruction of pre-existing vegetation, particularly after wildfires. Others have indicated that the growth strategies of Weichselia are more consistent with fire tolerance, with the plant re-sprouting from buds in their trunks after a fire. Weichselia seems to have encountered wildfires on a regular basis, as charred pieces of the plant were the most frequently sampled remains in a study of 3338 Weichselia fragments from 25 different Early Cretaceous fossil sites.

Weichselia fossils have been recovered from both freshwater and brackish environments including rivers, lakes, lagoons, estuaries, deltas, and marshes. Some notable Weichselia-bearing deposits include the Sainte-Barbe Clays Formation and Bahariya Formation, which have also yielded historically significant Iguanodon and Spinosaurus specimens respectively.

It has been estimated that Weichselia could have grown to heights of around 8.57 meters (28.1 feet), and would have sexually reproduced via spores as seen in other ferns. The spores were located in double rows of sori along fertile fronds, however the rarity of these fronds in the fossil record has led some to suggest that the plant may have dominantly reproduced via asexual vegetative reproduction instead.
