= NaturBornholm =

Natural history museum in Denmark

Coordinates: 55.0641°N 14.9174°E

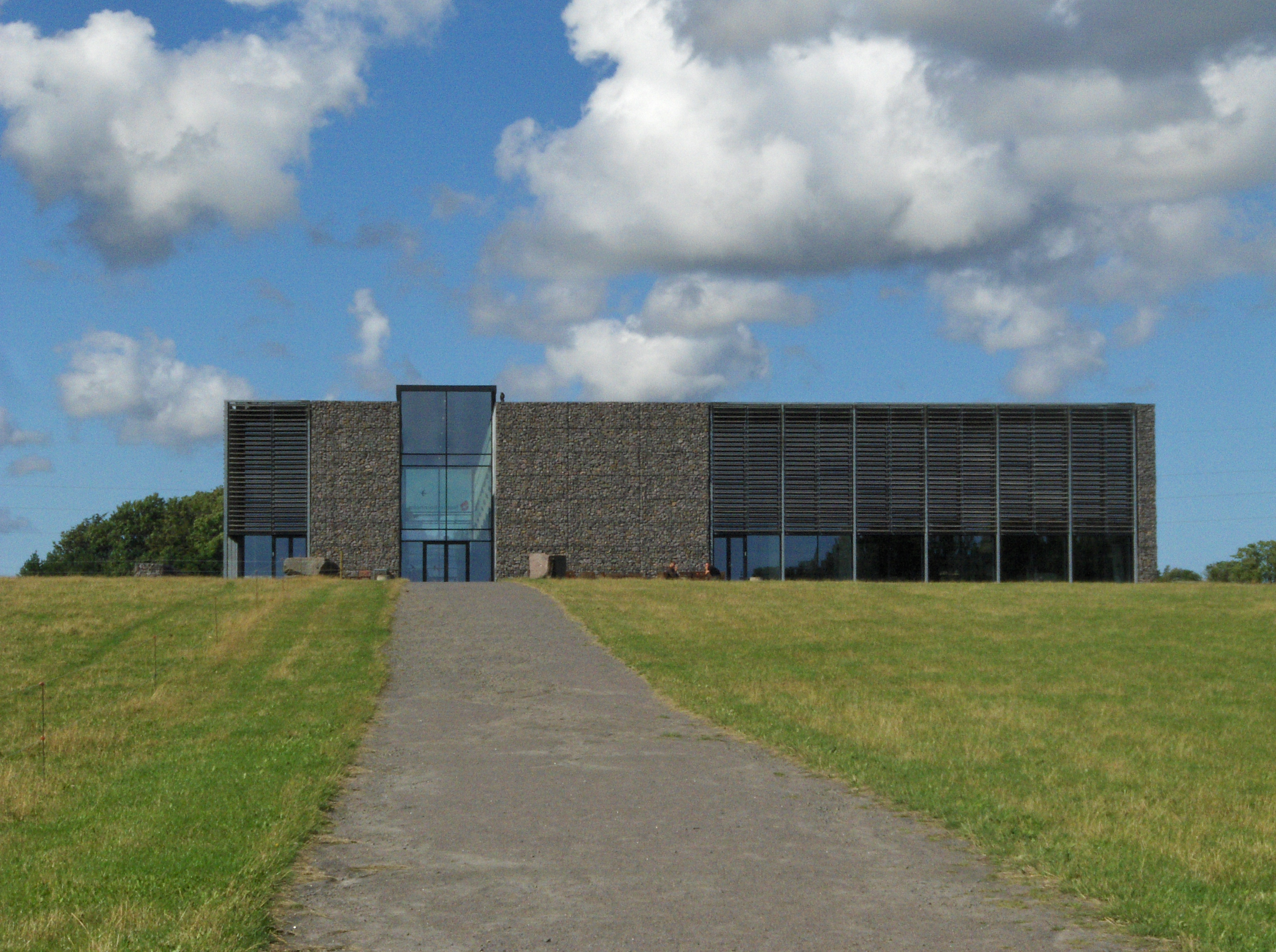
NaturBornholm seen from the south

NaturBornholm, located in Aakirkeby, is an interpretive centre and museum on the Danish island of Bornholm. It is dedicated to the geology and natural history of the island. It was inaugurated on 16 May 2000.

== Design ==
The museum was designed by Henning Larsen. The building employs gabions. This technique, though originating in engineering, was popularized by Herzog and de Meuron in their design of the Domus Winery in Napa Valley.

== See also ==
- GeoCenter Møns Klint
- Skagen Odde Nature Centre
