= Nybelinoides =

Scientific classification
- Kingdom: Animalia
- Phylum: Chordata
- Class: Actinopterygii
- Order: Osmeriformes
- Genus: †Nybelinoides; Taverne, 1982

Extinct genus of fishes

Nybelinoides is an extinct genus of prehistoric ray-finned fish from the Early Cretaceous.

== See also ==
- Prehistoric fish
- List of prehistoric bony fish
