= Bagå Formation =

Geological formation in Denmark dating to the Early and Late Jurassic

- Stratigraphic range: Aalenian-Bathonian; ~175–165 Ma
- Type: Geological Formation
- Underlies: Rabekke Formation
- Overlies: Sorthat Formation

Lithology
- Primary: Claystone
- Other: Sandstone, coal

Location
- Coordinates: 55.2°N 15.0°E
- Approximate paleocoordinates: 45.8°N 21.8°E
- Region: Bornholm
- Country: Denmark
- Bagå Formation (Denmark)

The Bagå Formation is a geological formation dating to around 176 to 170 million years ago, in the Early and Late Jurassic. It is located on the island of Bornholm, Denmark.

== Fossil content ==
=== Ichnofossils ===
==== Sauropoda ====
Genus	Species	Location	Material	Notes	Images
Sauropodina indet.	unknown	Bornholm, Denmark	Footprints	The footprints were made by an unknown sauropod	

==== Ornithischians ====
Genus	Species	Location	Material	Notes	Images
Ornithischipida indet.	unknown	Bornholm, Denmark	Footprints	The footprints were made by an unidentified Thyreophoran	Cast of an inverted thyreophoran track from Bornholm in Copenhagen

== See also ==
- List of fossiliferous stratigraphic units in Denmark
- Drzewica Formation
