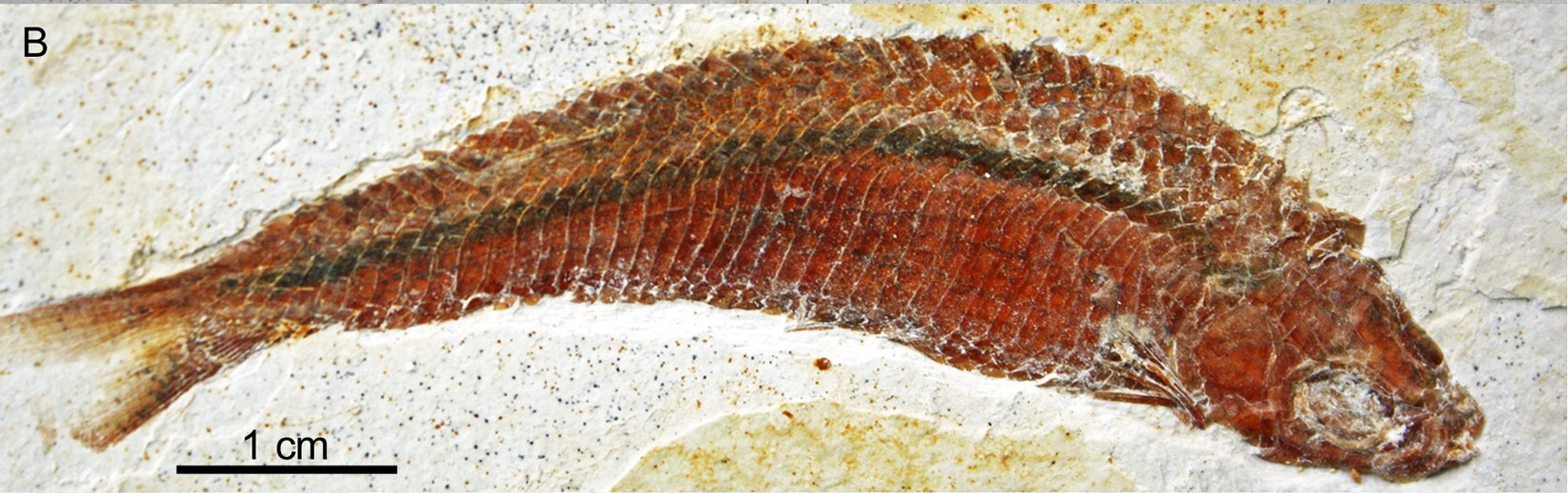
- Fossil of Pleuropholis sp.

Scientific classification
- Domain: Eukaryota
- Kingdom: Animalia
- Phylum: Chordata
- Class: Actinopterygii
- Division: Teleostei
- Family: †Pleuropholidae; Saint-Seine, 1949

= Pleuropholidae =

Pleuropholidae Temporal range: Middle Jurassic–Early Cretaceous

Extinct family of ray-finned fishes

Pleuropholidae is an extinct family of stem-teleost fish that lived from the Middle Jurassic to the Early Cretaceous. It is one of several families that were historically placed in the paraphyletic order Pholidophoriformes. Pleuropholids can be distinguished from other "pholidophoriforms" by the elongated scales on the sides of their bodies.

== Taxonomy ==
The family has five genera:

- Austropleuropholis
- Gondwanapleuropholis
- Parapleuropholis
- Pleuropholis
- Zurupleuropholis
