= Læså Formation =

Geologic formation in Denmark

- Stratigraphic range: Lower Cambrian
- Type: Geological formation
- Sub-units: Broens Odde Member, Rispebjerg Member
- Overlies: Hardeberga Formation
- Thickness: approx. 103 metres (340 ft)

Location
- Region: Bornholm
- Country: Denmark

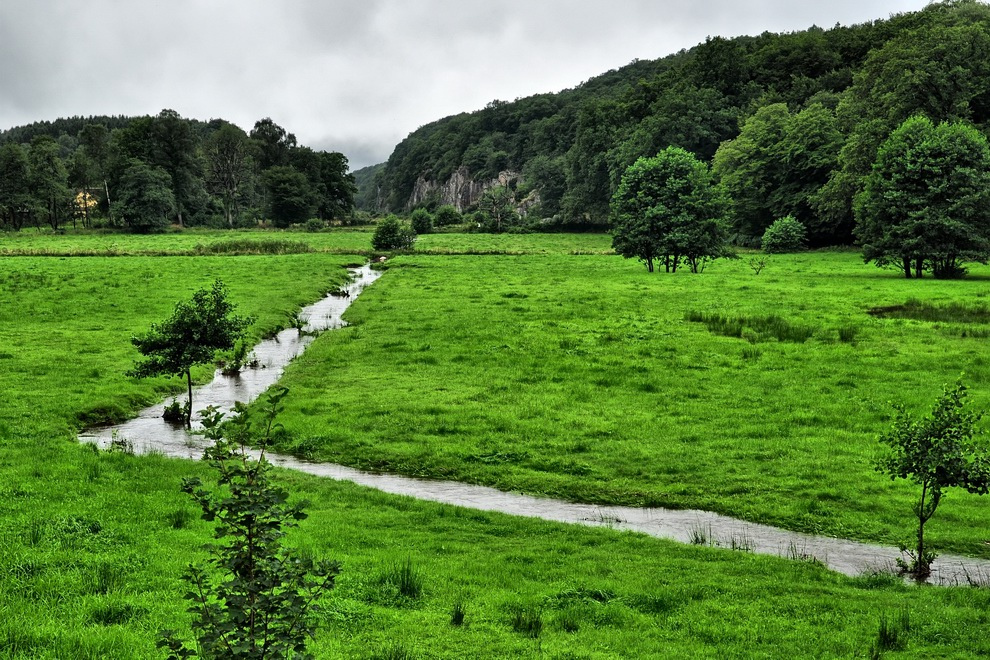
Læså running through the meadow in the bottom of Ekkodalen on the island of Bornholm, Denmark

The Læså Formation is a lower Cambrian unit exposed on the Baltic island Bornholm, comprising two members: the lower, the Broens Odde Member, colloquially and previously informally termed "green shales" (Grønne Skifre), a 100 m thick glauconitic silt-sandstone occasionally bearing extremely acritarch-rich phosphatic pebbles; gradually transitioning upwards into the upper, the 3 m thick Rispebjerg Member, a sandstone.
