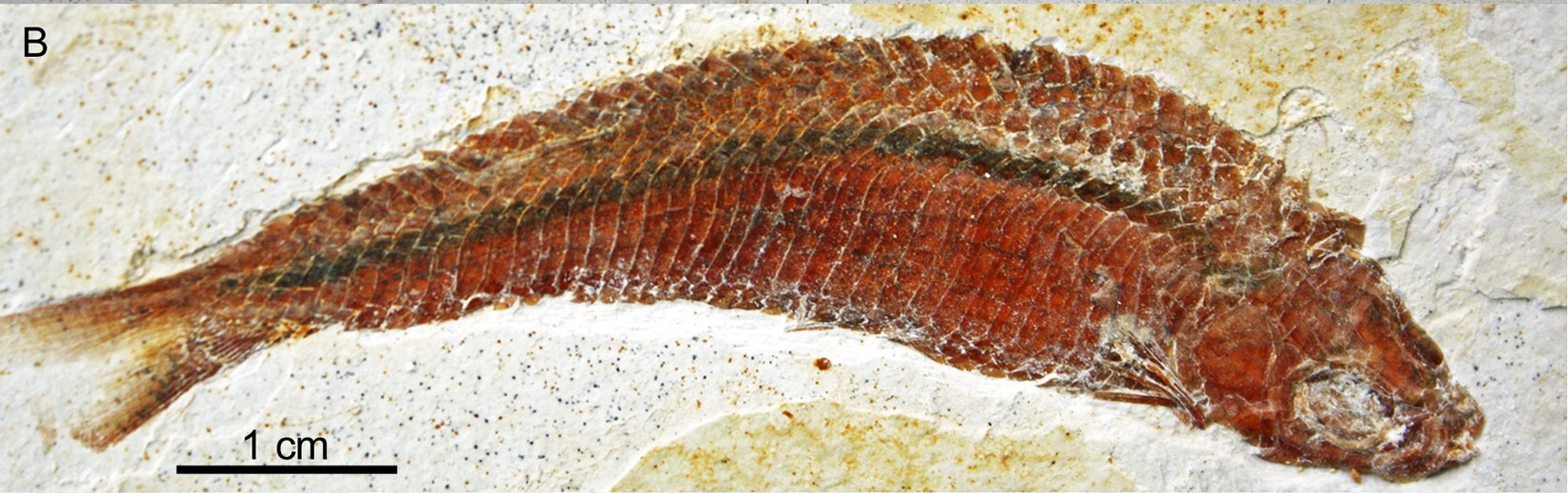
- Pleuropholis sp.

Scientific classification
- Kingdom: Animalia
- Phylum: Chordata
- Class: Actinopterygii
- Family: †Pleuropholidae
- Genus: †Pleuropholis; Egerton, 1858

Species
- †P. cisnerosorum Alvarado-Ortega & Brito, 2016; †P. crassicauda Egerton, 1858 (type); †P. danielae Brito & Vullo, 2023; †P. formosa Woodward, 1919; †P. longicaudata Egerton, 1858; †P. serrata Egerton, 1858; †P. thiollieri Sauvage, 1883

= Pleuropholis =

Pleuropholis Temporal range: Late Jurassic–Late Cretaceous, 155.7–Cenomanian Ma

Extinct genus of ray-finned fishes

Pleuropholis is an extinct genus of prehistoric ray-finned fish.

== See also ==
- List of prehistoric bony fish genera
