= 2023 in paleoichthyology =

This list of fossil fish research presented in 2023 is a list of new fossil taxa of jawless vertebrates, placoderms, cartilaginous fishes, bony fishes, and other fishes that were described during the year, as well as other significant discoveries and events related to paleoichthyology that occurred in 2023.

== Jawless vertebrates ==
Name	Novelty	Status	Authors	Age	Type locality	Location	Notes	Images
Amaltheolepis terranovi	Sp. nov	Valid	Blom et al.	Devonian (Emsian)	Shevchenkinskaya Formation	Russia (Arkhangelsk Oblast)	A member of Thelodonti belonging to the group Thelodontiformes and the family Turiniidae.	
Caeruleum	Gen. et sp. nov		Huang	Early Cretaceous	Jiufotang Formation	China	A lamprey. The type species is C. miraculum.	
Dayongaspis colubra	Sp. nov	Valid	Zhang et al.	Silurian (Telychian)	Xiushan Formation	China	A member of Galeaspida belonging to the family Dayongaspidae.	
Foxaspis	Gen. et sp. nov		Gai et al.	Devonian (Pragian)	Xiaoshan Formation	China (Guangxi)	A member of Galeaspida belonging to the group Polybranchiaspidiformes and the family Duyunolepididae. The type species is F. novemura.	
Jiangxialepis rongi	Sp. nov		Liu et al.	Silurian (Telychian)	Tataertag Formation	China	A member of Galeaspida belonging to the family Shuyuidae.	
Squirmarius	Gen. et sp. nov	Valid	McCoy et al.	Carboniferous (Pennsylvanian)	Mazon Creek fossil beds	United States (Illinois)	A member of Cyclostomi. The type species is S. testai.	
Xiyuichthys	Nom. et sp. nov		Shan et al.	Silurian	Tataertag Formation	China	A member of Galeaspida belonging to the family Xiushuiaspidae; a replacement name for Xiyuaspis Liu et al. (2019). Shan et al. (2023) also named a new species X. lixiensis from the Telychian Qingshui Formation (Jiangxi, China).	
Yanliaomyzon	Gen. 2 sp. nov		Wu, Janvier & Zhang	Jurassic (Callovian and Oxfordian)	Tiaojishan Formation	China	A lamprey. The type species is Y. occisor; genus also includes Y. ingensdentes.	

=== Jawless vertebrate research ===
- A study on the anatomy and affinities of Lasanius is published by Reeves et al. (2023), who interpret this vertebrate as a stem-cyclostome.
- Dearden et al. (2023) describe the cranial anatomy of Eriptychius americanus, provide evidence of the presence of a symmetrical set of cartilages interpreted as the preorbital neurocranium, and report that the studied cartilages filled out the head and closely supported the dermal skeleton (in that they were closer to the cranial anatomy of osteostracans and galeaspids than cyclostomes), but were not fused into a single unit around the brain (more closely resembling the cranial anatomy of cyclostomes than osteostracans, galeaspids and jawed vertebrates in that aspect).
- A study on the interaction of fluid flow with 2D models of heterostracan oral plate denticles is published by Grohganz et al. (2023), who interpret their findings as indicating that the studied denticles were not an adaptation to suspension feeding.

== Placoderms ==
Name	Novelty	Status	Authors	Age	Type locality	Location	Notes	Images
Bothriolepis dairbhrensis	Sp. nov	Valid	Dupret et al.	Devonian (Givetian)	Valentia Slate Formation	Ireland		
Chahuaqingolepis	Gen. et sp. nov	Valid	Liu et al.	Devonian	Tanglishu Formation	China	A member of the family Bothriolepididae. The type species is C. magniporus.	
Dunkleosteus tuderensis	Sp. nov		Lebedev in Lebedev et al.	Devonian (Famennian)	Bilovo Formation	Russia (Tver Oblast)		
Sherbonaspis talimaae	Sp. nov	Valid	Plax & Lukševičs	Devonian (probably Emsian)	Lepel Beds	Belarus	A member of Asterolepidoidei belonging to the family Pterichthyodidae.	
Valentinaspis	Gen. et sp. nov	Valid	Plax & Newman	Devonian (Emsian)		Belarus; Estonia	A member of the family Arctolepididae. The type species is V. profundus.	

=== Placoderm research ===
- Evidence from the study of the skull of Kolymaspis sibirica, interpreted as indicating that the sixth branchial arch was probably the one that was incorporated into the vertebrate shoulder girdle, is presented by Brazeau et al. (2023).
- Brazeau et al. (2023) describe a near-complete "acanthothoracid" upper jaw from the Devonian (Pragian) Yamaat Gol locality (Mongolia), and interpret this finding as indicating that the morphology and function of "acanthoracid" jaws resemble generalized "placoderm" conditions seen also in arthrodires and rhenanids.
- Redescription and a study on the affinities of Bothriolepis sinensis is published by Luo et al. (2023).
- Evidence of different patterns of phylogenetic and taxic diversity of Arthrodira throughout their evolutionary history is presented by Xue et al. (2023), who find evidence robust correlation between declines of phylogenetic diversity and significant global events during the Devonian, especially the late Givetian event, the Late Devonian extinction and the Hangenberg event.
- Engelman (2023) attempts to determine body size of Dunkleosteus terrelli, recovering the body lengths of between 3.1 and 3.5 m for typical adults and ~4.1 m for the largest individuals; in a subsequent study the author reevaluates the methodology and length estimates used by Ferrón, Martinez-Perez & Botella (2017), and argues that length estimates for Dunkleosteus based on the mouth dimensions of extant sharks are not reliable, as arthrodires have proportionally larger mouths than sharks.
- Cui et al. (2023) describe a near-complete post-thoracic exoskeleton of Entelognathus primordialis from the Silurian Kuanti Formation (China), reporting the presence of an anal fin spine in the studied specimen, previously known only in stem cartilaginous fishes, as well as striking similarities of the scales and squamation of the studied specimen to those of bony fishes, including the presence of rhomboid scales with the peg-and-socket articulation previously considered a synapomorphy of bony fishes.

== Cartilaginous fishes ==
Name	Novelty	Status	Authors	Age	Type locality	Location	Notes	Images
Atlantobatis	Gen. et sp. nov		Guinot et al.	Late Cretaceous		Senegal	A batomorph elasmobranch. The type species is A. acrodonta.	
Cavusodus	Gen. et sp. nov	Valid	Itano	Carboniferous (late Viséan–early Serpukhovian)		United States (Alabama)	A member of Petalodontiformes belonging to the family Janassidae. The type species is C. whitei.	
Corysodon multicristatus	Sp. nov	Valid	Batchelor & Duffin	Early Cretaceous (Aptian)	Atherfield Clay Formation	United Kingdom	A neoselachian shark. Possibly a Carcharhiniforme.	
Coupatezia casei	Sp. nov		Guinot et al.	Late Cretaceous		Senegal	A batomorph elasmobranch.	
Crioselache	Gen. et sp. nov	Valid	Pauliv et al.	Permian (Asselian)	Campo Mourão Formation	Brazil	Possibly a member of the family Symmoriidae. The type species is C. wittigi.	
'Dasyatis' reticulata	Sp. nov		Guinot et al.	Late Cretaceous		Senegal	A batomorph elasmobranch.	
Dasyomyliobatis	Gen. et sp. nov	Valid	Marramà et al.	Eocene (Ypresian)	Monte Bolca Lagerstätte	Italy	A member of Myliobatiformes belonging to the new family Dasyomyliobatidae. The type species is D. thomyorkei.	
Denaea patula	Sp. nov		Ivanov in Ivanov, Alekseev & Nikolaeva	Carboniferous (Viséan)		Russia	A member of Symmoriiformes.	
Desinia	Gen. et sp. nov	Valid	Ivanov in Ivanov et al.	Permian		Russia (Kirov Oblast; Komi Republic; Mari El; Tatarstan)	A member of the family Sphenacanthidae. The type species is D. radiata. Published online in 2023, but the issue date is listed as December 2022.	
Fairchildodus	Gen. et sp. nov		Chahud	Permian (Cisuralian)	Irati Formation	Brazil	A member of Holocephali. The type species is F. rioclarensis.	
Funicristata	Gen. et sp. nov	Valid	Burrow in Burrow, Murphy & Turner	Silurian (Přidolí)	Roberts Mountains Formation	United States (Nevada)	An acanthodian of uncertain affinities. The type species is F. nevadaensis.	
Hemipristis tanakai	Sp. nov		Tomita, Yabumoto & Kuga	Oligocene	Yamaga Formation	Japan	A species of Hemipristis.	
Karpinskiprion	Gen. et comb. nov	Valid	Lebedev & Itano in Lebedev et al.	Carboniferous		Russia (Moscow Oblast; Volgograd Oblast)	A member of the family Helicoprionidae. The type species is "Helicoprion" ivanovi Karpinsky (1924).	
Lissodus tumidoclavus	Sp. nov	Valid	Duffin, Heckert & Hancox	Early Triassic	Burgersdorp Formation	South Africa	A member of Hybodontoidea.	
Luopingselache	Gen. et sp. nov		Wen et al.	Middle Triassic (Anisian)		China	A member of the family Lonchidiidae. Genus includes new species L. striata.	
Maghriboselache	Gen. et sp. nov		Klug et al.	Late Devonian		Morocco	A member of the family Cladoselachidae. The type species is M. mohamezanei.	
Orcadacanthus	Gen. et comb. nov	Valid	Newman et al.	Devonian	Orcadian Basin	United Kingdom	A member of Acanthodiformes belonging to the family Mesacanthidae. The type species is "Acanthodes" pusillus Agassiz (1844).	
Phosphatodon cretaceus	Sp. nov		Guinot et al.	Late Cretaceous		Senegal	A batomorph elasmobranch.	
Physogaleus onkensis	Sp. nov		Boulemia & Adnet	Paleogene	Kef Esnoun Formation	Algeria		
Ptychotrygon ameghinorum	Sp. nov		Begat et al.	Late Cretaceous (Cenomanian)	Mata Amarilla Formation	Argentina		
Ptychotrygon nazeensis	Sp. nov		Guinot et al.	Late Cretaceous		Senegal	A batomorph elasmobranch.	
'Rhinobatos' popenguinensis	Sp. nov		Guinot et al.	Late Cretaceous		Senegal	A batomorph elasmobranch.	
Sowibatos	Gen. et sp. nov		Guinot et al.	Late Cretaceous		Senegal	A batomorph elasmobranch. The type species is S. minimus.	
Squatinactis multicuspidatus	Sp. nov		Ivanov in Ivanov, Alekseev & Nikolaeva	Carboniferous (Viséan)		Russia		
Strigilodus	Gen. et sp. nov	Valid	Hodnett et al.	Carboniferous (Viséan)	Ste. Genevieve Formation	United States (Kentucky)	A member of Petalodontiformes belonging to the family Janassidae. The type species is S. tollesonae.	
Strophodus atlasensis	Sp. nov	Valid	Stumpf et al.	Middle Jurassic (Bajocian)	Agoudim Formation	Morocco	A member of Hybodontiformes belonging to the family Hybodontidae and the subfamily Acrodontinae.	
Sulcacanthus	Gen. et sp. nov	Valid	Itano & Duffin	Carboniferous (Viséan)	St. Louis Formation	United States (Indiana)	A chimaera belonging to the group Squalorajoidei. The type species is S. schachti.	
Terangabatis	Gen. et sp. nov		Guinot et al.	Late Cretaceous		Senegal	A batomorph elasmobranch. The type species is T. thiami.	

=== Cartilaginous fish research ===
- Fossil material of members of the genera Pucapampella and Zamponiopteron is described from the Devonian (Eifelian) Chagrapi Formation by Zevallos-Valdivia et al. (2023), representing the first record of Paleozoic vertebrates from Peru reported to date.
- Burrow & Desbiens (2023) describe dental elements of Doliodus latispinosus from the Devonian York River Formation (Quebec, Canada), finding no justification for assigning the studied isolated dental elements to a species distinct from D. latispinosus from the Atholville beds (New Brunswick, Canada).
- A study on the musculoskeletal anatomy of Iniopera is published by Dearden, Herrel & Pradel (2023), who interpret the anatomy of Iniopera as unsuited to durophagy, and consider it to be likely a high-performance suction-feeder.
- Fossil material of members of at least seven species belonging to the genus Ptychodus is described from the ?Cenomanian–Santonian of the Malyy Prolom area (Ryazan Oblast, Russia) by Amadori et al. (2023), who also report the northernmost occurrence of Ptychodus in Europe from the Cenomanian of Varavinsky ravine area (Moscow Oblast, Russia), and interpret the studied fossils as indicating that Late Cretaceous epicontinental seas of the Russian platform were important areas of diversification and spread of Ptychodus.
- Amadori et al. (2023) report the discovery of teeth of various species belonging to the genus Ptychodus from the Cenomanian and Turonian deposits of Ukraine, including teeth of cuspidate (P. altior) and un-cuspidate species (P. decurrens, P. latissimus, P. marginalis and P. polygyrus), and argue that the availability of diverse shelled invertebrates in epicontinental seas might have favored the diversification of Ptychodus.
- Ghosh et al. (2023) report the discovery of a new assemblage of lamniform shark teeth from the Aptian Habur Formation (India), including teeth of Dwardius and possibly of Eostriatolamia which may be some of the globally oldest record of these taxa.
- A study on the teeth of Megachasma applegatei is published by Krak & Shimada (2023), who find that the range of the morphometric variation of teeth of M. applegatei is larger than that of teeth of extant megamouth shark, with different tooth types corresponding to tooth types present in the smalltooth sand tiger.
- Shimada et al. (2023) describe tessellated calcified cartilage and placoid scale associated with a tooth set of Otodus megalodon from the Miocene strata in Japan, and interpret the morphology of the studied material as indicating that O. megalodon was generally a slow cruising shark.
- A study on the thermoregulation in Otodus megalodon is published by Griffiths et al. (2023), who argue that O. megalodon had an overall warmer body temperature compared with other coexisting shark species, and that its large body size coupled with high metabolic costs associated with having at least partial endothermy might have made it vulnerable to extinction.
- Collareta, Casati & Di Cencio (2023) describe new fossil material of Parotodus benedenii from the Valdelsa Basin (Italy), providing evidence of the survival of the species at least until the Late Pliocene, and interpret P. benedenii as a large-bodied carnivorous shark living in pelagic settings.
- Collareta et al. (2023) report the discovery of teeth of Alopias grandis from the Miocene deposits in southern Italy, possibly including the geologically youngest record of the species and extending its known geographic range.
- Villafaña et al. (2023) describe fossil material of the common thresher and the porbeagle from the Bahía Inglesa Formation (Caldera Basin, Chile), confirming the abundance of lamniform sharks in the Eastern Pacific of South America during the Neogene.
- Ehret et al. (2023) provisionally refer the species Cosmopolitodus planus/Isurus planus to the genus Carcharodon, and describe fossil material of C. planus and Carcharodon hubbelli from Miocene deposits in the South Island, representing the first records of both species from New Zealand reported to date.
- A study on the anatomy and affinities of Protospinax annectans, based on data from both known and previously undescribed specimens from the Tithonian Altmühltal Formation (Germany), is published by Jambura et al. (2023).
- Ferrón (2023) argues that, although representatives of most squalomorph groups colonized deep waters independently during the Late Jurassic and Early Cretaceous, bioluminescence evolved only once among sharks in a bathydemersal ancestor.
- A fossil egg case containing a well-preserved batoid (possibly stem-myliobatiform) embryo, with a unique combination of characters indicating that the embryo represents a previously unknown batoid form, is described from the Cenomanian Sannine limestone of Hjoula (Lebanon) by Capasso & Yamaguchi (2023).
- Reinecke et al. (2023) study the anatomy and affinities of whiptail stingray teeth from the Chattian of northern Germany and the Burdigalian of southern France, transferring the species Dasyatis probsti to the genus Bathytoshia.
- Pollerspöck et al. (2023) describe an assemblage of deep-sea shark fossils from the Eocene (Ypresian) Lillebælt Clay Formation (Denmark), showing highest similarities with deep-sea shark faunas of France, Austria and northern Morocco in spite of the North Sea Basin having lost direct connections to the neighbouring marine areas in the Eocene.
- Kovalchuk et al. (2023) revise the taxonomic composition of the cartilaginous fish assemblage from the Eocene (Lutetian-Bartonian) Kyiv Formation (Ukraine), interpreting the studied taxa as inhabiting shallow, warm waters and confined to the continental shelf.
- Verma (2023) describes new fossil material of elasmobranchs from the Eocene (Bartonian) Harudi Formation (India), providing evidence of replacement of earlier Eocene assemblages of elasmobranchs from western India by an assemblage dominated by members of the genera Brachycarcharias, Striatolamia, Galeocerdo and Carcharhinus, which might have been linked to the Middle Eocene Climatic Optimum.
- An assemblage of shark and ray teeth, interpreted as indicative of a warm, shallow water community, is described from the Lower Miocene deposits of the Upper Marine Molasse near Ballendorf (Germany) by Höltke et al. (2023).
- A study on changes of diversity of European chondrichthyans during the Neogene is published by Villafaña et al. (2023).
- A study on the impact of the Cretaceous–Paleogene extinction event on elasmobranchs is published by Guinot & Condamine (2023), who find rays and durophagous species to be more affected by the extinction than sharks and nondurophagous species, and find taxa with large geographic ranges or restricted to high-latitude settings to show higher survival.

== Ray-finned fishes ==
Name	Novelty	Status	Authors	Age	Type locality	Location	Notes	Images
Amelangia	Gen. et sp. nov	Valid	Štamberg & Werneburg	Permian (Asselian)	Lower Goldlauter Formation	Germany	A member of the family Aeduellidae. The type species is A. ornata.	
Archaeus solus	Sp. nov	Valid	Bannikov & Erebakan	Oligocene		Russia (Krasnodar Krai)	A member of the family Carangidae.	
Armigatus plinii	Sp. nov	Valid	Marramà & Carnevale	Early Cretaceous (Albian)	Pietraroja Plattenkalk	Italy	A member of Clupeomorpha belonging to the group Ellimmichthyiformes and the family Armigatidae.	
Bolcaperca	Gen. et sp. nov	Valid	Bannikov & Zorzin	Eocene (Ypresian)	Monte Bolca	Italy	A member of Percoidei of uncertain affinities. The type species is B. craccorum.	
Boreiosturion	Gen. et sp. nov		Murray, Nelson & Brinkman	Late Cretaceous (Campanian)	Horseshoe Canyon Formation	Canada (Alberta)	A sturgeon. The type species is B. labyrinthicus.	
Butyrumichthys	Gen. et sp. nov		Schrøder et al.	Eocene	Fur Formation	Denmark	A stromateoiform, possibly a medusafish. The type species is B. henricii.	
Cladocynodon	Gen. et sp. nov	Valid	De Mayrinck et al.	Early Cretaceous (Aptian)	Barbalha Formation	Brazil	A member of the family Cladocyclidae. The type species is C. araripensis.	
Dercetis magnificus	Sp. nov		Chida, Brinkman & Murray	Late Cretaceous (Campanian)	Bearpaw Formation	Canada (Alberta)	A member of the family Dercetidae.	
Diandongichthys	Gen. et sp. nov		Xu & Ma	Middle Triassic (Anisian)	Guanling Formation	China	A basal member of Ginglymodi. The type species is D. ocellatus.	
Grandemarinus	Gen. et sp. nov		Cooper et al.	Late Cretaceous (Turonian)	Akrabou Formation	Morocco	A gar. The type species is G. gherisensis.	
Iridopristis	Gen. et sp. nov	Valid	Andrews et al.	Danian	Hornerstown Formation	United States (New Jersey)	A stem-lineage member of Holocentridae. The type species is I. parrisi.	
Khoratamia	Gen. et sp. nov	Valid	Deesri et al.	Early Cretaceous (Aptian)	Khok Kruat Formation	Thailand	A member of the family Amiidae belonging to the subfamily Sinamiinae. The type species is K. phattharajani.	
Kutaichthys	Gen et 2 sp. nov	Valid	Bakaev in Esin & Bakaev	Permian		Russia (Komi Republic; Perm Krai; Samara Oblast)	An early ray-finned fish belonging to the group Palaeonisciformes and the family Palaeoniscidae. The type species is K. gubini Esin & Bakaev; genus also includes K. dozmerensis Esin & Bakaev. Published online in 2023, but the issue date is listed as December 2022.	
Macabi	Gen. et sp. nov	Valid	Recinos et al.	Late Cretaceous (Campanian)		Mexico	A bonefish. The type species is M. tojolabalensis.	
Minicholepis	Gen et sp. nov	Valid	Bulanov, Minikh & Golubev	Permian		Russia (Kirov Oblast)	A member of Eurynotoidiformes. The type species is M. primus. Published online in 2023, but the issue date is listed as December 2022.	
Nursallia fenestrata	Sp. nov	Valid	Capasso	Late Cretaceous (Turonian)	Akrabou Formation	Morocco	A member of Pycnodontiformes belonging to the family Pycnodontidae.	
Odontobutis hayashitokuei	Sp. nov	In press	Yabumoto & Zhang	Miocene	Chojabaru Formation	Japan	A species of Odontobutis.	
Paleocharacodon	Gen. et sp. nov	Valid	Caballero-Viñas, Alvarado-Ortega & Cantalice Severiano	Pliocene	Atotonilco El Grande Formation	Mexico	A member of the family Goodeidae belonging to the subfamily Goodeinae. The type species is P. guzmanae.	
Paraclupea pietrarojae	Sp. nov	Valid	Marramà & Carnevale	Early Cretaceous (Albian)	Pietraroja Plattenkalk	Italy	A member of Clupeomorpha belonging to the group Ellimmichthyiformes and the family Paraclupeidae.	
Parapsephurus	Gen. et sp. nov	Valid	Hilton et al.	Late Cretaceous (Maastrichtian)	Hell Creek Formation	United States (North Dakota)	A paddlefish. The type species is P. willybemisi.	
Phoebeannaia	Gen. et sp. nov	Valid	Caron et al.	Carboniferous (Bashkirian)	Marsden Formation	United Kingdom	An early ray-finned fish, possibly stem-neopterygian. The type species is P. mossae.	
Pleuropholis danielae	Sp. nov		Brito & Vullo	Late Cretaceous (Cenomanian)	Akrabou Formation	Morocco		
Pugiopsephurus	Gen. et sp. nov	Valid	Hilton et al.	Late Cretaceous (Maastrichtian)	Hell Creek Formation	United States (North Dakota)	A paddlefish. The type species is P. inundatus.	
Rhamphoichthys	Gen. et sp. nov	Valid	El Hossny et al.	Late Cretaceous (Cenomanian)	Hesseltal Formation	Germany; Italy; Lebanon; United Kingdom	A member of the family Plethodidae. The type species is R. taxidiotis. El Hossny et al. (2023) also interpret fossils of "Protosphyraena" minor and "Protosphyraena" stebbingi as fossil material of Rhamphoichthys sp., but don't consider these to be valid taxa due to the incompleteness of their fossil material.	
Rhamphosus bloti	Sp. nov	Valid	Calzoni et al.	Eocene (Ypresian)	Monte Bolca	Italy	A member of Syngnathiformes belonging to the group Dactylopteroidei and the family Rhamphosidae.	
Rhamphosus brevirostris	Sp. nov	Valid	Calzoni et al.	Eocene (Ypresian)	Monte Bolca	Italy	A member of Syngnathiformes belonging to the group Dactylopteroidei and the family Rhamphosidae.	
Rhamphosus longispinatus	Sp. nov	Valid	Calzoni et al.	Eocene (Ypresian)	Monte Bolca	Italy	A member of Syngnathiformes belonging to the group Dactylopteroidei and the family Rhamphosidae.	
Rhamphosus tubulirostris	Sp. nov	Valid	Calzoni et al.	Eocene (Ypresian)	Monte Bolca	Italy	A member of Syngnathiformes belonging to the group Dactylopteroidei and the family Rhamphosidae.	
Saurichthys taotie	Sp. nov	Valid	Fang et al.	Late Triassic (Carnian)	Xiaowa Formation	China	Announced in 2022; the final article version was published in 2023.	
Sciades maldonadonis	Sp. nov	Valid	Carrillo-Briceño et al.	Miocene	La Victoria Formation	Colombia	A species of Sciades.	
Serrivomer glehni	Sp. nov	Valid	Nazarkin	Miocene	Kurasi Formation	Russia (Sakhalin Oblast)	A species of Serrivomer.	
Stanhopella	Gen. et sp. nov	Valid	Capasso	Late Cretaceous (Cenomanian)	Sannine Formation	Lebanon	A member of Pycnodontiformes. The type species is S. elongata.	
Surlykus	Gen. et sp. nov	Valid	Schrøder & Carnevale	Eocene (Ypresian)	Fur Formation	Denmark	A member of Argentiniformes. The type is species S. longigracilis.	
Thorecichthys fideli	Sp. nov		Than-Marchese et al.	Late Cretaceous (Cenomanian)	Cintalapa Formation	Mexico	A member of Clupeomorpha belonging to the group Ellimmichthyiformes.	
Vango	Gen. et sp. nov.		Murray et al.	Late Cretaceous (Maastrichtian)	Mahajanga Basin	Madagascar	A member of the family Chanidae. The type species is V. fahiny.	
Vologdinia	Gen et comb. nov	Valid	Bulanov, Minikh & Golubev	Permian	Poldarsa/Poldarskaya Formation	Russia (Orenburg Oblast; Vologda Oblast)	A member of Eurynotoidiformes. The type species is "Isadia" opokiensis Minikh & Andrushkevich (2017). Published online in 2023, but the issue date is listed as December 2022.	
Ypsiloichthys	Gen. et sp. nov	Valid	El Hossny & Cavin	Late Cretaceous (Cenomanian)	Sannine Formation	Lebanon	A teleost of uncertain affinities. The type species is Y. sibelleae.	
Zaiaichthys	Gen. et 2 sp. nov	Valid	Bannikov & Zorzin	Eocene (Ypresian)		Italy	A member of the family Monodactylidae. The type species is Z. postalensis; genus also includes Z. watersi.	

=== Otolith taxa ===
Name	Novelty	Status	Authors	Age	Type locality	Location	Notes	Images
Amblyeleotris robusta	Sp. nov	Valid	Bratishko & Schwarzhans in Bratishko, Schwarzhans & Vernyhorova	Miocene		Crimea	A species of Amblyeleotris.	
Archaeotolithus aptychoides	Sp. nov		Pindakiewicz, Hryniewicz & Kaim	Early Cretaceous (Valanginian)		Poland		
Arnoglossus kerichensis	Sp. nov	Valid	Bratishko & Schwarzhans in Bratishko, Schwarzhans & Vernyhorova	Miocene		Crimea	A scaldfish.	
Arnoglossus scitulus	Sp. nov	Valid	Bratishko & Schwarzhans in Bratishko, Schwarzhans & Vernyhorova	Miocene		Crimea	A scaldfish.	
Aseraggodes azovensis	Sp. nov	Valid	Bratishko & Schwarzhans in Bratishko, Schwarzhans & Vernyhorova	Miocene		Crimea	A species of Aseraggodes.	
Benthosema duanformis	Sp. nov		Lin in Lin et al.	Pliocene	Gutingkeng Formation	Taiwan	A species of Benthosema.	
Benthosema parafibulatum	Sp. nov		Lin in Lin et al.	Pliocene	Gutingkeng Formation	Taiwan	A species of Benthosema.	
Bothus isselburgensis	Sp. nov	Valid	Schwarzhans & von der Hocht	Miocene		Germany	A species of Bothus.	
Bregmaceros danicus	Sp. nov	Valid	Schwarzhans & Nielsen	Eocene	Lillebælt Clay Formation	Denmark	A codlet.	
Callionymus bessarabianus	Sp. nov	Valid	Bratishko & Schwarzhans in Bratishko, Schwarzhans & Vernyhorova	Miocene		Crimea	A species of Callionymus.	
Callionymus kalinus	Sp. nov	Valid	Bratishko & Schwarzhans in Bratishko, Schwarzhans & Vernyhorova	Miocene		Crimea	A species of Callionymus.	
Capros crudus	Sp. nov	Valid	Bratishko & Schwarzhans in Bratishko, Schwarzhans & Vernyhorova	Miocene		Crimea	A species of Capros.	
Caranx rharbensis	Sp. nov		Schwarzhans	Pliocene (Zanclean)		Morocco	A species of Caranx.	
Cataetyx alpersi	Sp. nov	Valid	Schwarzhans & von der Hocht	Miocene		Germany	A species of Cataetyx.	
Centroberyx vonderhochti	Sp. nov		Schwarzhans	Pliocene (Zanclean)		Morocco	A species of Centroberyx.	
Cepola lombartei	Sp. nov		Schwarzhans	Pliocene (Zanclean)		Morocco	A species of Cepola.	
Chelon jurkinensis	Sp. nov	Valid	Bratishko & Schwarzhans in Bratishko, Schwarzhans & Vernyhorova	Miocene		Crimea	A species of Chelon.	
Congiopodus? inopinatus	Sp. nov	Valid	Bratishko & Schwarzhans in Bratishko, Schwarzhans & Vernyhorova	Miocene		Crimea	Possibly a species of Congiopodus.	
Deltentosteus planus	Sp. nov		Schwarzhans	Pliocene (Zanclean)		Morocco	A species of Deltentosteus.	
Diaphus? duplex	Sp. nov	Valid	Schwarzhans & Nielsen	Eocene	Lillebælt Clay Formation	Denmark	Possibly a species of Diaphus.	
Diaphus maghrebensis	Sp. nov		Schwarzhans	Pliocene (Zanclean)		Morocco	A species of Diaphus.	
Dicologlossa postpatens	Sp. nov	Valid	Bratishko & Schwarzhans in Bratishko, Schwarzhans & Vernyhorova	Miocene		Crimea	A species of Dicologlossa.	
Galaxias crassus	Sp. nov	Valid	Schwarzhans et al.	Early Miocene	Bannockburn Formation	New Zealand	A species of Galaxias.	
Galaxias naviculus	Sp. nov	Valid	Schwarzhans et al.	Early Miocene	Bannockburn Formation	New Zealand	A species of Galaxias.	
Galaxias nitidus	Sp. nov	Valid	Schwarzhans et al.	Early Miocene	Bannockburn Formation	New Zealand	A species of Galaxias.	
Galaxias polei	Sp. nov	Valid	Schwarzhans et al.	Early Miocene	Bannockburn Formation	New Zealand	A species of Galaxias.	
Galaxias tholus	Sp. nov	Valid	Schwarzhans et al.	Early Miocene	Bannockburn Formation	New Zealand	A species of Galaxias.	
Globogobius	Gen. et 2 sp. nov	Valid	Bratishko & Schwarzhans in Bratishko, Schwarzhans & Vernyhorova	Miocene		Crimea	A goby belonging to the subfamily Gobiinae and to the Aphia lineage. The type species is G. globulosus; genus also includes G. depressus.	
Gutingichthys	Gen. et sp. nov		Lin in Lin et al.	Pliocene	Gutingkeng Formation	Taiwan	A viviparous brotula. The type species is G. changi.	
Hygophum kentnielseni	Sp. nov	Valid	Schwarzhans & von der Hocht	Miocene		Denmark	A species of Hygophum.	
Hyrcanogobius eccentricus	Sp. nov	Valid	Bratishko & Schwarzhans in Bratishko, Schwarzhans & Vernyhorova	Miocene		Crimea	A species of Hyrcanogobius.	
Kokenichthys kuteki	Sp. nov		Pindakiewicz, Hryniewicz & Kaim	Early Cretaceous (Valanginian)		Poland		
Maeotichthys	Gen. et comb. et sp. nov	Valid	Bratishko & Schwarzhans in Bratishko, Schwarzhans & Vernyhorova	Miocene		Azerbaijan Bulgaria; Crimea	A member of the family Clupeidae belonging to the subfamily Alosinae. The type species is "Otolithus (Osmeridarum)" wilhelmi Djafarova (2006); genus also includes "Clupea" gomotartziensis Strashimirov (1985), as well as new species Maeotichthys salebrosus Schwarzhans & Bratishko in Schwarzhans, Bratishko & Vernyhorova (2023).	
Mataichthys asymmetricus	Sp. nov	Valid	Schwarzhans et al.	Early Miocene	Bannockburn Formation	New Zealand	A species of Mataichthys.	
Mesogobius chersonesus	Sp. nov	Valid	Bratishko & Schwarzhans in Bratishko, Schwarzhans & Vernyhorova	Miocene		Crimea	A species of Mesogobius.	
Myripristis ouarredi	Sp. nov		Schwarzhans	Pliocene (Zanclean)		Morocco	A species of Myripristis.	
Neogobius ignotus	Sp. nov	Valid	Bratishko & Schwarzhans in Bratishko, Schwarzhans & Vernyhorova	Miocene		Crimea	A species of Neogobius.	
Neogobius uncinatus	Sp. nov	Valid	Bratishko & Schwarzhans in Bratishko, Schwarzhans & Vernyhorova	Miocene		Crimea	A species of Neogobius.	
Ophidion tuseti	Sp. nov		Schwarzhans	Pliocene (Zanclean)		Morocco	A species of Ophidion.	
Opsodentex mordax	Sp. nov		Schwarzhans	Pliocene (Zanclean)		Morocco	A member of the family Sparidae.	
Otarionichthys hofstedtae	Sp. nov	Valid	Schwarzhans & von der Hocht	Miocene		Denmark	A viviparous brotula.	
Palaeoargentina	Gen. et sp. nov		Pindakiewicz, Hryniewicz & Kaim	Early Cretaceous (Valanginian)		Poland	Genus includes new species P. plicata.	
Palaeogadus? belli	Sp. nov	Valid	Stringer & Sloan	Late Cretaceous (Maastrichtian)	Arkadelphia Marl	United States (Arkansas)	A member of the family Merlucciidae.	
Palimphemus cimmerius	Sp. nov	Valid	Bratishko & Schwarzhans in Bratishko, Schwarzhans & Vernyhorova	Miocene		Crimea	A member of the family Gadidae.	
Paramacroramphosus	Gen. et sp. et comb. nov	Valid	Bratishko & Schwarzhans in Bratishko, Schwarzhans & Vernyhorova	Miocene		Azerbaijan Crimea	A member of the family Macroramphosidae. The type species is P. pumilis; genus also includes "Оtolithus (inc. sedis)" platessaeformis Pobedina (1956).	
Parapristipoma bethensis	Sp. nov		Schwarzhans	Pliocene (Zanclean)		Morocco	A species of Parapristipoma.	
Parascolopsis septentrionalis	Sp. nov	Valid	Schwarzhans & von der Hocht	Miocene		Netherlands	A species of Parascolopsis.	
Paroxymetopon	Gen. et sp. nov	Valid	Bratishko & Schwarzhans in Bratishko, Schwarzhans & Vernyhorova	Miocene		Crimea	A dartfish. The type species is P. alienus.	
Pomadasys zemmourensis	Sp. nov		Schwarzhans	Pliocene (Zanclean)		Morocco	A species of Pomadasys.	
Pontogobius	Gen. et 3 sp. nov	Valid	Bratishko & Schwarzhans in Bratishko, Schwarzhans & Vernyhorova	Miocene		Crimea	A goby belonging to the subfamily Gobiinae and to the Benthophilus lineage. The type species is P. ahnelti; genus also includes P. trigonus and P. zonatus.	
Pronobythites	Gen. et sp. et comb. nov	Valid	Schwarzhans & Nielsen	Eocene	Lillebælt Clay Formation	Denmark France	A cusk-eel. The type species is P. schnetleri; genus also includes "Neobythites" bozzolo Lin, Nolf & Girone in Lin et al. (2016) and "Neobythites" leonardi Lin, Nolf & Girone in Lin et al. (2016).	
Protalbula pentangularis	Sp. nov		Pindakiewicz, Hryniewicz & Kaim	Early Cretaceous (Valanginian)		Poland		
Protoelops gracilis	Sp. nov		Pindakiewicz, Hryniewicz & Kaim	Early Cretaceous (Valanginian)		Poland		
Pteralbula polonica	Sp. nov		Pindakiewicz, Hryniewicz & Kaim	Early Cretaceous (Valanginian)		Poland		
Rhynchoconger carnevalei	Sp. nov		Schwarzhans	Miocene (Tortonian) and Pliocene (Zanclean)		Italy	A species of Rhynchoconger.	
Scomber qirimensis	Sp. nov	Valid	Bratishko & Schwarzhans in Bratishko, Schwarzhans & Vernyhorova	Miocene		Crimea	A species of Scomber.	
Scythogobius	Gen. et sp. nov	Valid	Schwarzhans & Bratishko in Schwarzhans, Bratishko & Vernyhorova	Miocene		Crimea	A member of the family Gobiidae belonging to the tribe Benthophilini. The type species is S. spissus.	
Spondyliosoma tingitana	Sp. nov		Schwarzhans	Pliocene (Zanclean)		Morocco	A species of Spondyliosoma.	
Trachinus maroccanus	Sp. nov		Schwarzhans	Pliocene (Zanclean)		Morocco	A species of Trachinus.	
Trachinus wernlii	Sp. nov		Schwarzhans	Pliocene (Zanclean)		Morocco	A species of Trachinus.	
Trachurus gramensis	Sp. nov	Valid	Schwarzhans & von der Hocht	Miocene		Denmark	A species of Trachurus.	
Trachurus insectus	Sp. nov		Schwarzhans	Pliocene (Zanclean)		Morocco	A species of Trachurus.	
Trachurus reineckei	Sp. nov	Valid	Hoedemakers in De Schutter et al.	Oligocene (Rupelian)	Boom Formation	Belgium	A species of Trachurus.	
Treldeichthys	Gen. et comb. nov	Valid	Schwarzhans & Nielsen	Eocene	Lillebælt Clay Formation	Denmark	A member of Acanthopterygii of uncertain affinities. The type species is "Caproidarum" madseni Schwarzhans (2007).	
Uranoscopus hoedemakersi	Sp. nov		Schwarzhans	Pliocene (Zanclean)		Morocco	A species of Uranoscopus.	
Uranoscopus vanhinsberghi	Sp. nov		Schwarzhans	Pliocene (Zanclean)		Morocco	A species of Uranoscopus.	
Zosterisessor pontikapaionensis	Sp. nov	Valid	Bratishko & Schwarzhans in Bratishko, Schwarzhans & Vernyhorova	Miocene		Crimea	A species of Zosterisessor.	

=== Ray-finned fish research ===
- Figueroa et al. (2023) report brain and cranial nerve soft-tissue preservation in the type specimen of Coccocephalus wildi from the Carboniferous strata in the Mountain Fourfoot Mine (Pennine Lower Coal Measures; Lancashire, United Kingdom).
- Bakaev, Johanson & LeBlanc (2023) study the dental system of Kazanichthys viatkensis, reporting the presence of morphological similarities to the dental systems of extant sparids, and interpreting K. viatkensis as a generalist durophagous feeder.
- Revision of the fossil material of Permian ray-finned fishes from the Kazankovo-Markino Formation (Kemerovo Oblast, Russia) is published by Bakaev (2023), who considers Heterolepis Sergienko (1974) to be a junior synonym of Eurynotoides Berg (1940).
- Martill (2023) describes a bony scute of a sturgeon from the Maastrichtian marine phosphatites of central Morocco, representing the first record of an acipenseriform fish from Africa reported to date.
- New information on the morphology of the scales of members of the family Pseudobeaconiidae, based on new fossil material from the Triassic Santa Clara Abajo Formation (Argentina), is presented by Giordano, Benavente & Suárez (2023).
- Putative eugnathid amiiform Sinoeugnathus kueichowensis is reinterpreted as a small-sized member of Ionoscopiformes by Feng et al. (2023), who name a new family Subortichthyidae including the genera Subortichthys, Sinoeugnathus, Allolepidotus and Eoeugnathus.
- Sullivan, Jasinski & Williamson (2023) describe an exceptionally well-preserved articulated skull roof and braincase of Melvius chauliodous from the Upper Cretaceous Kirtland Formation (New Mexico, United States), revise the characters that defin the genus and its two recognized species, and study the phylogenetic affinities of Melvius.
- A study on the microstructure of teeth of Late Jurassic pachycormids and caturoids from the Owadów-Brzezinki site (Poland) is published by Weryński, Błażejowski & Kędzierski (2023), who report structural differences interpreted as suggestive of different adaptations for predation and possible niche partitioning between the studied taxa.
- Systematic revision of the Late Jurassic species of Caturidae is published by López-Arbarello & Ebert (2023).
- Fossil material of a putative member of the genus Caturus reported by Bogan, Taverne & Agnolin (2013) as found in the Triassic Los Menucos Group, is reinterpreted by López-Arbarello et al. (2023) as actually collected in outcrops of the Jurassic Vaca Muerta Formation, and excluded from the genus Caturus.
- Cooper & Maxwell (2023) describe a specimen of Pachycormus macropterus from the Toarcian Posidonia Shale (Germany) preserved with an unusually large ammonite inside its gut, interpreted as ingested immediately prior to and directly responsible for the fish's death.
- A study on the bone histology of Araripichthys castilhoi, interpreted as corroborating its placement within basal Teleostei, is published by Mayrinck et al. (2023).
- Stinnesbeck et al. (2023) report the presence of two different body shape types of specimens of Tselfatia formosa from the Turonian platy limestone deposit of Vallecillo (Mexico), interpreted as evidence of sexual dimorphism, and interpret the anatomy of its fins as indicating that T. formosa lived in a deep water environment and that its lifestyle resembled that of extant fan fishes.
- Cooper & Norton (2023) describe fossil material of an indeterminate plethodid from the Maastrichtian deposits from the Plateau des Phosphates (Morocco), representing the youngest occurrence of a plethodid reported to date.
- Redescription and a study on the affinities of Sorbinichthys elusivo is published by Taverne & Capasso (2023).
- Fossil material of a catfish, representing the first record of a bony fish from the Maastrichtian of the Marília Formation (Brazil) and extending known Late Cretaceous catfish distribution, is described by Candeiro et al. (2023).
- A study on the fossil record of acanthomorphs from the Maastrichtian–Paleocene strata is published by Friedman et al. (2023), who find that the majority of the principal acanthomorph groups appear in the fossil record before the end of the Paleocene.
- A study on the variety of the morphology of the first abdominal vertebral centrum in extant acanthomorphs is published by Murray & Brinkman (2023), who interpret their findings as indicating that the overall morphology of the first centrum is conservative within acanthomorph families, and that it is possible to assign many fossil acanthomorph centra to extant families, suborders or orders.
- Rust & Robinson (2023) redescribe Eothyrsites holosquamatus, and interpret this taxon as likely representing an ancestral form of gempylid.
- Fossil material representing one of the oldest records of marlins reported to date is described from the Miocene (Aquitanian) Northern Alpine Foreland Basin (Austria) by De Gracia, Berning & Kriwet (2023), who report evidence of coexistence of marlins, xiphiorhynchine xiphiids and aglyptorhynchine palaeorhynchids from the Northern Alpine Foreland Basin and from the Oligocene Chandler Bridge Formation (South Carolina, United States).
- Bannikov & Zorzin (2023) interpret the percomorph genus Callipteryx as a probable member of Percoidei of uncertain affinities, and interpret Callipteryx recticaudus as a junior synonym of Callipteryx speciosus.
- Ngoepe et al. (2023) reconstruct the history of arrival order and relative abundances of major fish groups from Lake Victoria, using data from the continuous fossil record from the preceding 17,000 years, and report that cichlids did not dominate the assemblage until several thousand years into its history, but they were the only major group that had the ecological versatility that allowed them to persist once the new deep and open-water habitats emerged.
- Evidence from (mostly lanternfish) otoliths from the Lindos Bay Formation (Rhodes, Greece), interpreted as indicative of an overall decline of the median size of lanternfishes in the eastern Mediterranean during MIS 19 interglacial, but also as indicative of different trends in size in individual mesopelagic species across the studied time interval, is presented by Agiadi et al. (2023).

== Lobe-finned fishes ==
Name	Novelty	Status	Authors	Age	Type locality	Location	Notes	Images
Braccodus	Gen. et sp. nov	Valid	Elliott, Challands & Smithson	Carboniferous		United Kingdom	A lungfish. The type species is B. kerri.	
Ceratodus shishkini	Sp. nov	Valid	Minikh	Triassic		Russia (Orenburg Oblast)	A lungfish. Published online in 2023, but the issue date is listed as December 2022.	
Eusthenodon leganihanne	Sp. nov		Downs et al.	Devonian (Famennian)	Catskill Formation	United States (Pennsylvania)		
Hyneria udlezinye	Sp. nov	Valid	Gess & Ahlberg	Devonian (Famennian)	Witpoort Formation	South Africa		
Janvierpaucidentes	Gen. et sp. nov	Valid	Johanson et al.	Devonian (Pragian)	Wood Bay Formation	Norway	A lungfish. The type species is J. tuulingi.	
Lanarkodus	Gen. et sp. nov	Valid	Elliott, Challands & Smithson	Carboniferous		United Kingdom	A lungfish. The type species is L. clarki.	
Rhizodopsis rankini	Sp. nov		Elliott	Carboniferous		United Kingdom	A member of the family Megalichthyidae.	
Rieppelia	Gen. et sp. nov	Valid	Ferrante & Cavin	Middle Triassic (Anisian)	Besano Formation	Switzerland	A coelacanth belonging to the family Latimeriidae. The type species is R. heinzfurreri.	
Ticinepomis ducanensis	Sp. nov	Valid	Ferrante et al.	Middle Triassic	Prosanto Formation	Switzerland	A coelacanth belonging to the family Latimeriidae.	
Whiteia giganteus	Sp. nov		Brownstein	Late Triassic	Dockum Group	United States (Texas)	A coelacanth.	

=== Lobe-finned fish research ===
- Dupret et al. (2023) describe new fossil material of sarcopterygians from the Devonian (Givetian) Valentia Slate Formation (Republic of Ireland), including a tooth plate of a lungfish with a derived morphology otherwise only known from Late Devonian and later taxa, and a possible rhizodontid fossil material, which might indicate that a dispersal of rhizodontids from Gondwana into Euramerica happened as early as middle Givetian.

== General research ==
- Kuznetsov & Kryukova (2023) present new reconstructions of subcephalic musculature for Pucapampella, Eusthenopteron and Ichthyostega.
- Baucon et al. (2023) describe fish-feeding traces from the Lower Cretaceous (Hauterivian–Barremian) Palombini Shale Formation (Italy), interpreted as the earliest direct evidence of bottom-living vertebrates from the deep sea.
- Trif et al. (2023) describe a diverse fish assemblage from the Priabonian strata in the Leghia-Tabără area (Romania), including the first record of Physogaleus alabamensis from Europe and the first record of Striatolamia tchelkarnurensis outside the Turgai Strait region.
