= Mesogobius nigronotatus =

Scientific classification
- Domain: Eukaryota
- Kingdom: Animalia
- Phylum: Chordata
- Class: Actinopterygii
- Order: Gobiiformes
- Family: Gobiidae
- Genus: Mesogobius
- Species: M. nigronotatus

Binomial name
- Mesogobius nigronotatus (Kessler, 1877)

Synonyms
- Gobius nigronotatus Kessler, 1877

Species of fish

Mesogobius nigronotatus is a species of gobiid fish native to the Caspian Sea. It is only known from a couple of samples, from Kazakhstan and the southern part of the sea; the type material has been lost. It is suspected to be the same taxon as that known as Mesogobius nonultimus.

It has been found at a depth of 43 metres (141 ft). The length of the fish was 6 centimetres (2.4 in) TL.
