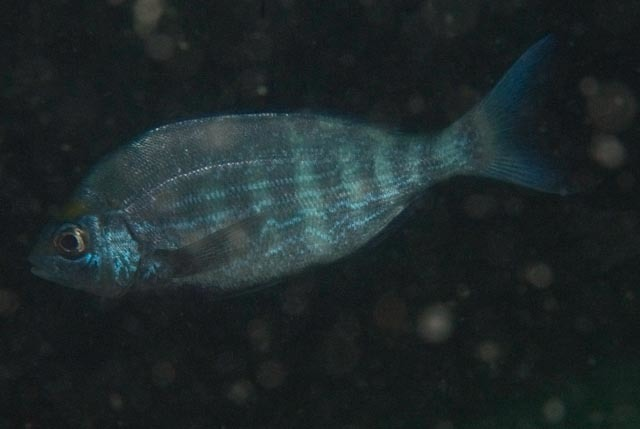

Conservation status
- Least Concern (IUCN 3.1)

Scientific classification
- Kingdom: Animalia
- Phylum: Chordata
- Class: Actinopterygii
- Order: Acanthuriformes
- Family: Sparidae
- Genus: Spondyliosoma
- Species: S. emarginatum

Binomial name
- Spondyliosoma emarginatum (Valenciennes, 1830)

Synonyms
- Cantharus emarginatus Valenciennes, 1830; Cantharus microlepis Gilchrist & W. W. Thompson, 1909

= Spondyliosoma emarginatum =

Species of fishes

Spondyliosoma emarginatum, the steentjie seabream, is a species of marine ray-finned fish belonging to the family Sparidae, which includes the seabreams and porgies. This species is found in the southeastern Atlantic Ocean and the southwestern Indian Ocean off South Africa and maybe Madagascar.

== Taxonomy ==
Spondyliosoma emarginatum was first formally described as Cantharus emerginatus in 1830 by the French zoologist Achille Valenciennes with its type locality given as the Cape of Good Hope in South Africa. The 5th edition of Fishes of the World classifies the genus Spondyliosoma in the family Sparidae within the order Spariformes by the 5th edition of Fishes of the World. Some authorities classify this genus in the subfamily Boopsinae, but the 5th edition of Fishes of the World does not recognise subfamilies within the Sparidae.

== Etymology ==
Spondyliosoma emarginatum is classified in the genus Spondyliosoma which combines spondylus, meaning "spindle", and soma, which means body. The author of the genus, Theodore Cantor, did not explain what thus alluded to, nor is it clear. The specific name emarginatus, meaning "incised" or "notched", an allusion to the deep groove in the intraorbital of adults.

== Description ==
Spondyliosoma emarginatum has a moderately deep body which has a depth that fits into its standard length between 2 and 2.6 times. The dorsal fin is supported by 11 spines and between 11 and 13 soft rays while the anal fin has 3 spines and 10 soft rays supporting it. The dorsal profile of the head is straight from the snout to the origin of the dorsal fin but in the larger adults it becomes convex, with a notch above the eyes. The maxilla has a ridge along its side the fits into a incision in front of the eyes when the mouth is closed. The teeth are slender and pointed and are arranged in4 or 5 rows in each jaw with the outer row being the largest teeth. The overall colour is brownish or grey, paler on the breast and belly, with dark lines on the scale rows above the lateral line, with thin grey or yellow lines below the lateral line. The dorsal and anal fins are dark greenish with some mottling sometimes present on the spined part of the dorsal fin. The pectoral and caudal fins are dusky while the pelvic fins are dull golden. This species has a maximum published total length of 45 cm (18 in), although 25 cm (9.8 in) is more typical.

== Distribution and habitat ==
Spondyliosoma emarginatum is found in the southeastern AtlanticOcean and the southwestern Indian Ocean and is endemic to South Africa between Saldanha Bay on the Atlantic coast of the Western Cape to KwaZulu-Natal. There is a record from southern Madagascar but this is regarded as dubious. It is found at depths down to 60 m (200 ft) over offshore areas of rocky substrates but it may also be found in estuaries.

== Biology ==
Spondyliosoma emarginatum has a diet dominated by algae and crustaceans while the juveniles feed on zooplankton. This species is a protogynous hermaphrodite, spawning between July and October in the Western Cape. The eggs are laid in an excavated nest which is guarded by the male. Sexual maturity is reached at a fork length of around 23.5 cm (9.3 in) in females and 24.9 cm (9.8 in) for males. Most females are sexually mature from 3 years old. One of the main predators of the steentjie seabream is the Red steenbras (Petrus rupestris).

== Fisheries ==
Spondyliosoma emarginatum is usually considered to be too small to market and is not a species that is targeted by fishers; although some fishes caught may be kept for bait or personal consumption. This species makes up a small part of recreational and commercial skiboat catches in the southeastern and southwestern Cape. It is mainly used as bait but, as population of larger fishes descline, it is increasingly taken to be consumed. It is occasionally caught by shore anglers and is infrequently landed by beach seine nets in the southwestern Cape.
