= Vango (fish) =

Vango Temporal range: Late Cretaceous, ~70–65.8 Ma

Scientific classification
- Domain: Eukaryota
- Kingdom: Animalia
- Phylum: Chordata
- Class: Actinopterygii
- Order: Gonorynchiformes
- Family: Chanidae
- Genus: †Vango; Murray et al., 2023
- Species: †V. fahiny

Binomial name
- †Vango fahiny Murray et al., 2023

Extinct genus of lizards

Vango is an extinct genus of milkfish from the Late Cretaceous Lac Kinkony and Anembalemba members of the Maevarano Formation of Madagascar. The type (and sole) species is Vango fahiny.

== Discovery and naming ==
Matt Friedman was the first to recognize the presence of a gonorynchiform species in the Maevarano fauna, and Murray et al. (2023) named and described Vango fahiny shortly after.

The material that was referred to Vango by Murray et al. (2023) includes opercles, hyomandibulae, frontals, basioccipitals, vertebrae, and parts of the pectoral girdle. No known articulated specimens exist; the species is only known from isolated elements.

The word Vango means "skull" in Malagasy, but in western Madagascar it also refers to milkfish (Chanos chanos) and bonefish (Albula sp.). The species name means "ancient" in Malagasy, and thus the full binomial name translates roughly to "ancient milkfish".

== Description ==
Vango is similar to the extant milkfish (Chanos chanos) but can be easily distinguished from that species by numerous features, such as the basioccipital and maxilla being relatively shorter than those of C. chanos, and the opercle being rounder overall and having a shorter auricular process. Murray et al. (2023) estimated that Vango was able to reach a maximum size of around 8 kg in mass and 1 meter in length, slightly smaller than its modern relative C. chanos.

== Paleobiology ==
The remains of Vango fahiny are known from both the Lac Kinkony and Anembalemba members of the Maevarano Formation. The Lac Kinkony preserves a series of tidally-influenced deposits that were likely a brackish estuary during the Maastrichtian, however the Anembalemba was more inland and likely represents a freshwater river system in a seasonally dry tropical climate. The presence of Vango remains in both freshwater and marine influenced sediments indicate that it was somewhat euryhaline, similar to its extant relative Chanos chanos.

The waters in which Vango lived in were shared with various other fish species, including gar (Lepisosteus) and bonefish (Paralbula). Other aquatic vertebrates from both the Lac Kinkony and Anembalemba members include the frog Beelzebufo, the side-necked turtle Kinkonychelys, the snake Kelyophis, and the crocodylimorph Mahajangasuchus.
