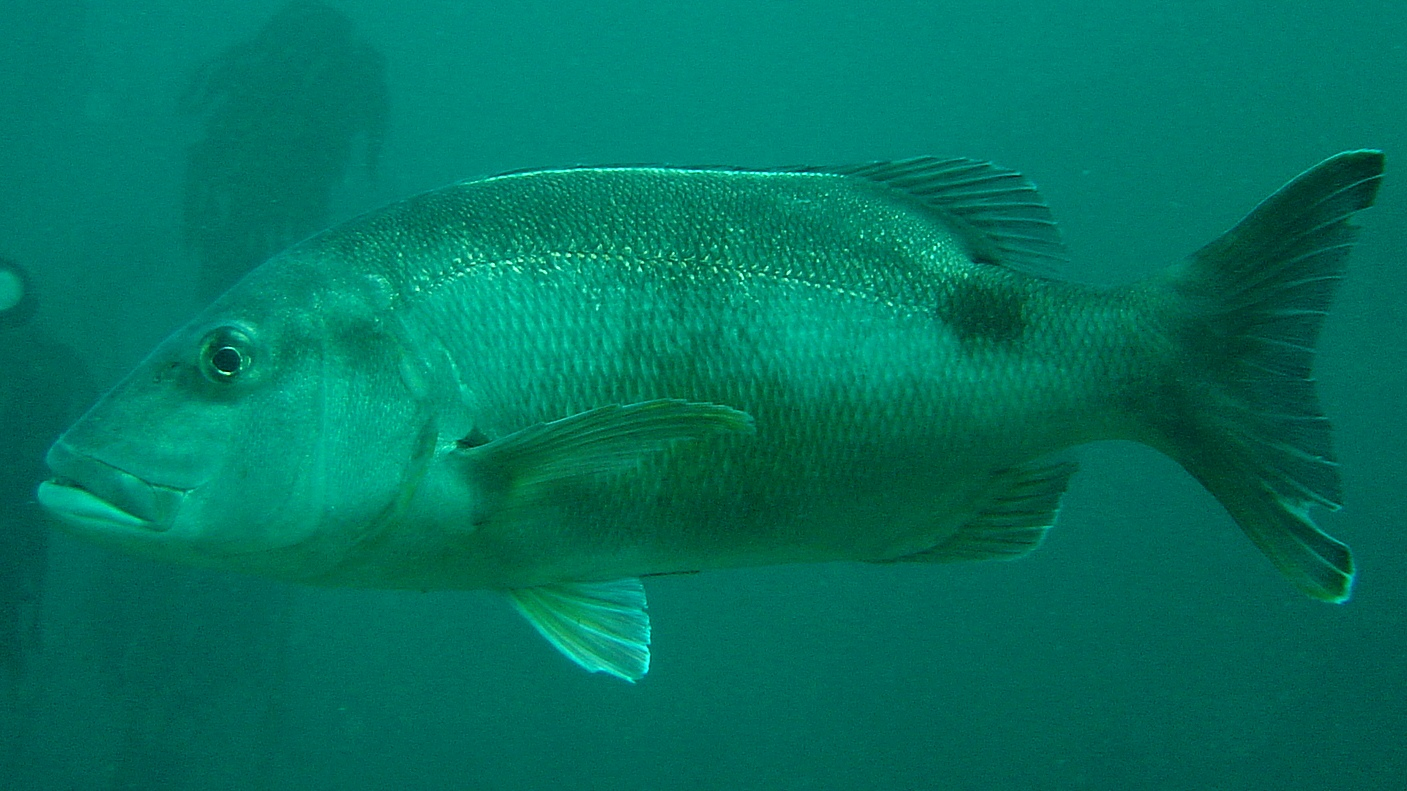

Conservation status
- Critically Endangered (IUCN 3.1)

Scientific classification
- Kingdom: Animalia
- Phylum: Chordata
- Class: Actinopterygii
- Order: Acanthuriformes
- Family: Sparidae
- Genus: Petrus; Smith, 1938
- Species: P. rupestris

Binomial name
- Petrus rupestris (Valenciennes, 1830)

Synonyms
- Dentex rupestris Valenciennes, 1830; Dentex brevis Kner, 1865

= Red steenbras =

Species of fish

The red steenbras (Petrus rupestris) is a species of fish in the family Sparidae and the only known member of the monospecific genus Petrus. This species is endemic to South Africa. The species' population has been depleted by overfishing in African waters and it has been classified as an endangered species by the International Union for Conservation of Nature.

== Taxonomy ==
The red steenbras was first formally described in 1830 as Dentex rupestris by the French zoologist Achille Valenciennes in Histoire naturelle des poissons which he wrote with Georges Cuvier. The type locality was given as the Cape of Good Hope. In 1938 the South African ichthyologist James Leonard Brierley Smith places D. rupestris in a new monospecific genus, Petrus. This taxon is placed in the family Sparidae within the order Spariformes by the 5th edition of Fishes of the World. Some authorities classify this genus in the subfamily Denticinae, but the 5th edition of Fishes of the World does not recognise subfamilies within the Sparidae.

== Etymology ==
The red steenbras has the generic name Petrus which comes from the Greek petra, meaning "rock", and is thought to be a reference to the rocky habitat preferred by this species. The specific name is rupestris, which means "dweller in rocks", again an allusion to this species rock habitat.

== Description ==
The red steenbras has scales on the head that extend past the level of the eyes. The limbs of the gill rakers are both short. The bases of the soft rayed parted of the dorsal and anal fins are densely scaled. The dorsal fin is supported by 10 spines and 10 or 11 soft rays while the anal fin has 3 spines and 8 soft rays. The body is elongate, compressed and moderately elongate and has a depth that first into its standard length 2.5 to 3 times. The dorsal profile of the head is almost straight between the snout and the origin of the dorsal fin in juveniles, becoming slightly convex as the fish grows. The front of the upper jaw has 4 robust canine-like teeth while there are between 4 and 6 similar teeth on the front of the lower jaw, on each jaw there is a band of fine teeth behind the canine-like teeth. The overall colour reddish, bronzy or golden-yellow with the young fish having a blotch to the rear of the dorsal fin. This is the largest species in the family Sparidae with a maximum total length of 200 cm (79 in), although 100 cm (39 in) is more typical, and a maximum published weight of 80 kg (180 lb).

== Distribution and habitat ==
The red steenbras is endemic to South Africa where it occurs from Table Bay in the Western Cape to St Lucia, KwaZulu-Natal. It is found at depths between 5 and 150 m (16 and 492 ft), with the adults found on offshore rocky reefs at depths greater than 50 m (160 ft) while the juveniles are found in shallower reefs.

== Biology ==
The red steenbras is a carnivore which feeds on octopuses, crabs and fishes, especially Spondyliosoma emarginatum. This fish is a late maturing gonochorist, and is regarded as a rudimentary hermaphrodite, in that uit has both male and female reproductive tissue. It reaches sexual maturity at 7.2 years old and at an average total length of 63 cm (25 in) in both males and females. The spawning season runs from August to October. SPawing seems to be confined to an area of sea between East London and southern KwaZulu-Natal and also on the offshore Agulhas Bank. They form spawning aggregations and the females have large ovaries which suggest that they are very fecund.

== Fisheries and conservation ==
The red steenbras was an important recreational and commercial fisheries target in South Africa but in 2012 a moratorium was placed on its fishing. It is a long lived and slowing maturing fish that undertake a northwards migration to off the Eastern Cape to spawn. Here they were historically fished for by both recreational and commercial line fishermen. The life history traits shown by this species make it highly vulnerable to overfishing and make the recovery of the population very difficult. Illegal fishing, particularly targeting spawning schools, continues to pose a serious threat to this species and hold back the recovery of its population. As the red steenbras is a long-lived, slow growing and late maturing species that has been overfished in the past and there has been no indication that the stock has recovered the International Union for Conservation of Nature have classified it as Endangered and state that it almost reaches the threshold of being classified as Critically Endangered, calling for research into the true status of the population and to measure the effectiveness of the moratorium on fishing.
