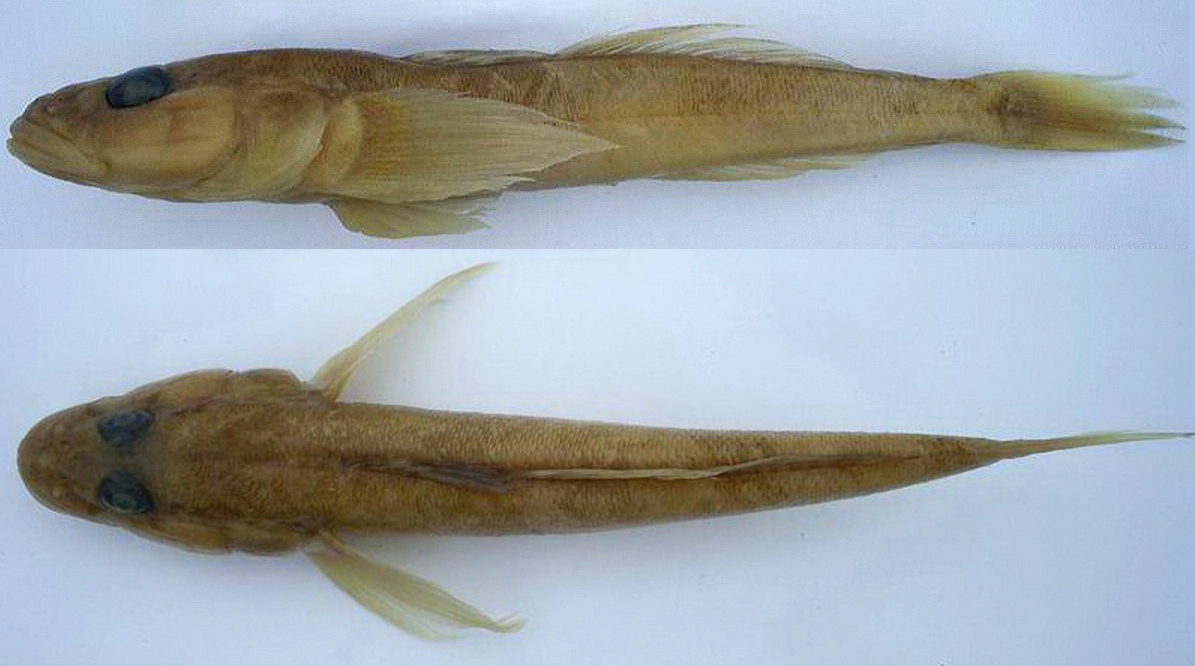

Scientific classification
- Kingdom: Animalia
- Phylum: Chordata
- Class: Actinopterygii
- Order: Gobiiformes
- Family: Gobiidae
- Genus: Mesogobius
- Species: M. nonultimus

Binomial name
- Mesogobius nonultimus (Iljin, 1936)

Synonyms
- Gobius nonultimus Iljin, 1936

= Mesogobius nonultimus =

Species of fish

Mesogobius nonultimus, or the Caspian toad goby, is one of the species of gobiid fish endemic to the brackish-waters Caspian Sea (lake). It will grow up to a length of 17.4 cm.

It has been recorded from Turkmenistan, Daghestan, Azerbaijan and Iran, and is probably found throughout the lake, in the coastal zone down to 50 m depth. Its sister taxon in the Black Sea basin is Mesogobius batrachocephalus.
