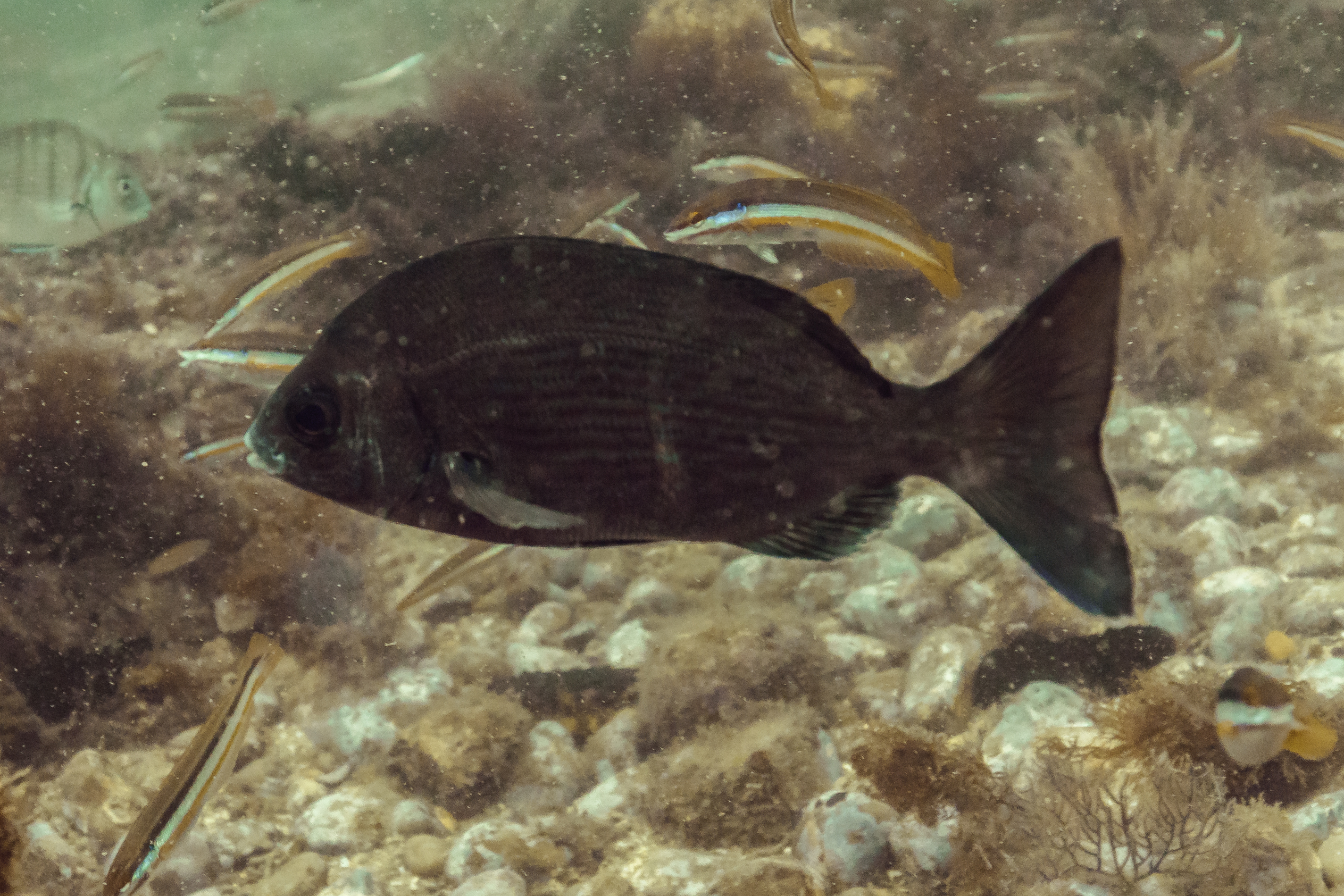

Conservation status
- Least Concern (IUCN 3.1)

Scientific classification
- Kingdom: Animalia
- Phylum: Chordata
- Class: Actinopterygii
- Division: Teleostei
- Order: Acanthuriformes
- Family: Sparidae
- Genus: Spondyliosoma
- Species: S. cantharus

Binomial name
- Spondyliosoma cantharus (Linnaeus, 1758)
- Range of black seabream

Synonyms
- Sparus cantharus Linnaeus, 1758; Cantharus cantharus (Linnaeus, 1758); Sparus lineatus Montagu, 1818; Cantharus lineatus (Montagu, 1818); Cantharus senegalensis Valenciennes, 1830; Cantharus vulgaris Valenciennes, 1830

= Black seabream =

Species of fish

The black seabream (Spondyliosoma cantharus) is a species of marine ray-finned fish belonging to the family Sparidae, which includes the seabreams and porgies. This fish has a wide distribution in the eastern Atlantic Ocean and the Mediterranean and Black Seas. The black seabream is an important food fish, especially in Europe.

== Taxonomy ==
The black seabream was first formally described as Sparus cantharus by Carl Linnaeus in the 10th edition of Systema Naturae published in 1758 with its type locality given as the Mediterranean. In 1816 Georges Cuvier classified it in the new genus Cantharus, the black bream being the type species by tautonymy, but Cantharus was preoccupied so Theodore Cantor renamed the genus Spondyliosoma in 1849. The 5th edition of Fishes of the World classifies the genus Spondyliosoma in the family Sparidae within the order Spariformes by the 5th edition of Fishes of the World. Some authorities classify this genus in the subfamily Boopsinae, but the 5th edition of Fishes of the World does not recognise subfamilies within the Sparidae.

== Etymology ==
The black seabream is classified in the genus Spondyliosoma which combines spondylus, meaning "spindle", and soma, which means body. The author of the genus, Cantor, did not explain what thus alluded to, nor is it clear. The specific name cantharus which is a latinisation of kantharos, an Ancient Greek name for this species, dating from at least the time of Aristotle.

== Description ==
The black seabream has a moderately deep body with a small, round profiled head with a mouth that extends as far back as the front of the eye. The dorsal fin is supported by 11 spines and between 11 and 13 soft rays and there are 3 spines and 9 to 11 soft rays supporting the anal fin. In adults the dorsal profile of the head is convex. The cheeks, operculum and preoperculum have no scales. There are 4 to 6 rows of conical and thin teeth, the outer teeth enlarged especially at the front of the jaw, in both jaws. The caudal fin is slightly forked. The colour if this fish is darker grey on the upper body, silvery on the flanks, with between 6 and 9 dark vertical bars along the body. The males may turn nearly black when nesting. This species has a maximum published total length of 60 cm (24 in), although 30 cm (12 in) is more typical, and a maximum published weight of 1.2 kg (2.6 lb).

== Distribution and habitat ==
The black seabream has a wide distribution in the eastern Atlantic Ocean from Scandinavia in the north to Namibia in the south, including the Macaronesia, the Mediterranean and the western Black Sea. It is found at depths between 5 and 300 m (16 and 984 ft) over seagrass beds and rocky and sandy substrates.

== Biology ==
The black seabream is omnivorous, feeding on algae and benthic invertebrates. especially crustaceans. It often gathers in large schools. This species is a protogynous hermaphrodite, the females can attain sexual maturity at around two years old and a total length of 17.3 cm (6.8 in) while in the males sexual maturity is reached at around three years old and a total length 22.7 cm (8.9 in). Once they have matured as males the appear to remain male until reaching a length of 30 cm (12 in) and all fishes over 40 cm (16 in) are female.

In Britain and Ireland this species spawns in April and May and the fish move from wintering areas in deeper offshore waters to more coastal waters. The males excavate a shallow depression in the sand or gravel piling the spoil around the edge to create a crater like structure. The female then lays the eggs into this depression and the male guards the eggs from predators and keeps them clear of debris until they hatch. Farther south, spawning takes place earlier in the year.

== Fisheries ==
The black seabream is a valued food fish and is an important target species for commercial fisheries, as well as for recreational fishers during the spawning season. It is targeted throughout its extensive distribution but especially to the north of Senegal. It is caught by line fishing, trawling, beach seines, fixed nets and fish traps. This species is landed throughout the year but the amount landed varies seasonally. It is sold fresh, frozen or salted and dried and the flesh is highly valued. Some of the catch is processed to produce fish meal and oil. Black seabream is frequently sold in the markets in Tunisia, Morocco, Italy, Cyprus, Greece, Turkey and Sicily, and is infrequently marketed in other areas. 3,200 t (3,100 long tons; 3,500 short tons) are landed in Portugal per annum, where this fish is a very important species for commercial inshore fisheries.
