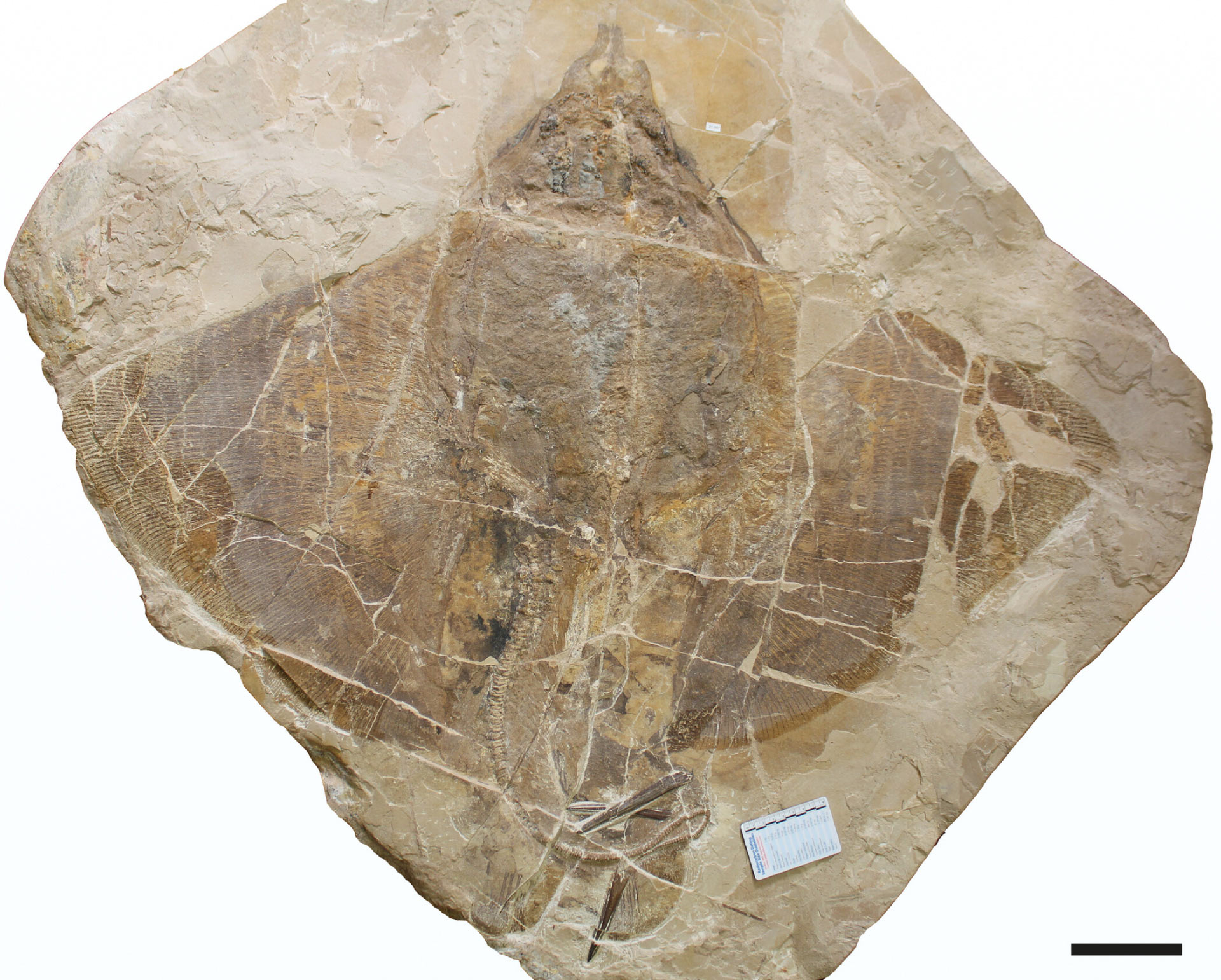
- Holotype specimen

Scientific classification
- Kingdom: Animalia
- Phylum: Chordata
- Class: Chondrichthyes
- Subclass: Elasmobranchii
- Order: Myliobatiformes
- Family: †Dasyomyliobatidae; Marramà et al, 2023
- Genus: †Dasyomyliobatis; Marramà et al, 2023
- Species: †D. thomyorkei

Binomial name
- †Dasyomyliobatis thomyorkei Marramà, Villalobos-Segura, Zorzin, Kriwet & Carnevale, 2023

= Dasyomyliobatis =

Dasyomyliobatis Temporal range: Late Ypresian, 50–49 Ma

Extinct genus of cartilaginous fishes

Dasyomyliobatis is an extinct genus of prehistoric stingray in the monotypic family Dasyomyliobatidae, of the order Myliobatiformes. It contains a single species, D. thomyorkei, known from fossil remains from the Early Eocene-aged Monte Bolca Lagerstätte of Italy. The specific epithet references the English musician and Radiohead frontman Thom Yorke.

The genus is characterized by a unique hybrid dentition and pectoral fin morphology that allowed the shift from undulatory (undulating the ends of the fins in repeated waves) to oscillatory (flapping the fins up and down) swimming. This change in locomotion and dentition likely led to a shift from a benthic to pelagic lifestyle, and to exploit a variety of prey from soft-bodied to hard-shelled organisms. As suggested by the genus name, it displays intermediate traits between the whiptail stingrays (Dasyatidae) and the eagle rays (Myliobatidae), and can thus be considered a transitional form in the origin of pelagic rays. Dasyomyliobatidae is thought to represent a sister group to the Myliobatidae, and the two groups likely diverged during the Late Cretaceous.

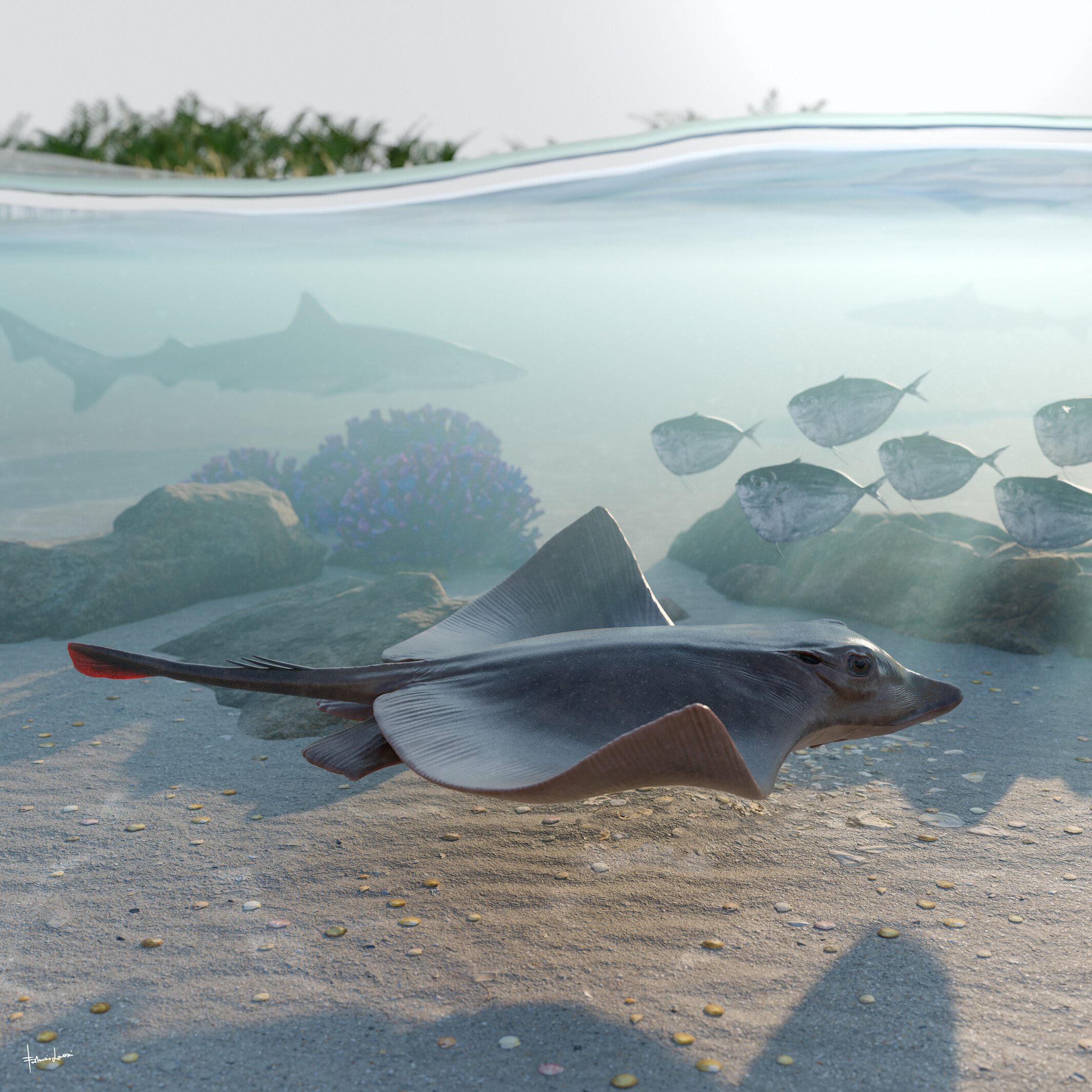
Life restoration

The Monte Bolca formation is thought to represent a shallow sea of the Tethys Ocean with scattered coral reefs and seagrass beds. With its combination of traits, Dasyomyliobatis may have been able to forage in both these shallow-water ecosystems as well as the open ocean.
