= Pomadasys zemmourensis =

Pomadasys zemmourensis Temporal range: Zanclean

Scientific classification
- Kingdom: Animalia
- Phylum: Chordata
- Class: Actinopterygii
- Order: Acanthuriformes
- Family: Haemulidae
- Genus: Pomadasys
- Species: †P. zemmourensis

Binomial name
- †Pomadasys zemmourensis Schwarzhans, 2023

Extinct species of fish

Pomadasys zemmourensis is an extinct species of haemulid in the genus Pomadasys that lived during the Zanclean stage of the Pliocene epoch.

== Distribution ==
Pomadasys zemmourensis is known from Morocco.
