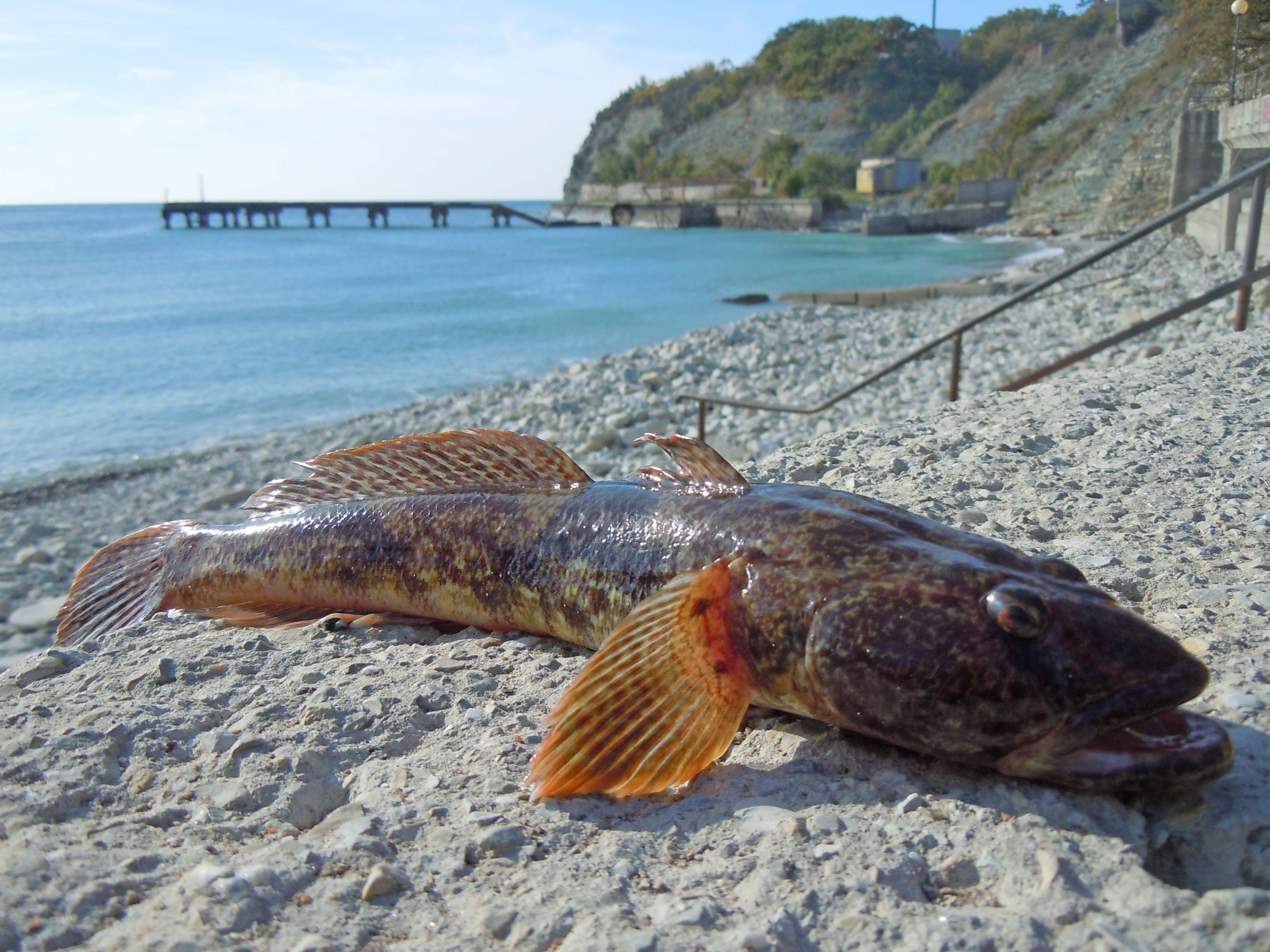
- A specimen from Gelendzhik, Caucasus

Conservation status
- Least Concern (IUCN 3.1)

Scientific classification
- Kingdom: Animalia
- Phylum: Chordata
- Class: Actinopterygii
- Division: Teleostei
- Order: Gobiiformes
- Family: Gobiidae
- Genus: Mesogobius
- Species: M. batrachocephalus

Binomial name
- Mesogobius batrachocephalus (Pallas, 1814)

Synonyms
- Gobius batrachocephalus Pallas, 1814; Neogobius batrachocephalus (Pallas, 1814)

= Mesogobius batrachocephalus =

Species of fish

Mesogobius batrachocephalus, the knout goby or toad goby, is one of the species of gobiid fish native to the Black Sea and the Sea of Azov basins. It lives in estuaries and brackish water lagoons, occasionally in fresh waters, such as the coastal Lake Siutghiol in Romania. It prefers areas near cliffs with sandy, shelly or rocky substrates at depths of from 20 to 60 metres (66 to 197 ft), sometimes down to 100 metres (330 ft). The knout goby is a piscivore. It can reach a length of 34.5 centimetres (13.6 in) SL and weight of 600 grams (1.3 lb). Maximum known age is eight years.

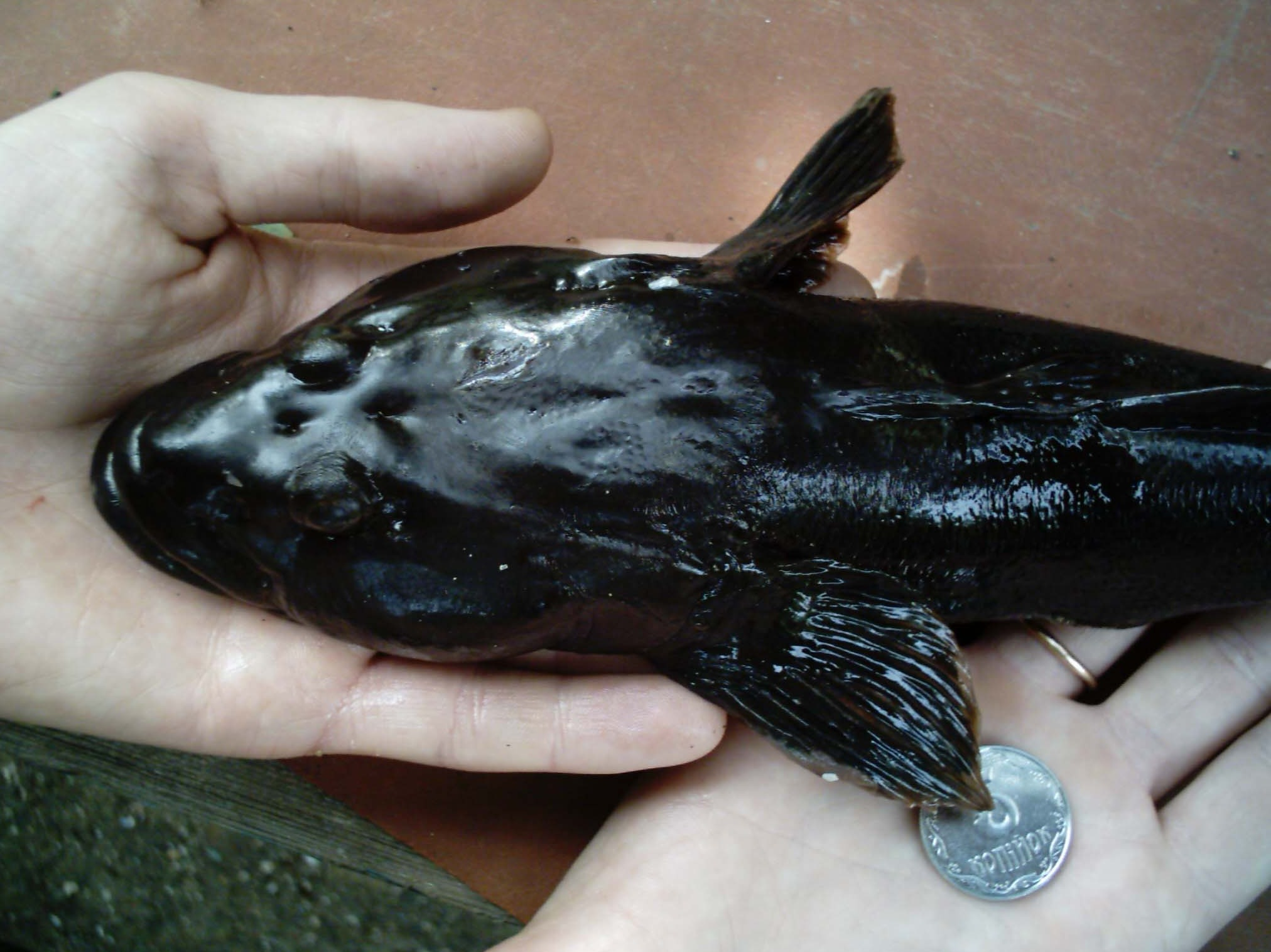
Head of the toad goby from the Gulf of Odessa
