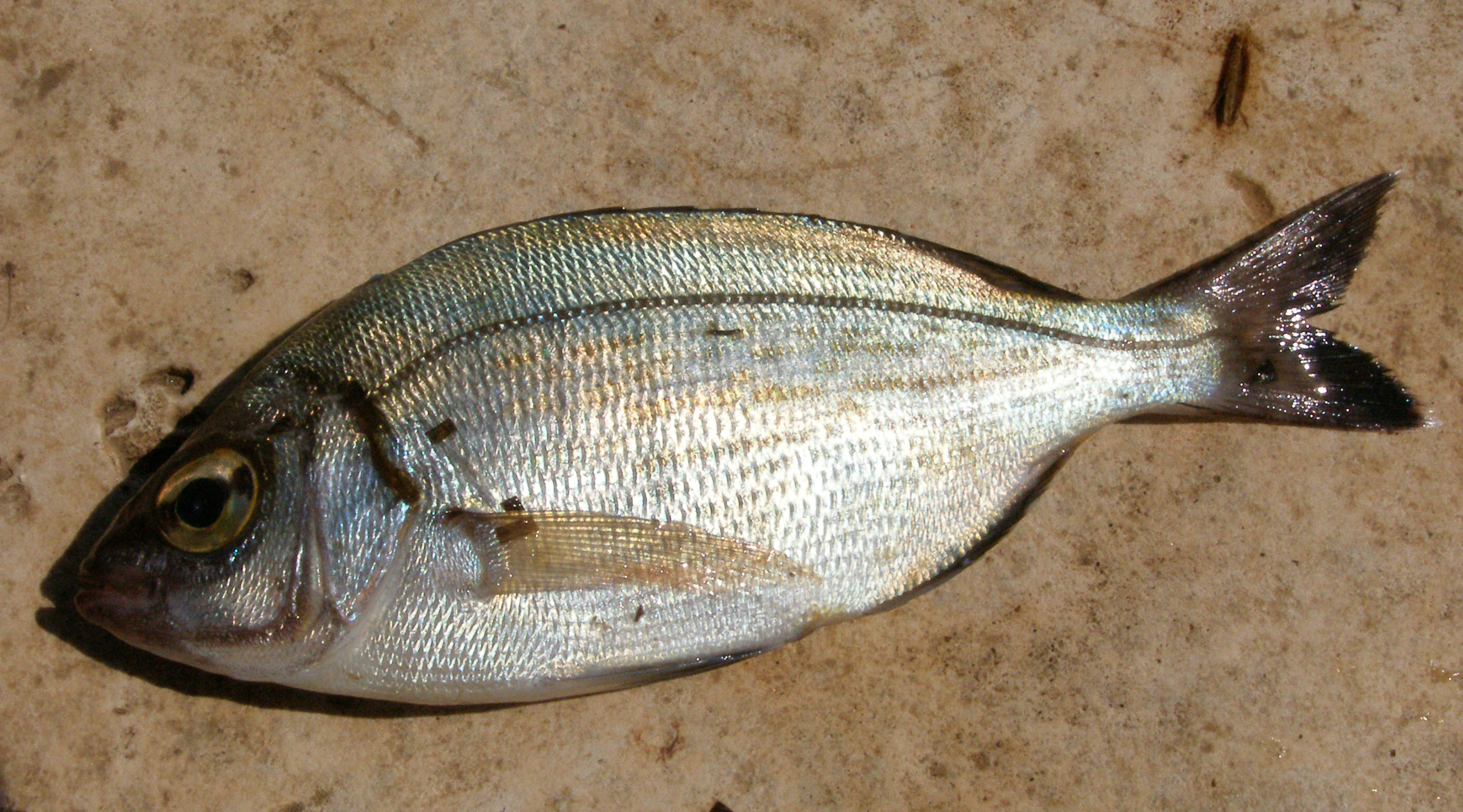
- Spondyliosoma cantharus is a species in this genus

Scientific classification
- Kingdom: Animalia
- Phylum: Chordata
- Class: Actinopterygii
- Order: Acanthuriformes
- Family: Sparidae
- Genus: Spondyliosoma; Cantor, 1849

Type species
- Sparus cantharus Linnaeus, 1758

Synonyms
- Cantharus Cuvier, 1816; Cantharusa Strand, 1928

= Spondyliosoma =

Genus of fish

Spondyliosoma is a genus of marine ray-finned fish belonging to the family Sparidae, which includes the seabreams and porgies. The genus contains two species, one, the black seabream, from the eastern Atlantic Ocean and the other, the steentjie seabream, from the western Indian Ocean.

== Taxonomy ==
Spondyliosoma was first proposed as a genus in 1849 by the Danish zoologist Theodore Cantor with Sparus cantharus being the type species. Cantor proposed the new name to replace Georges Cuvier's Cantharus which was preoccupied by Cantharus Röding, 1798 in Mollusca and by Cantharus Monfort, 1808 in Foraminifera. The type species of Cuvier's Cantharus was Sparus cantharus by monotypy, Linnaeus had described S. cantharus in the 10th edition of Systema Naturae published in 1758, with its type locality given as the Mediterranean Sea. This genus in the family Sparidae within the order Spariformes by the 5th edition of Fishes of the World. Some authorities classify this genus in the subfamily Boopsinae, but the 5th edition of Fishes of the World does not recognise subfamilies within the Sparidae.

== Etymology ==
Spondyliosoma means "spindle body", a name Cantor did not explain and it is not obvious why he gave the taxon this name.

== Species ==
Spondyliosoma contains 2 valid species:

- Spondyliosoma cantharus (Linnaeus, 1758) (Black seabream)
- Spondyliosoma emarginatum Valenciennes, 1830 (Steentjie seabream)

== Characteristics ==
Spondyliosoma seabreams are characterised by the possession of 4 to 6 rows of thin, sharp incisors in the front of both jaws. The juveniles have a row of conical teeth behind the incisors and these develop into molar-like teeth in adults. The diameter of the eye is slightly smaller than the length of the snout. There are no scales on the dorsal and anal fins but the soft-rayed parts of these fins have scaly sheaths at their bases. The larger of the 2 species in the genus is the black seabream (S. cantharus) with a maximum published standard length of 60 cm (24 in) while the steentjie seabream (S. emarginatum) has a maximum published total length of 45 cm (18 in).

== Distribution ==
Spondyliosoma seabreams have parapatric distributions with the black seabream having a wide range encompassing the eastern Atlantic Ocean between Scandinavia and Namibia, including the Mediterranean and Black Seas. The steentjie seabream is found in the southwstern Indian Ocean off South Africa and Madagascar.

== Fisheries ==
Spondyliosoma seabreams are of interest to fisheries, particularly the black seabream which is an important food fish targeted by both commercial and recreational fisheries in Europe.
