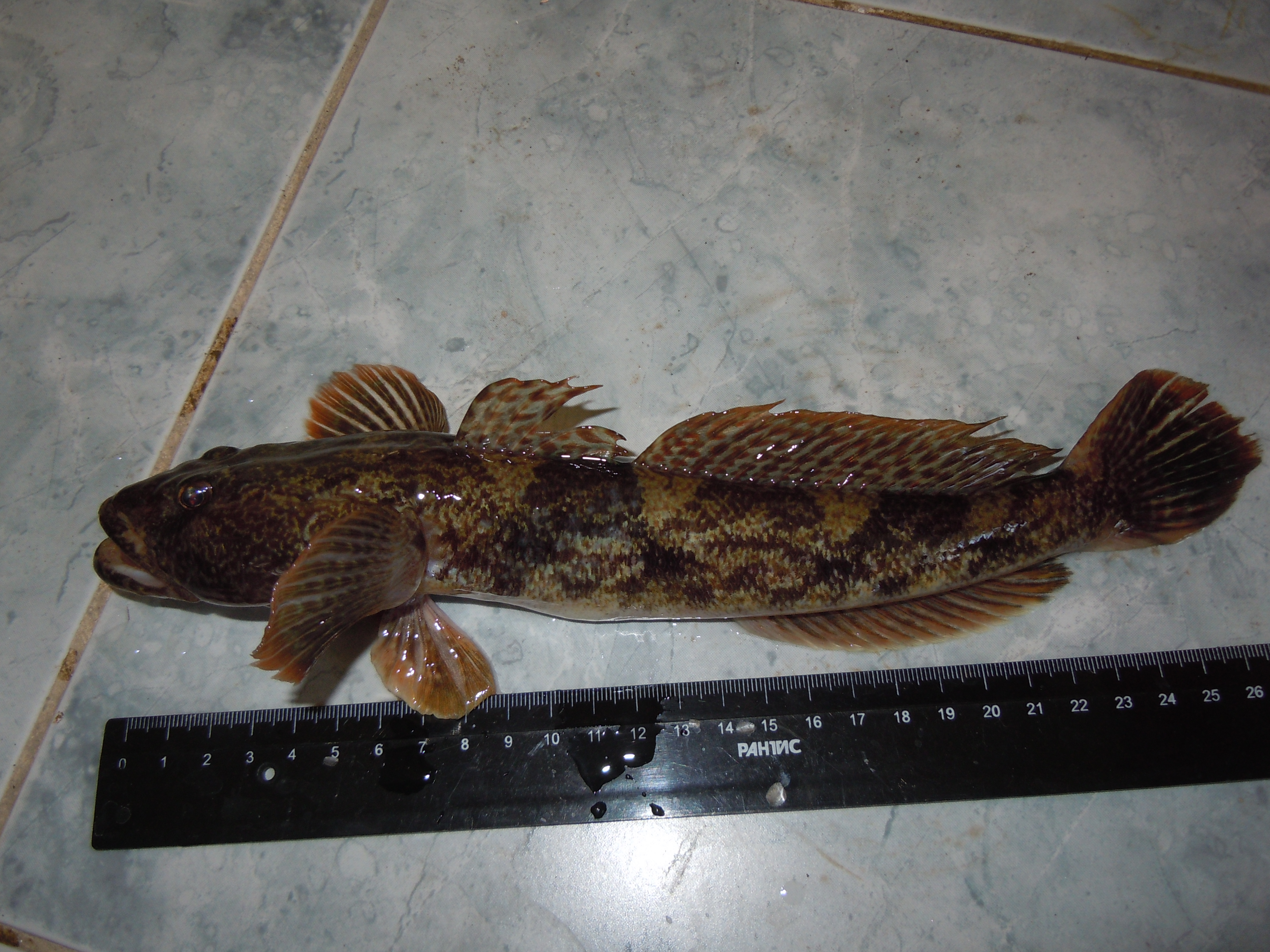
- Mesogobius batrachocephalus, the knout goby

Scientific classification
- Kingdom: Animalia
- Phylum: Chordata
- Class: Actinopterygii
- Division: Teleostei
- Order: Gobiiformes
- Family: Gobiidae
- Subfamily: Gobiinae
- Genus: Mesogobius; Bleeker, 1874

Type species
- Gobius batrachocephalus Pallas, 1814

= Mesogobius =

Genus of fishes

Mesogobius is a genus of Gobiidae, native to the basins of the Black and Caspian Seas.

== Species ==
There are two or three recognized species in this genus:.

- Mesogobius batrachocephalus (Pallas, 1814) (Knout goby)
- Mesogobius nigronotatus (Kessler, 1877) (? = M. nonultimus)
- Mesogobius nonultimus (Iljin, 1936)
