= Eurynotoides =

Eurynotoides Temporal range: Middle Permian

Scientific classification
- Domain: Eukaryota
- Kingdom: Animalia
- Phylum: Chordata
- Class: Actinopterygii
- Order: †Eurynotoidiformes
- Family: †Eurynotoididae
- Genus: †Eurynotoides; Berg, 1940

Species
- †E. costatus (Eichwald, 1861); †E. multa (Sergienko, 1974); †E. nanus (Eichwald, 1861)

Synonyms
- Heterolepis Sergienko, 1974

Extinct genus of fishes

Eurynotoides is an extinct genus of prehistoric freshwater ray-finned fish in the family Eurynotoididae of the order Eurynotoidiformes. It is known from the mid-late Permian of south-central Russia.

== Taxonomy ==
The genus was erected by Berg in 1940. In 1974, Sergienko described a new genus and species Heterolepis multa from the Middle Permian (Roadian to Wordian) of Kemerovo Region, Russia, as a new member of the Palaeoniscidae family. However, Heterolepis was already in use for the extant snake Heterolepis capensis (Smith, 1847), making Sergienko's naming a junior homonym. In 2023, A. S. Bakaev reclassified "Heterolepis" multa into Eurynotoides as E. multa. This species is different from E. nanus and E. costatus by having ganoin peninsula-shaped structures on the anterior margin of the scale as well as by the presence of denticles on both posterior and lower edge of the scale.

== See also ==
- Prehistoric fish
- List of prehistoric bony fish
