= Batomorph locomotion =

Animal locomotion

Batomorphi is a division of cartilaginous fish consisting of skates, rays and other fish all characterized by dorsoventrally flattened bodies and large pectoral fins fused to the head. This distinctive morphology has resulted in several unique forms of locomotion. Most batomorphs exhibit median paired fin swimming, utilizing their enlarged pectoral fins. Batomorphs that exhibit median paired fin swimming fall somewhere along a spectrum of swimming modes from mobuliform to rajiform based on the number of waves present on their fin at once. Of the extant orders of Batomorphi this holds truest for the Myliobatiformes (rays) and the Rajiformes (skates). The two other orders: Rhinopristiformes and Torpediniformes exhibit a greater degree of body caudal fin swimming.

== Mobuliform swimming ==
A manta ray executing several different turns. By varying the shape of its fins asymmetrically it is able to be quite maneuverable for its size and rigidity.

Mobuliform swimming is common in pelagic Myliobatiformes species such as manta rays and is characterized by a flapping motion of the pectoral fins. It is very similar in appearance to flight in birds. Batomorphs that utilize mobuliform swimming can be identified by their high aspect ratios, thicker pectoral fins that taper to a point and a lateral profile that resembles a hydrofoil. They are highly efficient open water swimmers capable of traversing great distances at high speeds.

The pectoral fins of a mobuliform swimming ray experience a spanwise dorsoventral deformation that is highest at the tip and a chord-wise traveling wave. Kinematically mobuliform swimming consists of low frequency, high amplitude fin flapping with less than one waveform present on the fin at a time. In order to increase speed pelagic rays will increase the frequency of pectoral flaps.

Rays are at a disadvantage compared to other fish when it comes to maneuverability. Their rigid body gives them a high moment of inertia and their dorsoventrally flattened shape makes it difficult to maintain turns because they are unable to provide the lateral forces necessary to prevent slip. Banking during a turn has been exhibited across both types of median paired fin swimming and it allows them to compensate for the lack of control surface that they would have in an unbanked turn. Mobuliform swimmers tend to be just as maneuverable as rajiform swimmers, even though their turning mechanics are different; the former move with gliding turns while the latter move through asymmetrical undulations of the fins. However, some species like the Pelagic Stingray are more maneuverable because they are able to reverse the wave along their fins and even swim backwards.

In a pelagic environment rays will encounter surface waves. Experimental interactions with incoming waves for Cownose rays has shown that rays will cease swimming and form a positive dihedral with their pectoral fins allowing them to maintain their position in the water column. When travelling in the same direction of a wave it has been shown that they will increase their speed while reducing the amplitude of their fins which indicates that they may use travelling waves to increase their swimming efficiency.

== Rajiform swimming ==
An example of a rajiform batomorph. Notice that the movement is restricted to the distal part of the fin unlike mobuliform swimming.

Rajiform swimmers move by undulating the distal parts of their pectoral fins with multiple waveforms present on the fin at a time. This mode of swimming is utilized by demersal batomorphs, which includes skates as well as some rays. They share a common morphology of a low aspect ratio and thin pelvic fins. They are slower than mobuliform swimmers but they are some of the most metabolically efficient elasmobranch swimmers at slow speeds.

There are differences between the ways skates and benthic rays utilize rajiform swimming. Rajiformes do not always utilize rajiform swimming. They have a second set of pelvic fins called crura on the ventral side near the base of their tail that they use to in tandem to push along the substrate while their disk remains inactive. This style of locomotion is known as punting and is very similar to walking as the force appears to be generated from direct contact with the ground. They are able to execute asynchronous movements with their crura to make turns which negates the need to bank during turns, which may provide stealth benefits in addition to the reduced water movement. From muscle fiber analysis it appears that punting may be a primary mode of transportation at low speeds (about 1/3 Body lengths per second) in some skates and rajiform locomotion may be used when for specific situations. Benthic rays rely entirely on rajiform locomotion. Another difference between the two is the role of the tail. Skates have larger tails with fins on them and they use them during turns. The tails of rays appear to serve no function in swimming. Some rays, known as stingrays have a venomous barb on their tail that they whip around to defend themselves.

The distribution of pectoral thin thickness is such that rajiform swimmers benefit passively from hydrodynamic interaction between the substrate and their fins. As such swimming away from the substrate for extended periods is unsustainable. The thickness of the pelvic fins is highest at the anterior part of fin and lowest at the distal parts of the fin and the posterior fin, generally less than a millimeter. These thinner areas deform passively at normal speeds and must be kept rigid at higher speeds serving to limit maximum sustainable speed in rajiform swimmers.

== Body caudal fin swimming ==
=== Torpediniformes ===
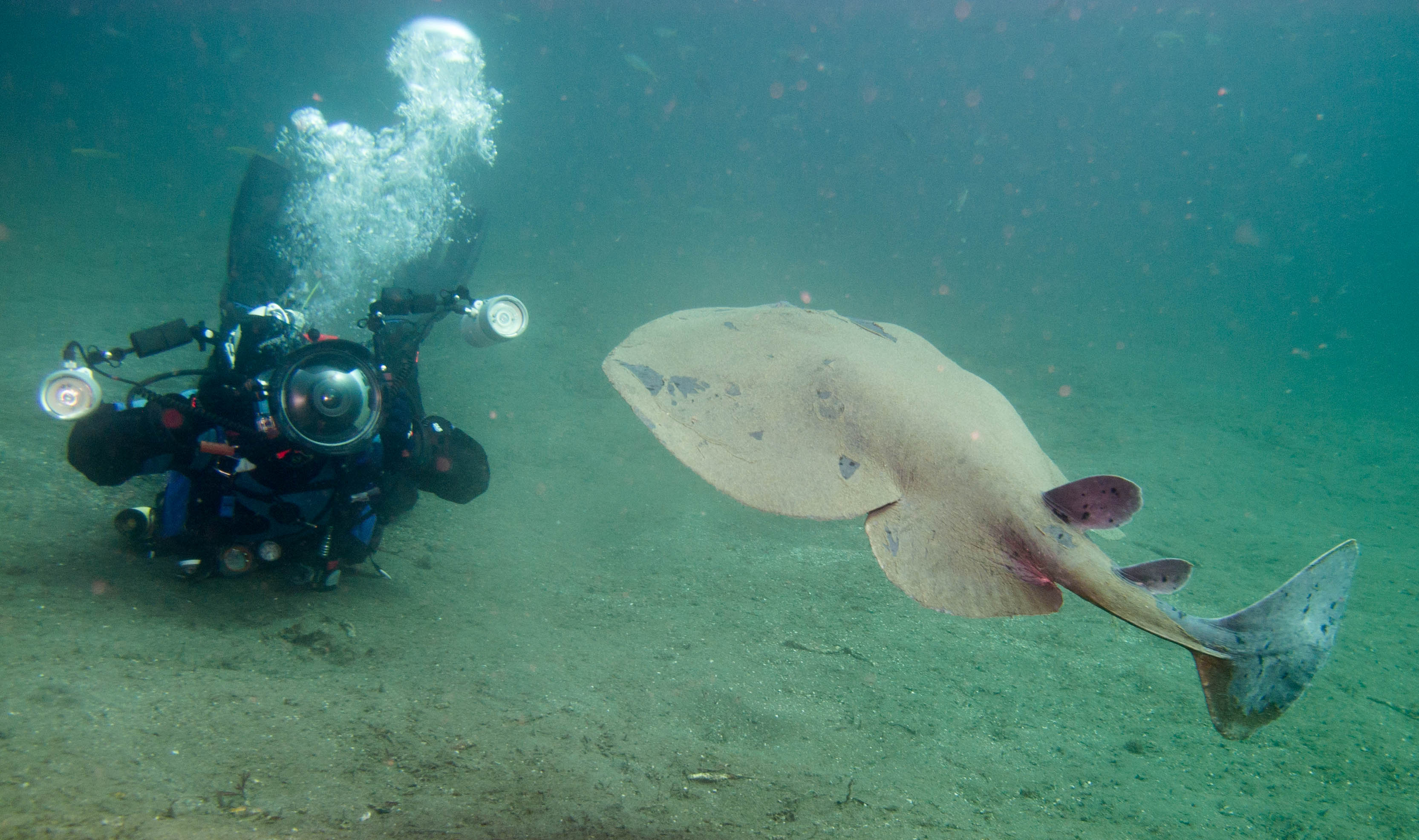
Pacific electric ray (Torpedo californica)

The majority of electric rays have a distinctive style of low speed swimming that consists of periodically moving up in the water column then gliding back down. Unlike Rajiformes and Myliobatiformes their propulsion comes solely from the movement of their caudal fin, which is much more developed than in skates and rays. The disc portion of their bodies is used to increase their efficiency during the gliding portion of their swimming.

=== Rhinopristiformes ===
An example of a rhinopristiform, the guitarfish relies on undulation of its caudal fin for propulsion

Rhinopristiformes are an intermediate group between sharks and rays. There has been little study into their swimming characteristics but it can be assumed from their morphological similarity to sharks that they rely primarily on body caudal fin swimming and the pectoral fins do not generate thrust.

== Batomorph inspired designs ==
Batomorphs have certain characteristics that would be desirable in an underwater unmanned vehicle. The nature of their movement makes them stable platforms to carry payloads. They tend to be incredibly efficient swimmers. Many pelagic ray species and even some benthic species undertake very long yearly migrations. Pelagic species tend to be more efficient high speed swimmers while benthic ones are efficient at lower speeds. Many Benthic rays have adapted to be incredibly stealthy, they have a low profile and create very little disturbance when they move. They have the potential to generate large thrust; this is what allows giant manta rays to completely clear the surface of the water. The variations in performance capabilities of each species lead to the development of a variety of different biomimetic automated underwater vehicles (BAUVs). There are a multitude of designs based on pelagic and benthic batomorphs, there are even some based on more obscure aspects of batomorph swimming such as one based on the unique body caudal fin propulsion of the electric ray or another that utilizes the punting seen in skates. One thing that really sets the performance of the biological and artificial versions apart is the nuanced flexibility and actuation of the disc. Different parts of the disc are considerably more flexible than others and some parts are designed to passively deform. It is especially hard to mimic the mixture of passive and active interactions of the disc of a rajiform and the ground. The complex actuation of the wings has been mimicked successfully through a variety of means including tensegrity structures, electroactive polymers, and fluid muscles. However, these technologies are not developed to the point where they can fully imitate actual muscles. To this aim, actual muscles have been used in a tissue engineered ray less than 20 mm in diameter. It was produced using rat myocardial cells that mimicked the pattern of a rajiform swimmer through the use of patterned muscle junctions.
