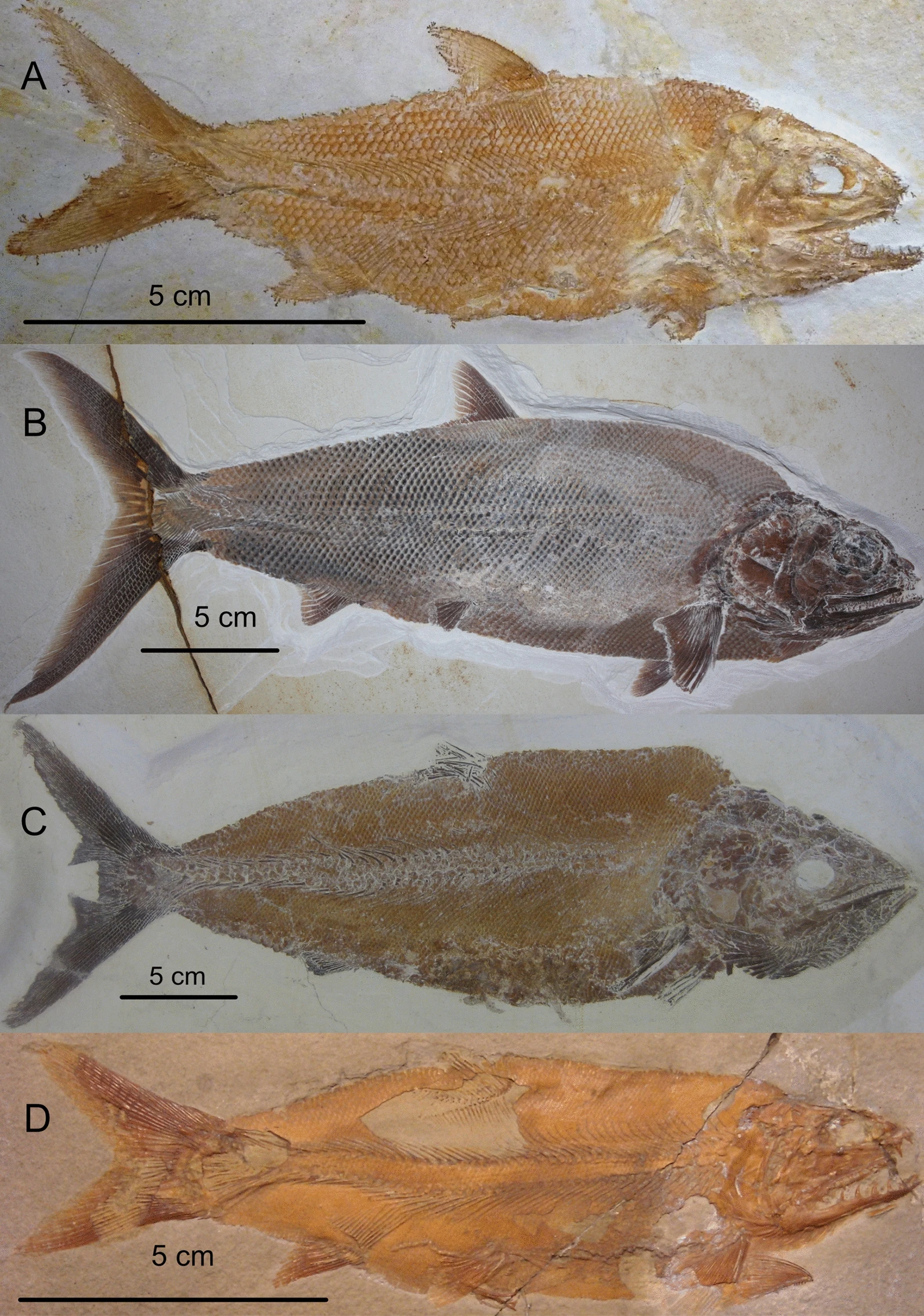
- A: Caturus latus, B: Caturus furcatus, C: Caturus enkopicaudalis, D: Amblysemius granulatus

Scientific classification
- Kingdom: Animalia
- Phylum: Chordata
- Class: Actinopterygii
- Clade: Halecomorphi
- Order: Amiiformes
- Superfamily: †Caturoidea
- Family: †Caturidae; Owen, 1860

Genera
- †Amblysemius; †Catutoichthys; †Caturus; †Strobilodus ?

= Caturidae =

Caturidae Temporal range: Late Triassic–Valanginian

Extinct family of fishes

Caturidae is an extinct family of predatory amiiform ray-finned fish, being the sister-group to the extant family Amiidae. Though their body form is very different than the modern bowfin, a number of features in the skull point towards a close relationship between the groups. Members of the family were generally larger fish that lived within more coastal marine environments along with freshwater environments near the coast. In these environments, caturids would have fed on a variety of prey items, hunting them similarly to fish like gars and barracudas. The earliest members of the family appeared in the early Late Triassic, reaching an apex of diversity during the Jurassic with the youngest records of the group date to the Early Cretaceous.

== History ==
Caturidae was erected by Owen in 1860 though members of the family have been known since the early 19th century, with genera like Caturus being described before the family was erected. Owen originally placed various fish within the family including genera that would eventually be placed within Pachycormidae including Pachycormus and Sauropsis. After the erection by Owen, Lehman added a number of genera to the family; a few of these including Allolepidotus and Lophiostomus would later be moved to other groups within Halecomorphi. Until the late 20th century, the family was considered a grade of fish rather than a true group, though later work would be done to change this.

In 1973, Patterson published a paper improving the definition though still believed the group to be paraphyletic at the time. Since Patterson's paper, other papers such as Grande & Bemis (1998) have looked at the paraphyly of the family and have pointed towards a more monophyletic family.

== Anatomy ==
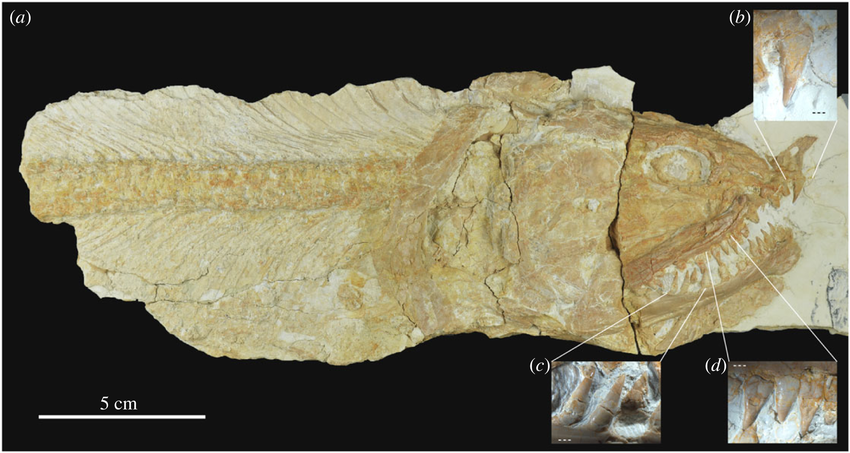
Skull of Strobilodus giganteus, a possible caturid once placed within Caturus.

=== Skull ===
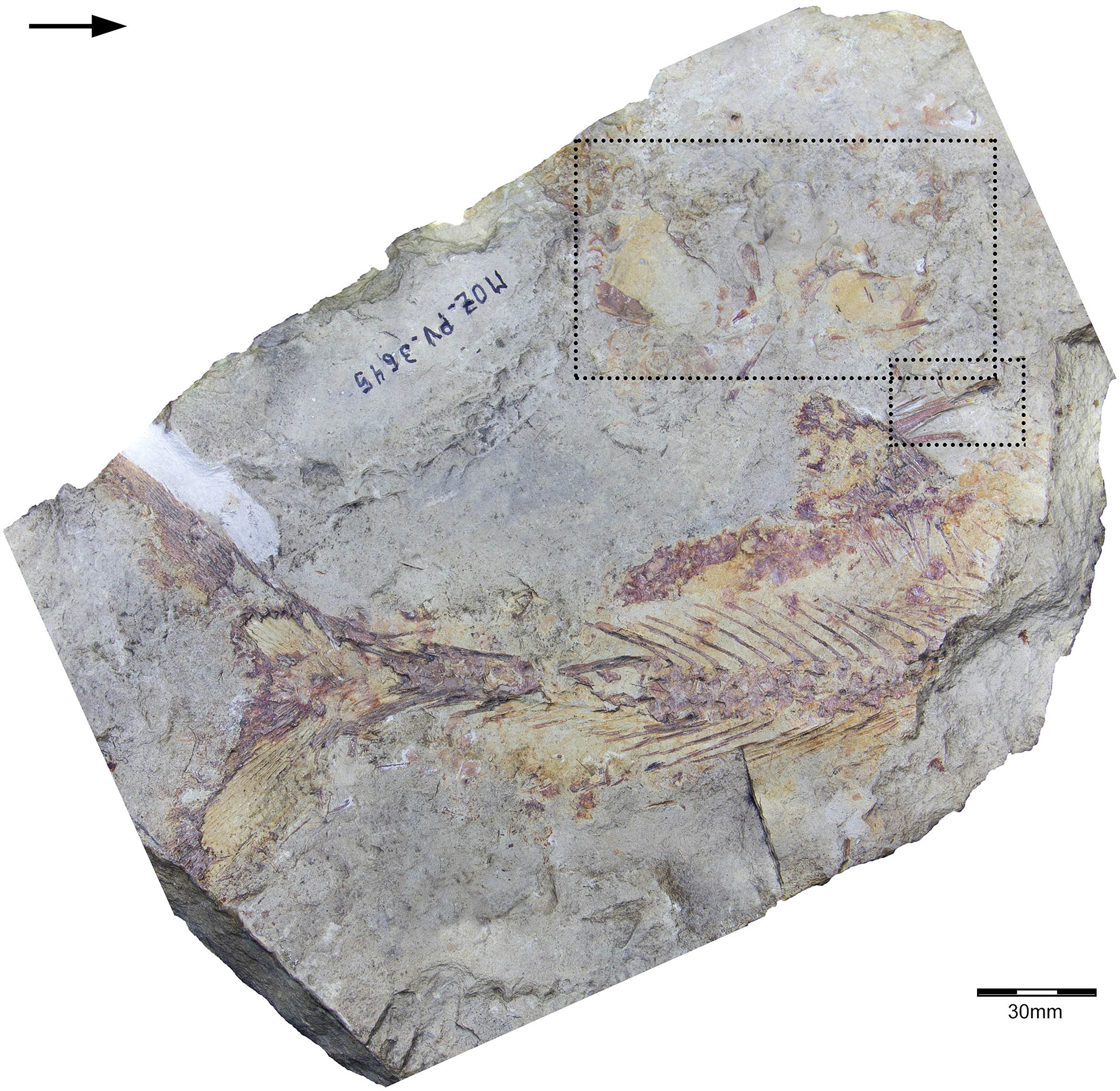
Catutoichthys olsacheri

The skulls of caturids are generally long with a skull roof being largely made up of the frontal bones and dermopterotics. In contrast to the other parts of the skull roof, the parietal bones are small and have an irregular shape. Like in other halecomorphs, multiple small supraorbitals are present. Their maxilla were straight and thin; the larger teeth on the maxilla and premaxilla possess an acrodin cap. The attachment of the teeth is similar to other more basal ray-finned fish groups, being the total ankylosis (fusion) of the teeth to the premaxilla, maxilla, and dentary. The teeth of the lower dentition are shorter and wider than those on the upper dentition. Caturids have a large amount of wide branchiostegal rays, with the number of them ranging between 20 and 30. Similar to amiids and other haleocomorphs, caturids lack the pterotic bone within the braincase. Though the opisthotic is suggested to be absent in some descriptions of the braincase, papers like Maisey (1999) have also put forward that it may have fused with the prootic bone.

=== Postcrania ===
Members of Caturidae are large fish with genera like Caturus commonly reaching up to a meter in length. They have elongate, fusiform bodies with a single triangular dorsal fin posterior to the middle of the body and hemiheterocercal caudal fin. Elasmiod scales are present along the body, similar to Amia. In both groups, these scales possess ridges and rods arranged to overlap one another though this may be a convergent scale morphology between the two groups. Their vertebral column was made up of 25-30 abdominal vertebrae along with 17-19 displospondylous caudal vertebrae. Within the caudal fin, the ural neural arches are blocky and there are 11-14 hypurals.

== Classification ==
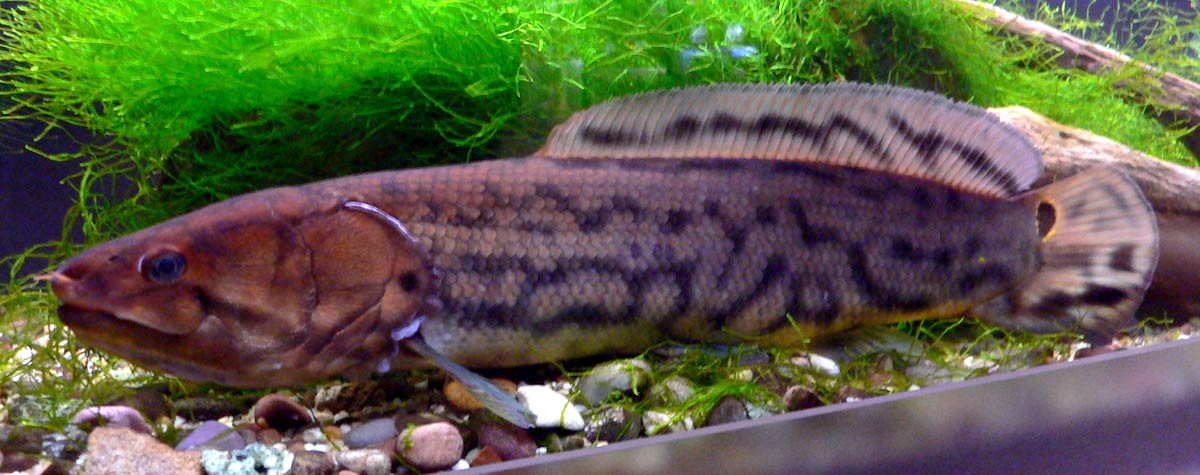
Amia is the only living amiiform and a representative of the sister-group to Caturidae.

Caturidae has always been found either within or sister to Amiiforms with they family being placed near various groups such as Ophiopsidae. It is currently thought to be the sister-group to Amiidae. This being due to the shared trait of a double jaw articulation which involves the articular, symplectic, and quadrate bones. Along with this, both families incorporate the dermosphenotic bone into their skull roofs. Even with these similarities, the lack of features in the caudal region of the vertebral column place caturids outside Amiidae itself. Outside of the modern family, Caturidae has also been more recently suggested to be closely related to Liodesmidae. These two families, along with a few other genera currently make up the Caturoidea. Below is a cladogram from Lambers (1995) showing the relation between Caturidae and other Halecomorphs.

- - Watsonulus
  - - - Oshunia
      - Ionoscopus
    - - - - - - Teoichthys
              - Ophiopsis
            - - Osteorachis
              - Macrepistius
          - Heterolepidotes
        - Furo
      - - - Calamopleurus
          - - - Vidalamia
              - Amiopsis
            - - Sinamia
              - - Pachyamia
                - Amia
        - - Caturus
          - Amblysemius

== Evolutionary history ==
The oldest described caturid specimen is dated to the lower Upper Triassic and is located in the Río Negro province, Argentina. This specimen has not been assigned to a genus though the differences in its teeth suggests that it can not be assigned to any of the genera currently known. Though it have been said to be found in the freshwater deposits of the Vera Formation, revisions relating to the discovery of the specimen may suggest that it was not found within the Los Menucos group. Another Triassic genus, Eugnathus, has been found in the Norian of Austria and is very similar anatomically to Caturus. Most taxa within the family, such as Caturus and Strobilodus, lived during the Jurassic period with most named species being from the Late Jurassic. During this time, caturids and other caturiods were located within the western Tethys sea only to spread westward through the Paleo-Pacific along the Hispanic Corridor. The group has been suggested to have shown its greatest diversity in the Middle Jurassic after its radiation in the Early Jurassic.

The youngest more complete caturids are known from the Berriasian and Valanginian with fossils from this time being rare, suggesting a rapid decline in the diversity and range of the group. Though fragmentary, there are teeth assigned to caturids from Tunisia and Thailand which date to the Aptian-Albian, potentially extending the temporal range of the group.

== Paleoecology ==
As their body form suggests, caturids were predators of marine environments with them being some of the largest predators in lagoonal ecosystems during the Jurassic. Due to similarities in jaw morphology to modern marine fish like barracuda and gar, it has been suggested that at least some caturids were ambush predators that would have used long-distance striking. Regurgitalites that have been suggested to come from Caturus contain a variety of prey items such as cephalopods, fish, and crustaceans. There have also been more direct records of the diet of Caturus where it has been shown to have ate a number of smaller fish and belemnoid cephalopods. Material attributed to caturids have been found as gut contents, such as teeth found within a specimen of Belonostomus.

== Paleoenvironment ==
Just like a number of other early halecomorph groups, caturids were mostly found in marine environments, the freshwater environments that they have been found in were near marine seaways. Within marine environments, they lived in more nearshore and shallow-water settings including lagoons.
