= Bahia Group =

- Stratigraphic range: Valanginian–Hauterivian
- Type: Group
- Sub-units: Marfim Formation

Lithology
- Primary: Conglomerate

Location
- Coordinates: 12.9°S 38.5°W
- Approximate paleocoordinates: 12.7°S 5.7°W
- Region: Bahia
- Country: Brazil
- Extent: Recôncavo Basin

Type section
- Named for: Bahia
- Bahia Group (Brazil)

The Bahia Group, also known as Bahia Series, is an Early Cretaceous geologic group of the Recôncavo Basin in Bahia, Brazil dating back to the Valanginian and Hauterivian. Dinosaur remains are among the fossils that have been recovered from unit, including those of the ornithopod Tietasaura from the Marfim Formation. The conglomerates were deposited in an estuarine environment.

== Fossil content ==
Color key: Taxon / Reclassified taxon / Taxon falsely reported as present / Dubious taxon or junior synonym / Ichnotaxon / Ootaxon / Morphotaxon	Notes; Uncertain or tentative taxa are in small text; ~~crossed out~~ taxa are discredited.

=== Ornithopods ===
Ornithopods of the Bahia Group
Genus	Species	Location	Stratigraphic position	Material	Notes	Images
Iguanodontia indet.	Indeterminate					
Tietasaura	T. derbyiana				A elasmarian ornithopod	

=== Sauropods ===
Sauropods of the Bahia Group
Genus	Species	Location	Stratigraphic position	Material	Notes	Images
Diplodocidae indet.	Indeterminate					
Lithostrotia indet.	Indeterminate					

=== Theropods ===
Theropods of the Bahia Group
Genus	Species	Location	Stratigraphic position	Material	Notes	Images
Carcharodontosauria indet.	Indeterminate			Vertebrae		
Spinosauridae indet.	Indeterminate					
Tyrannosauroidea? indet.	Indeterminate					

=== Pterosaurs ===
Pterosaurs of the Bahia Group
Genus	Species	Location	Stratigraphic position	Material	Notes	Images
Anhangueridae indet.	Indeterminate					

=== Crocodylomorphs ===
Crocodylomorphs of the Bahia Group
Genus	Species	Location	Stratigraphic position	Material	Notes	Images
Sarcosuchus	S. hartti				A pholidosaurid crocodyliform	
"Thoracosaurus"	"T. bahiensis"				A gavialoid crocodilian	

=== Turtles ===
Turtles of the Bahia Group
Genus	Species	Location	Stratigraphic position	Material	Notes	Images
Testudines indet.	Indeterminate					

=== Fish ===
Fishes of the Bahia Group
Genus	Species	Location	Stratigraphic position	Material	Notes	Images
Acrodus	A. nitidus				A acrodontid hybodont	
"Belonostomus"	''B." carinatus				A aspidorhynchid fish	
Calamopleurus	C. mawsoni				A amiid fish	
Ellimmichthys	E. longicostatum				A ellimmichthyiform fish	
Ellimmichthys	E. spinosus				A ellimmichthyiform fish	
Lepidotes	L. spp.				A lepidotid fish	
Mawsonia	M. gigas				A mawsoniid coelacanth	
Scrombroclupeoides	S. scutata				A clupeomorph fish	
Scutatuspinosus	S. itapagipensis				A ellimmichthyiform fish	

=== Molluscs ===
==== Bivalves ====
Bivalves of the Bahia Group
Genus	Species	Location	Stratigraphic position	Material	Notes	Images
Anhapoa	A. munizi				A iridinid bivalve	
Duplexium	D. jatobensis				A iridinid bivalve	

== See also ==
- List of dinosaur-bearing stratigraphic units
