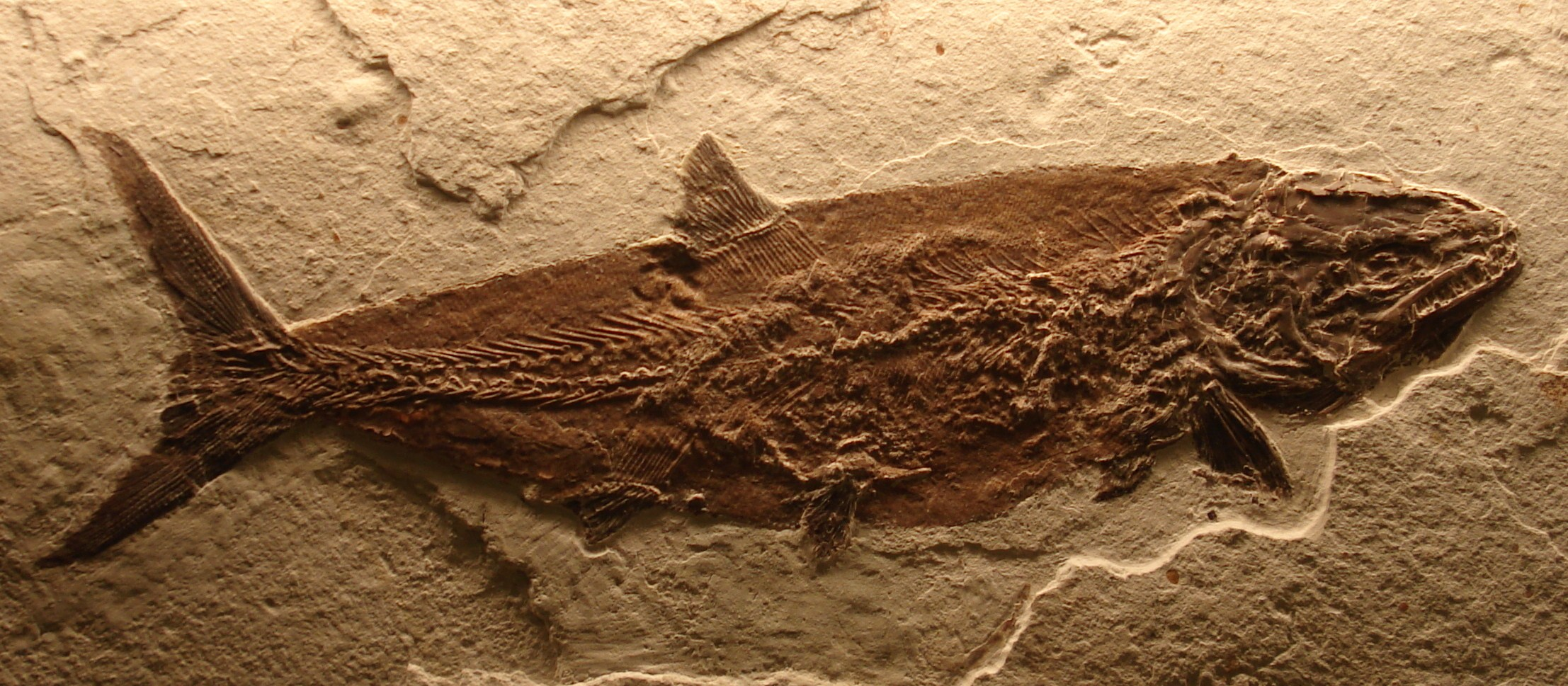
- Fossil specimen
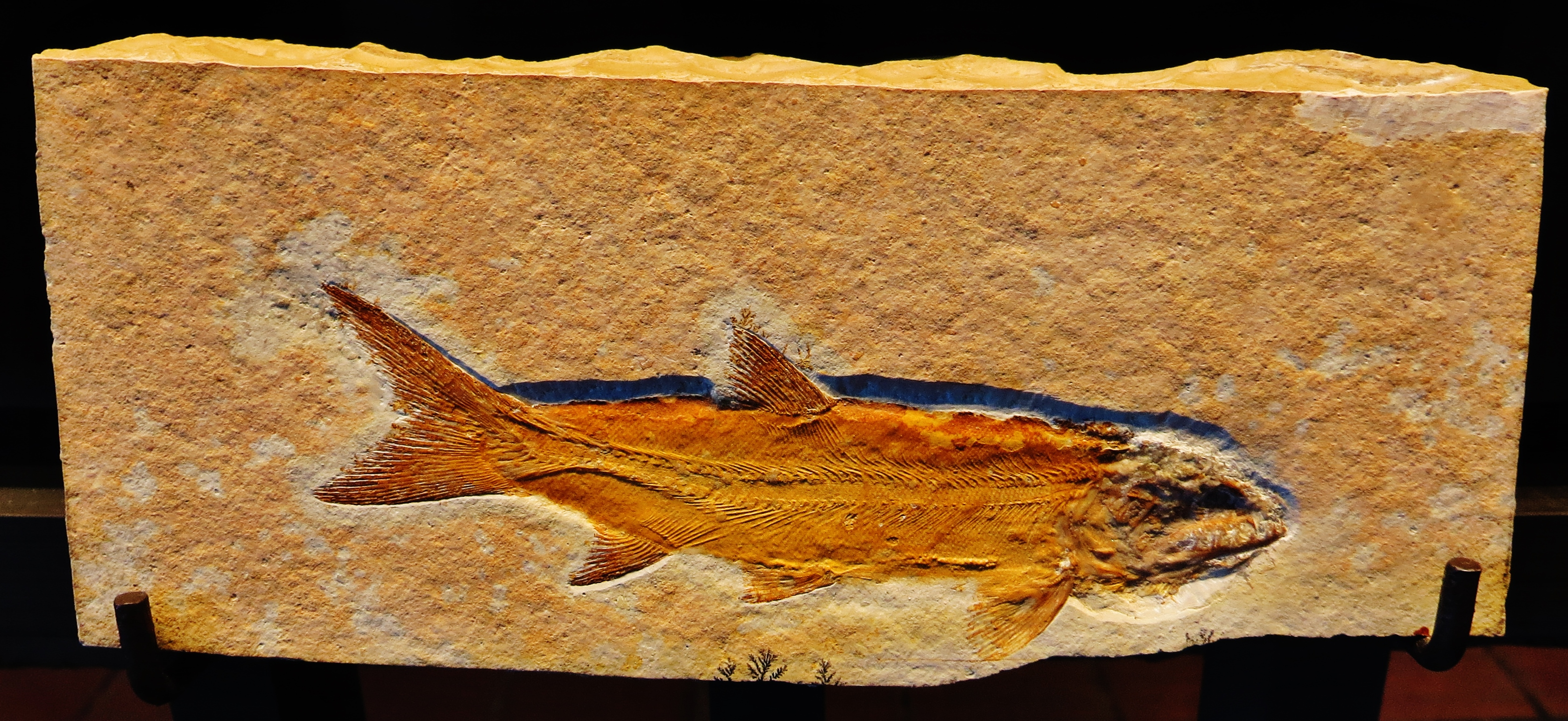
- Amblysemius bellicianus

Scientific classification
- Kingdom: Animalia
- Phylum: Chordata
- Class: Actinopterygii
- Clade: Halecomorphi
- Order: Amiiformes
- Family: †Caturidae
- Genus: †Amblysemius; Agassiz, 1844

Type species
- Amblysemius bellicianus Thiollière, 1851

= Amblysemius =

Amblysemius Temporal range: Late Jurassic

Extinct genus of fish

Amblysemius is an extinct genus of amiiform fish belonging to the family Caturidae. This genus lived during the Late Jurassic period.

== Taxonomy ==
There are two species that have been found to be in this genus:

1. Amblysemius bellicianus (type species)
2. Amblysemius pachyurus

There is some confusion on this genus with species of questionable validity such as Amblysemius gracilis (see "Taxonomic history"). Some such as Saint-Seine consider species within this genus (A. bellicianus) to be part of genus Caturus instead. However Saint-Seine erroneously mistook the specimen MHNL 20015172 for the holotype specimen MHNL 20015164 thus making his assessment invalid.

=== Taxonomic history ===
The genus was erected in 1844 by Louis Agassiz, a prominent Swiss-American biologist, however the contents of the genus was unknown as he did not name a species. Later he would mention "Amblysemius gracilis", though without a description of it making it fail the requirements of article 12 in the International Code of Zoological Nomenclature (ICZN) and making "A. gracilis" nomen nudum. However there is an unpublished artwork by Charles Weber of a specimen that was labelled "Amblysemius gracilis" but it is not accompanied by any information on the provenance of the fossil and there is no evidence that it could be the specimen Agassiz mentioned.

In 1851, Victor Thiollière, a paleoichthyologist, would describe the species Amblysemius bellicianus. It lived during the late Jurassic period (upper Kimmeridgian) in the lithographic limestones of Cerin, France. Because it was accompanied with a propor description, it was a valid name and it became the type species for the genus. While there is no illustration of the type specimen, there is a fossil of a fish in the Museum de Lyon that is labeled "Amblysemius bellicianus" (MHNL 20015164) from 1850 making it probably the specimen Thoilliere based the species on. Currently there are two species as mentioned above, A. bellicianus and A. pachyurus.
