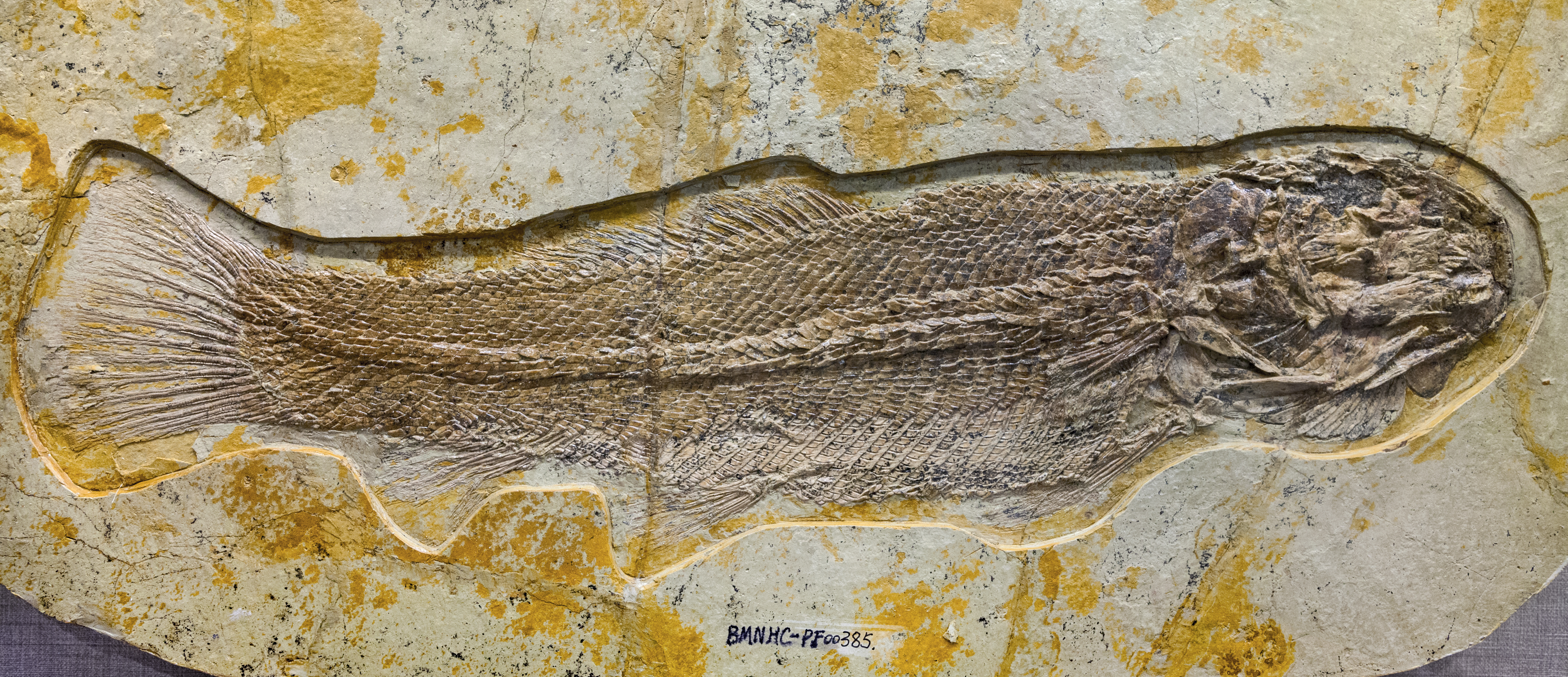
- Fossil specimen of Sinamia sp.

Scientific classification
- Kingdom: Animalia
- Phylum: Chordata
- Class: Actinopterygii
- Clade: Halecomorphi
- Order: Amiiformes
- Superfamily: Amioidea
- Family: †Sinamiidae; Berg, 1940

Genera
- Ikechaoamia; Siamamia; Sinamia; Khoratamia

= Sinamiidae =

Sinamiidae Temporal range: Early Cretaceous

Extinct family of ray-finned fishes

Sinamiidae is an extinct family of ray-finned fish. They are halecomorph fishes endemic to Early Cretaceous freshwater environments in East and Southeast Asia.

Along with Amiidae, it is one of two families that makes up the superfamily Amioidea. The two are distinguished by the shape of their scales. Some authors treat them as a subfamily, the Sinamiinae, within the Amiidae as the closest relatives of the modern subfamily Amiinae.
