= Maliamia =

Maliamia Temporal range: Eocene (Ypresian)

Scientific classification
- Domain: Eukaryota
- Kingdom: Animalia
- Phylum: Chordata
- Class: Actinopterygii
- Clade: Halecomorphi
- Order: Amiiformes
- Family: Amiidae
- Subfamily: †Vidalamiinae
- Genus: †Maliamia; Patterson and Longbottom, 1989
- Species: †M. gigas

Binomial name
- †Maliamia gigas Patterson and Longbottom, 1989

Extinct genus of ray-finned fishes

Maliamia ("Malian bowfin") is an extinct genus of amiid ray-finned fish from the Early Eocene, known from fragmentary remains found in the Tamaguélelt Formation of Mali. It was described in 1989, based on fossils recovered by three separate expeditions in 1975, 1979–80, and 1981. The type species is Maliamia gigas, named in reference to its large size.

Maliamia is currently the youngest known member of Vidalamiinae, an extinct group of bowfin fish that lived from the Early Cretaceous to the Early Eocene.

== Description ==
Maliamia gigas is known from isolated jaw remains including premaxillae, vomers, maxillae, and dentaries. These fragments lack teeth due to post-mortem wear, but empty tooth sockets remain, and their arrangement implies that M. gigas had a single row of teeth.

Estimates put the body length of M. gigas between 1.8 (based on Calamopleurus) and 3.5 meters (based on Amia), making it the largest known member of Vidalamiinae.

== Paleoenvironment ==
Fossils of Maliamia are known from shallow marine phosphorites. During the Eocene, much of northwest Africa was covered by the Trans-Saharan Seaway, an inland sea estimated to have been approximately 50 meters deep. Global temperatures and the sea level were higher than they are today, and Maliamia lived in warm, tropical waters. Other fishes from its environment included Pycnodus jonesae, Lavocatodus giganteus, Myliobatis wurnoensis, Stratodus apicalis, Nigerium tamaguelense, and Brychaetus sp. Additionally, it shared its environment with reptiles such as the giant marine snake Palaeophis colossaeus which was, like Maliamia, among the biggest species in its clade. As sea levels rose and fell throughout the Late Cretaceous and early Paleogene, the Trans-Saharan Seaway of Mali experienced intermittent isolation from major seas, which may have made the ecosystem an aquatic center for endemism where organisms like Maliamia and Palaeophis were selected for gigantism.
