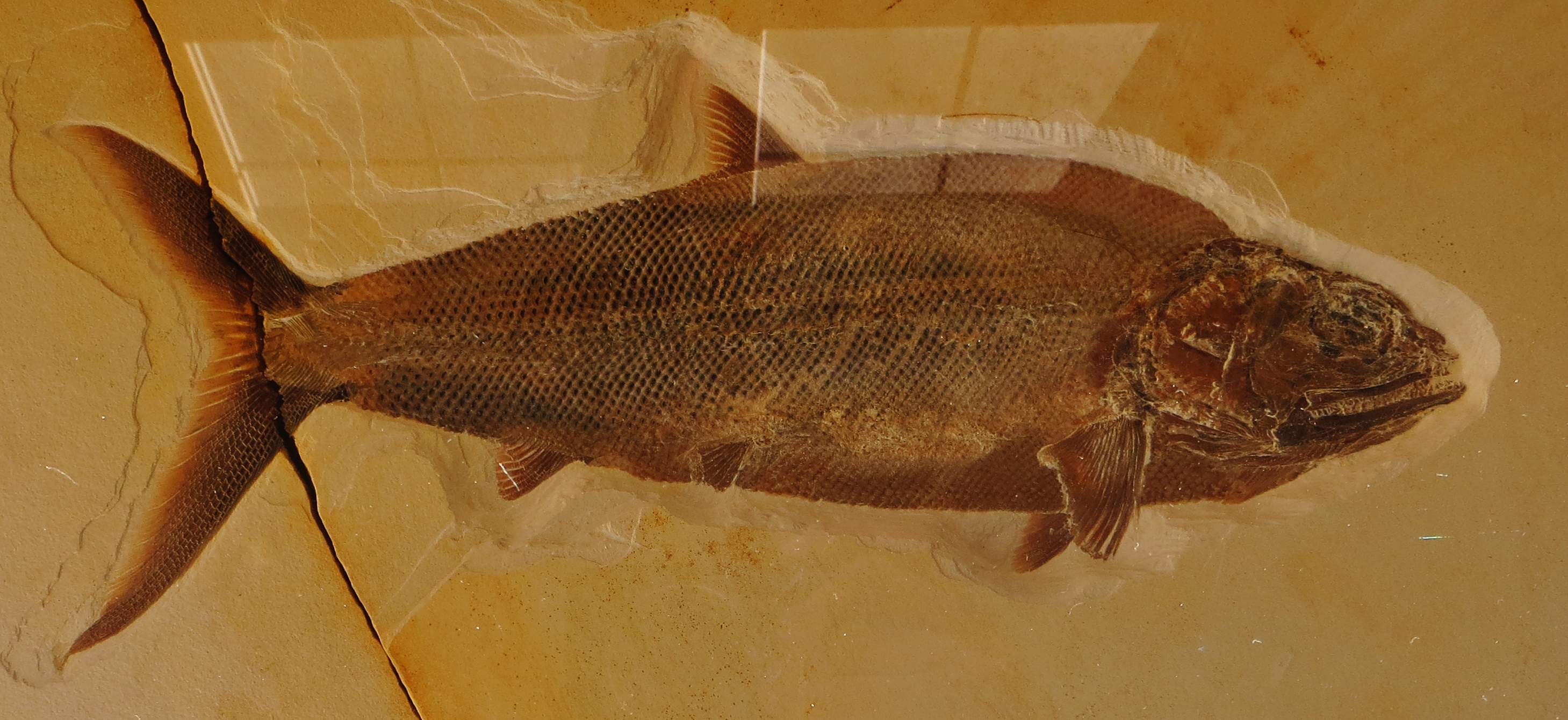
- Fossil specimen of C. furcatus from Germany, Upper Jurassic
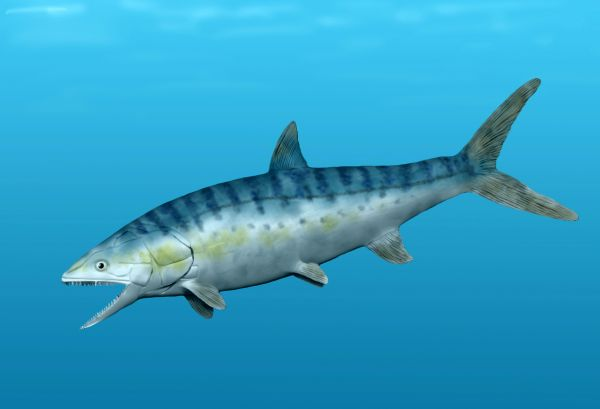
- Life restoration

Scientific classification
- Kingdom: Animalia
- Phylum: Chordata
- Class: Actinopterygii
- Clade: Halecomorphi
- Order: Amiiformes
- Family: †Caturidae
- Genus: †Caturus; Agassiz, 1843

Type species
- †Pachycormus furcatus Agassiz, 1833

Species
- See text

Synonyms
- †Uraeus Agassiz, 1832

= Caturus =

Caturus Temporal range: Early Jurassic-Early Cretaceous, 200–140 Ma

Extinct genus of fishes

Caturus (from Greek: κατω kato, 'down' and Greek: οὐρά ourá 'tail') is an extinct genus of predatory marine fishes in the family Caturidae in the order Amiiformes, related to modern bowfin. It has been suggested that the genus is non-monophyletic with respect to other caturid genera.

Fossils of this genus range from 200 to 140 mya (Early Jurassic to Early Cretaceous).

== Taxonomy ==
Caturus has a confused taxonomic history. The genus was originally described by Louis Agassiz for two fossil fish (U. pachyurus and U. gracilis) that had been previously described in the genus Uraeus, which was found to already be preoccupied by a genus of cobra of the same name (now classified as a subgenus within Naja). However, neither of these species were properly described with an associated illustration or proper description, and they remain nomina dubia; the specimen of U. pachyurus is lost, and the specimen of Caturus gracilis is too poorly-preserved to assign a specific taxon. Later, the species C. furcatus, initially described by Agassiz within Pachycormus, was designated as the type species of the genus by Woodward, but this was incorrect as the type species of a genus must be one of the species originally described for it. These inconsistencies make both Caturus and Pachycormus (which was initially described with Uraeus gracilis as one of its species) taxonomically unstable genera, necessitating a petition to the Bulletin of Zoological Nomenclature to retain C. furcatus as the type species of Caturus.

== Species ==
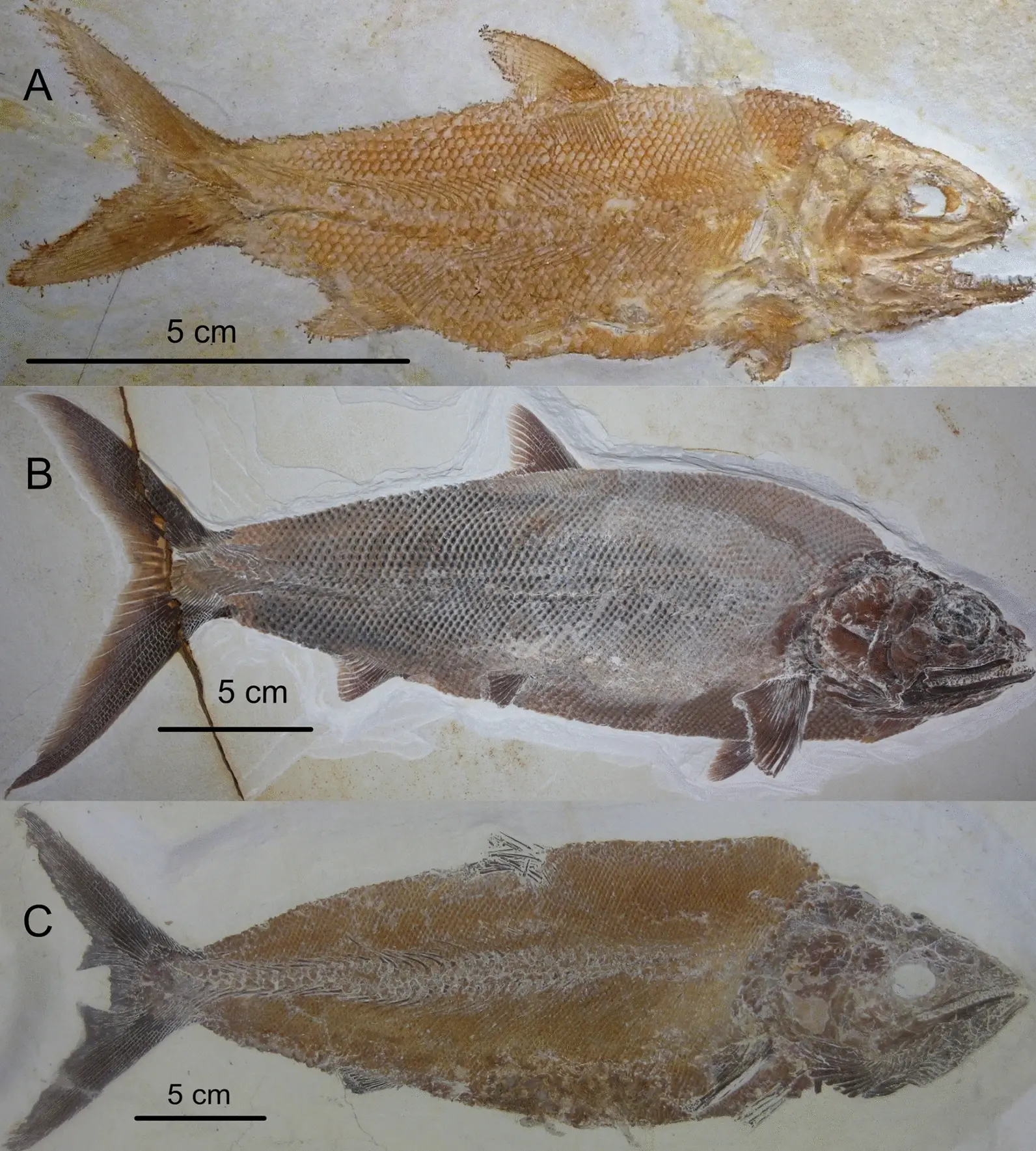
A: C. latus, B: C. furcatus, C: C. enkopicaudalis

The following species are known:

- †C. agassizi (Egerton, 1858) - Early Jurassic (Hettangian/Sinemurian) of England (Blue Lias)
- †C. brevicostatus Münster, 1842 - Late Jurassic (Kimmeridgian to Tithonian) of Germany (Solnhofen Formation) (=Liodesmus gracilis (Agassiz, 1838) (in part))
- †C. chirotes (Agassiz, 1839) - Early Jurassic (Hettangian/Sinemurian) of England (Blue Lias) (=Conodus ferox Agassiz, 1844)
- †C. dartoni Eastman, 1899 - Middle Jurassic (Bathonian) of North Dakota (Sundance Formation)
- †C. deani Gregory, 1923 - Oxfordian of Cuba (Jagua Formation)
- †C. enkopicaudalis Ebert & López-Arbarello, 2025 - Late Jurassic (Kimmeridgian & Tithonian) of Germany (Nusplingen Limestone & Solnhofen Formation)
- †C. ferox Winkler, 1862- Late Jurassic (Tithonian) of Germany (Solnhofen Formation)
- †C. furcatus (Agassiz, 1833) - Late Jurassic (Kimmeridgian) of Germany (Solnhofen Formation)
- †C. heterurus (Agassiz, 1839) - Early Jurassic (Hettangian/Sinemurian) of England (Blue Lias) (=C. bucklandi Agassiz, 1844)
- †C. latipennis (Agassiz, 1844) - Early Jurassic (Hettangian/Sinemurian) of England (Blue Lias)
- †C. latus Münster, 1834 - Late Jurassic (Tithonian) of Germany (Solnhofen Formation) (=C. cyprinoides Wagner, 1863)
- †C. macrurus Agassiz, 1833 - Late Jurassic (Kimmeridgian) of Germany (Solnhofen Formation)
- †C. porteri Rayner, 1948 - Middle Jurassic (Callovian) of England (Oxford Clay)
- †C. purbeckensis (Woodward, 1890) - Early Cretaceous (Berriasian) of England (Purbeck Group)
- †C. smithwoodwardi White, 1925 - Early Jurassic (Toarcian) of Germany (Posidonia Shale)
- †C. tarraconensis Sauvage, 1903 - Early Cretaceous (Berriasian/Valanginian) of Spain (La Pedrera de Rúbies Formation)
- †C. tenuidens Woodward, 1895 - Early Cretaceous (Berriasian) of England (Purbeck Group)

A number of species are no longer recognized. The species C. angustus Agassiz, 1844, C. branchiostegus Agassiz, 1834, C. contractus Wagner, 1863, C. driani Thiollière, 1851, C. elongatus Agassiz, 1834, C. gracilis Wagner, 1863, C. maximus Agassiz, 1834, C. microchirus Agassiz, 1834 and C. pleiodus Agassiz, 1844 are considered nomina dubia, while C. fusiformis Wagner, 1863 is considered a nomen nudum. The species C. stenospondylus Sauvage, 1875, C. stenoura Sauvage, 1875, and C. chaperi Sauvage, 1883 are all considered synonyms of Pachycormus macropterus, while C. cotteaui Sauvage, 1875 is considered a synonym of Euthynotus intermedius. The species C. retrodorsalis Sauvage, 1891 has been reclassified in Pholidophorus. Other species such as C. giganteus (Wagner, 1851) have been reclassified into other genera within the family Caturidae, such as Strobilodus. The species C. brevis Winkler, 1862, C. latidens Woodward, 1918, and C. velifer Thiollière, 1851, are no longer classified in Caturus or even Caturidae, and are yet to be reclassified.

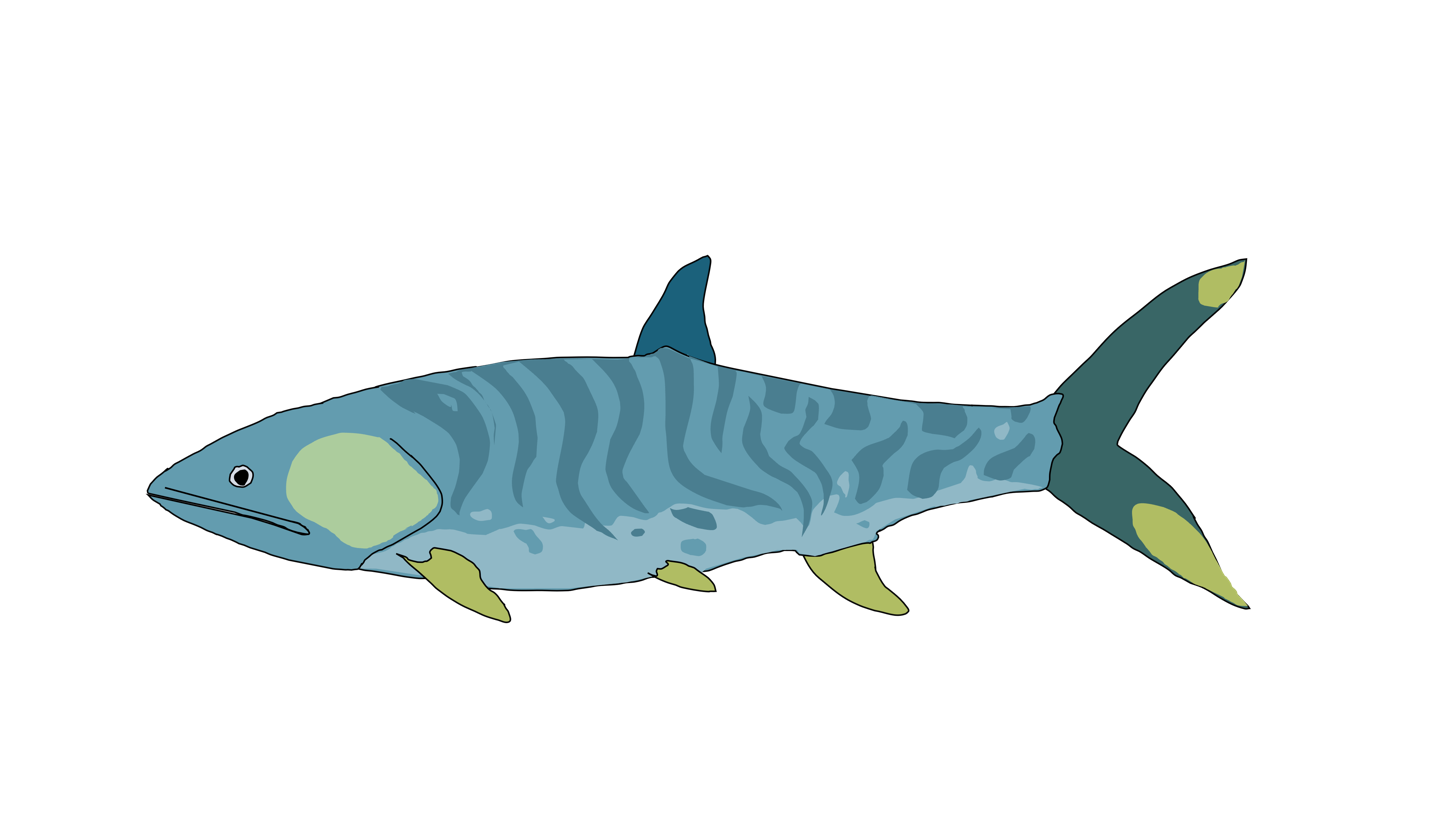
Life restoration of C. smithwoodwardi

The species C. insignis from the Triassic of Austria, formerly placed in Caturus, is now placed in the genus Furo. Another potential record from Argentina is now placed as an indeterminate caturoid, possibly in the genus Catutoichthys.

== Distribution ==
When restricted to only definitive species, Caturus is present in the Jurassic of the United Kingdom, Germany, the United States, and Cuba, ranging into the earliest Cretaceous of the United Kingdom and Spain. Indeterminate remains are also known within this range from the Jurassic of France and Portugal.
