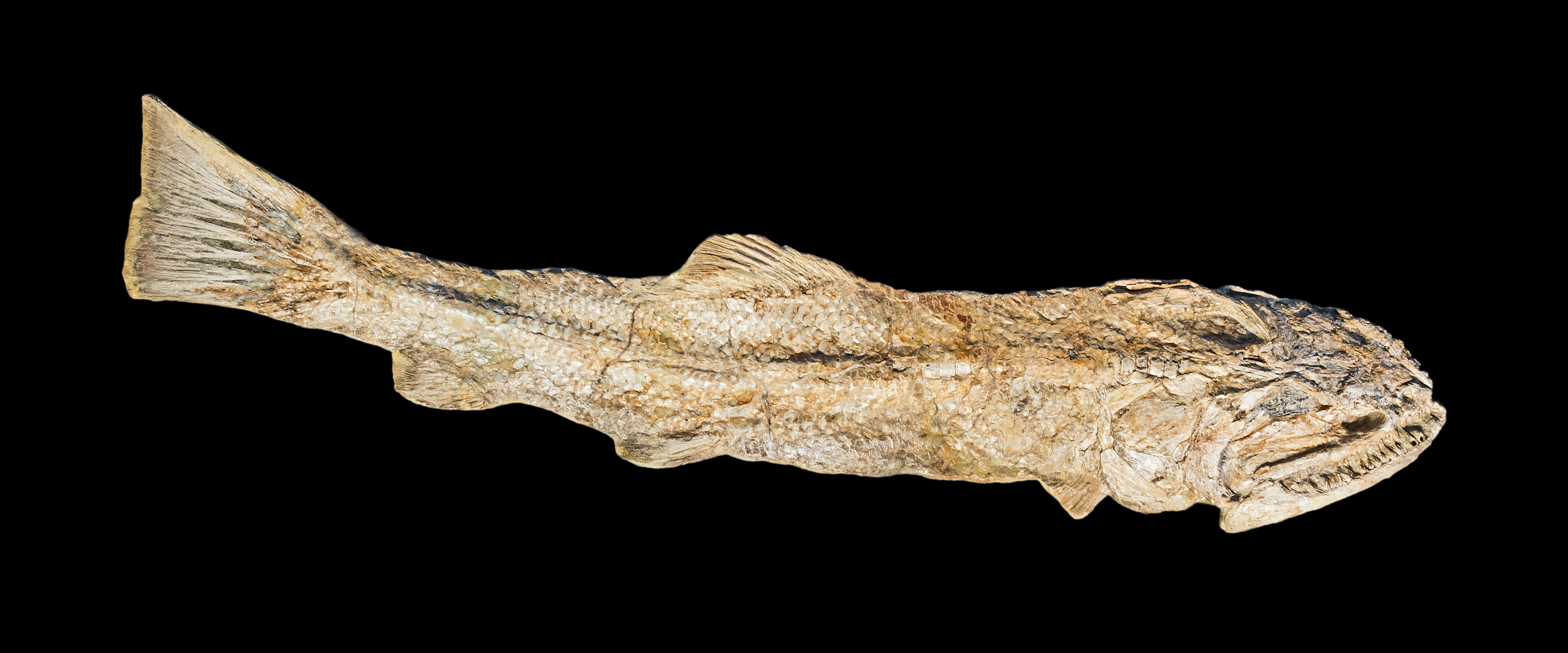
- Calamopleurus cylindricus
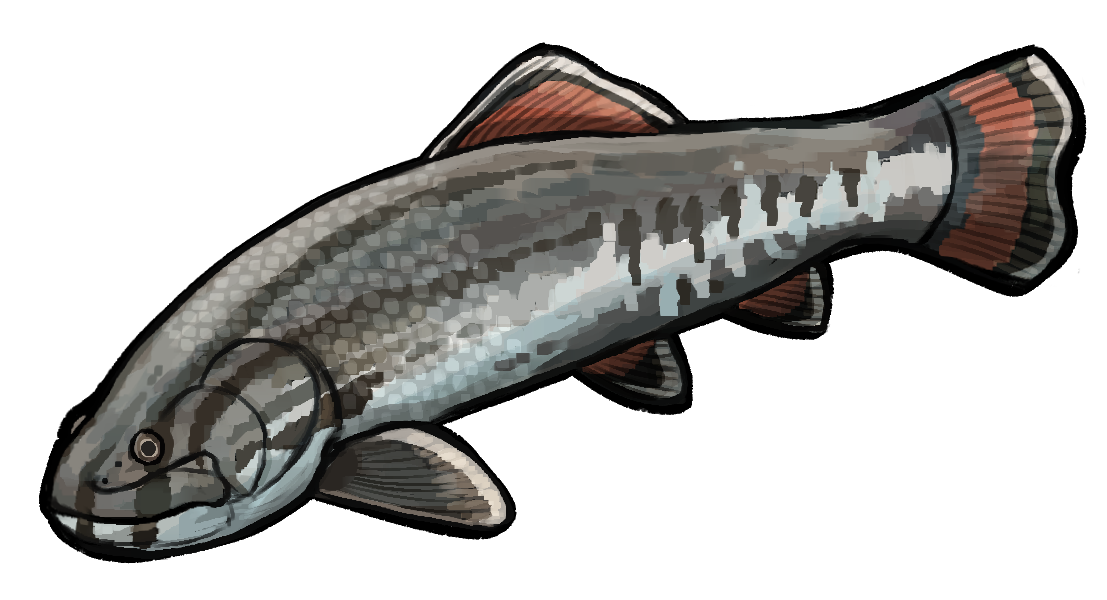
- Reconstruction of Calamopleurus cylindricus

Scientific classification
- Domain: Eukaryota
- Kingdom: Animalia
- Phylum: Chordata
- Class: Actinopterygii
- Clade: Halecomorphi
- Order: Amiiformes
- Family: Amiidae
- Subfamily: †Vidalamiinae
- Genus: †Calamopleurus; Agassiz, 1841

Type species
- Calamopleurus cylindricus Agassiz, 1841

Species
- See text

= Calamopleurus =

Calamopleurus Temporal range: Late Hauterivian to Early Cenomanian

Extinct genus of ray-finned fishes

Calamopleurus is a prehistoric genus of marine halecomorph ray-finned fish from the Early Cretaceous of South America and northern Africa. It was a relative of the modern bowfin, with both belonging to the family Amiidae. C. cylindricus was among the largest known amiids, rivaling the giant Paleocene bowfin Amia pattersoni in size. However, both were slightly smaller than Melvius and Amia basiloides, the two largest known amiids. It is one of the earliest known amiids to evolve a large body size.

== Taxonomy ==
It is thought Calamopleurus is a sister genus to Maliamia, the last surviving member of the vidalamiines, which is the largely marine amiid group that also contained Calamopleurus. Both are placed in the tribe Calamopleurini.

The genus contains three species:

- †C. africanus Forey & Grande, 1998 - Late Albian/Early Cenomanian of Morocco and Algeria
- †C. cylindricus Agassiz, 1841 - Late Aptian/Early Albian of Brazil (Crato and Santana Formations)
- †C. mawsoni Woodward, 1902 - Late Hauterivian/Early Barremian of Brazil (Bahia Group)

=== Calamopleurus africanus ===
This species lived in southern Morocco and Algeria during the Cretaceous period in the late Albian and early Cenomanian. It was described from fragmentary remains in the Kem Kem beds. Ossified dermopterotic ribs were inferred from a loose association between the dermosphenotic and the roof of the skull.

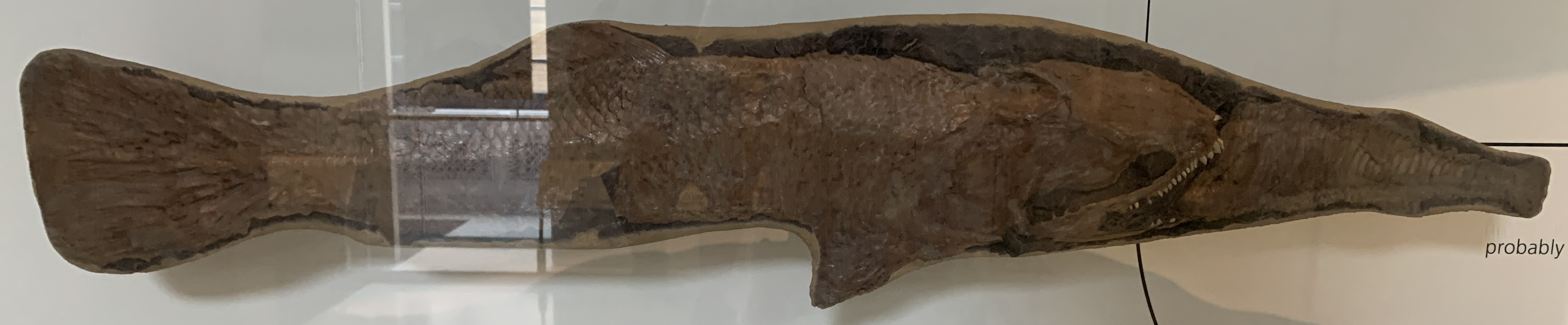
Cast of C. cylindricus with Vinctifer lodged in the pharynx.

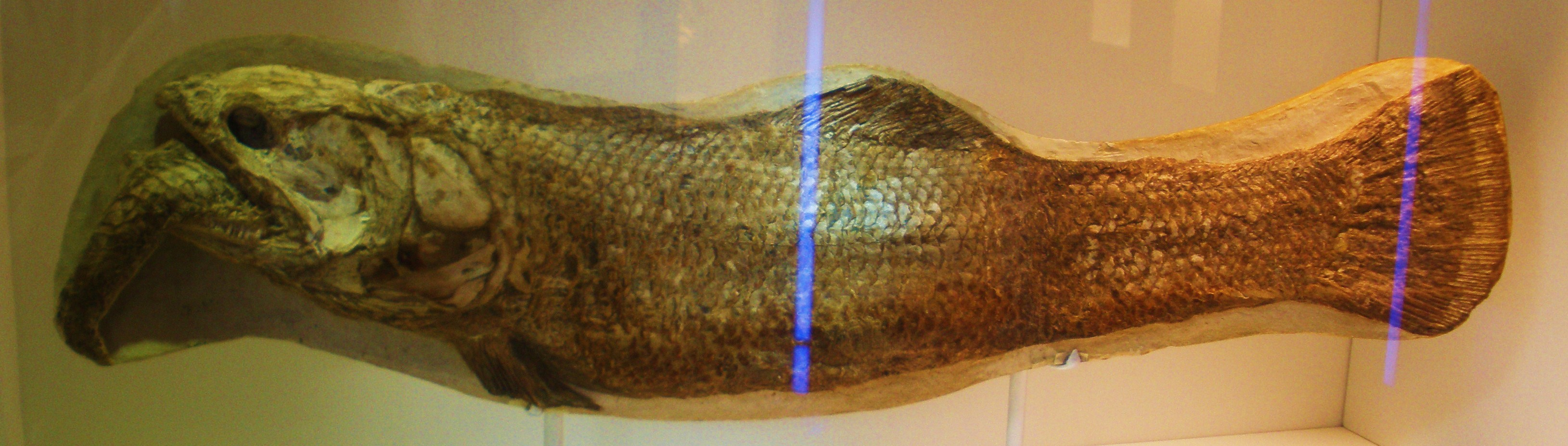
Fossil of Calamopleurus eating Rhacolepis
