= Tietasaura =

Tietasaura Temporal range: Early Cretaceous, Valanginian–Hauterivian
- Skeletal reconstruction (known material in white)

Scientific classification
- Domain: Eukaryota
- Kingdom: Animalia
- Phylum: Chordata
- Clade: Dinosauria
- Clade: †Ornithischia
- Clade: †Ornithopoda
- Clade: †Elasmaria
- Genus: †Tietasaura; Bandeira et al., 2024
- Species: †T. derbyiana

Binomial name
- †Tietasaura derbyiana Bandeira et al., 2024

Genus of ornithopod dinosaurs

Tietasaura (meaning "Tieta lizard") is an extinct genus of elasmarian ornithopod dinosaur from the Early Cretaceous Marfim Formation of Brazil. The genus contains a single species, T. derbyiana, known from a single incomplete femur. Tietasaura is notable for being the first ornithischian dinosaur ever named from Brazil.

== Discovery and naming ==
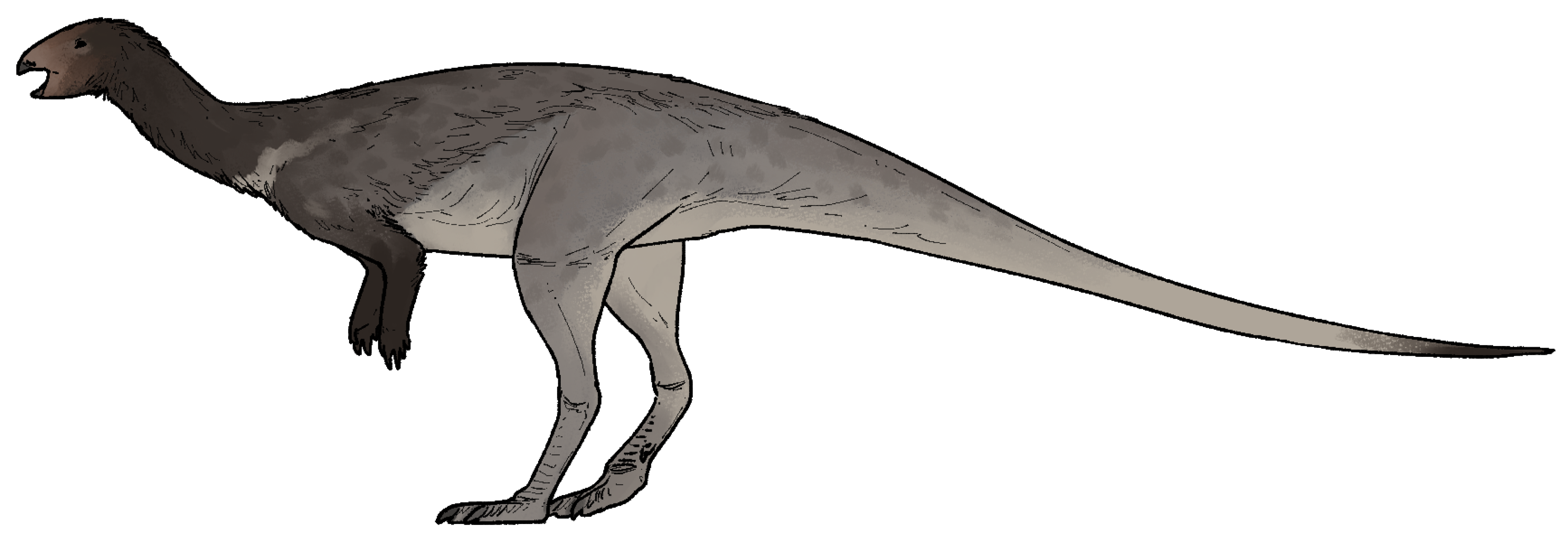
Life restoration

The Tietasaura holotype specimen, NHM-PV R.3424, was discovered in 1906 during a series of expeditions by London's Natural History Museum to South America, lasting from 1859 to 1906. Some of the fossils found during these trips were described in publications in 1860 and 1907. This particular fieldwork was conducted along a beach near the Bahia-São Francisco Railway in the city of Salvador in Bahia, Brazil. This locality belongs to the Marfim Formation of the Recôncavo Basin. The specimen, which consists of the distal end of left femur, is among the first dinosaur remains found in South America. While it is now confidently regarded as belonging to a dinosaur, early observations labeled the bone as belonging to "Hyposaurus sp." (a dyrosaurid crocodyliform) in the collections of the Natural History Museum, and the museum's digital collections inaccurately list it as a specimen of Sarcosuchus hartti (a pholidosaurid crocodyliform).

In 2024, Bandeira et al. described Tietasaura derbyiana as a new genus and species of elasmarian ornithopod based on these fossil remains. The generic name, Tietasaura, combines "Tieta"—the name of the main character in the Brazilian novel Tieta do Agreste—and "saura" (σαύρα), the feminine declination of the Greek word "sauros", meaning "lizard". The name "Tieta" is also a nickname for "Antonieta" in Portuguese, which means "priceless"; the describing authors use this meaning to reflect the specimen's value as the first ornithischian named from Brazil. The specific name, derbyiana, honors geologist Orville A. Derby and his contributions to paleontology in Brazil.

== Classification ==
In their phylogenetic analyses, Bandeira et al. (2024) recovered Tietasaura as an ornithopod member of the Elasmaria, as the sister taxon to Notohypsilophodon. Their results are displayed in the cladogram below:

- Clypeodonta
  - Hypsilophodon
  - - Elasmaria
      - Kangnasaurus
      - Macrogryphosaurus
      - Anabisetia
      - Talenkauen
      - Morrosaurus
      - Trinisaura
      - - Fulgurotherium
        - Gasparinisaura
        - - Tietasaura
          - Notohypsilophodon
    - Iguanodontia
      - Rhabdodon
      - Zalmoxes spp.
      - - Tenontosaurus spp.
        - - Muttaburrasaurus
          - Dryomorpha
