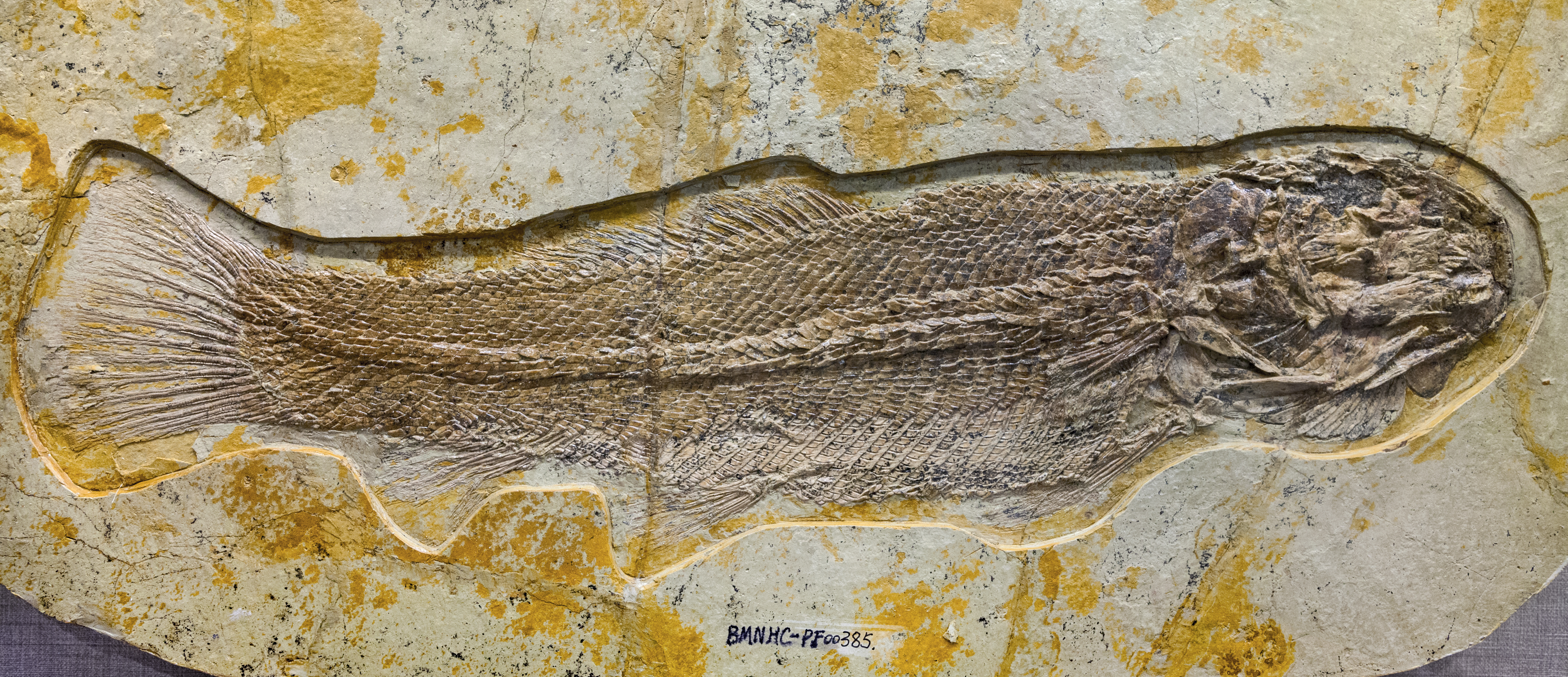
- Fossil specimen

Scientific classification
- Kingdom: Animalia
- Phylum: Chordata
- Class: Actinopterygii
- Clade: Halecomorphi
- Order: Amiiformes
- Family: Amiidae
- Subfamily: †Sinamiinae
- Genus: †Sinamia; Stensiö, 1935

= Sinamia =

Sinamia Temporal range: Early Cretaceous

Extinct genus of ray-finned fishes

Sinamia is an extinct genus of freshwater amiiform fish which existed in China, Japan, South Korea and North Korea during the Early Cretaceous period. Like the related bowfin, it has an elongated low-running dorsal fin, though this was likely convergently evolved.

== Taxonomy ==
After

- Sinamia zdanskyi Stensiö, 1935 Meng-Yin Formation, Shangdong, China, Early Cretaceous
- Sinamia huananensis Su, 1973 Yangtang Formation, Anhui, China, Early Cretaceous
- Sinamia chinhuaensis Wei, 1976 Guantou Formation, Zhejiang, China, Early Cretaceous
- Sinamia luozigouensis Li, 1984 Luozigou Formation, Jilin, China, Early Cretaceous
- Sinamia meemanniana Liu & Zhang, 2026 Dalazi Formation, Jilin, China, Early Cretaceous
- Sinamia poyangica Su and Li, 1990 Shixi Formation, Jiangxi, China, Early Cretaceous
- Sinamia liaoningensis Zhang, 2012 Yixian Formation, Jiufotang Formation, Liaoning, China, Early Cretaceous (Aptian)
- Sinamia kukurihime Yabumoto, 2014 Kuwajima Formation, Ishikawa, Japan, Early Cretaceous (Barremian)
- Sinamia lanzhoensis Peng, Murray, Brinkman, Zhang & You, 2015 Hekou Group, Gansu, China, Early Cretaceous
