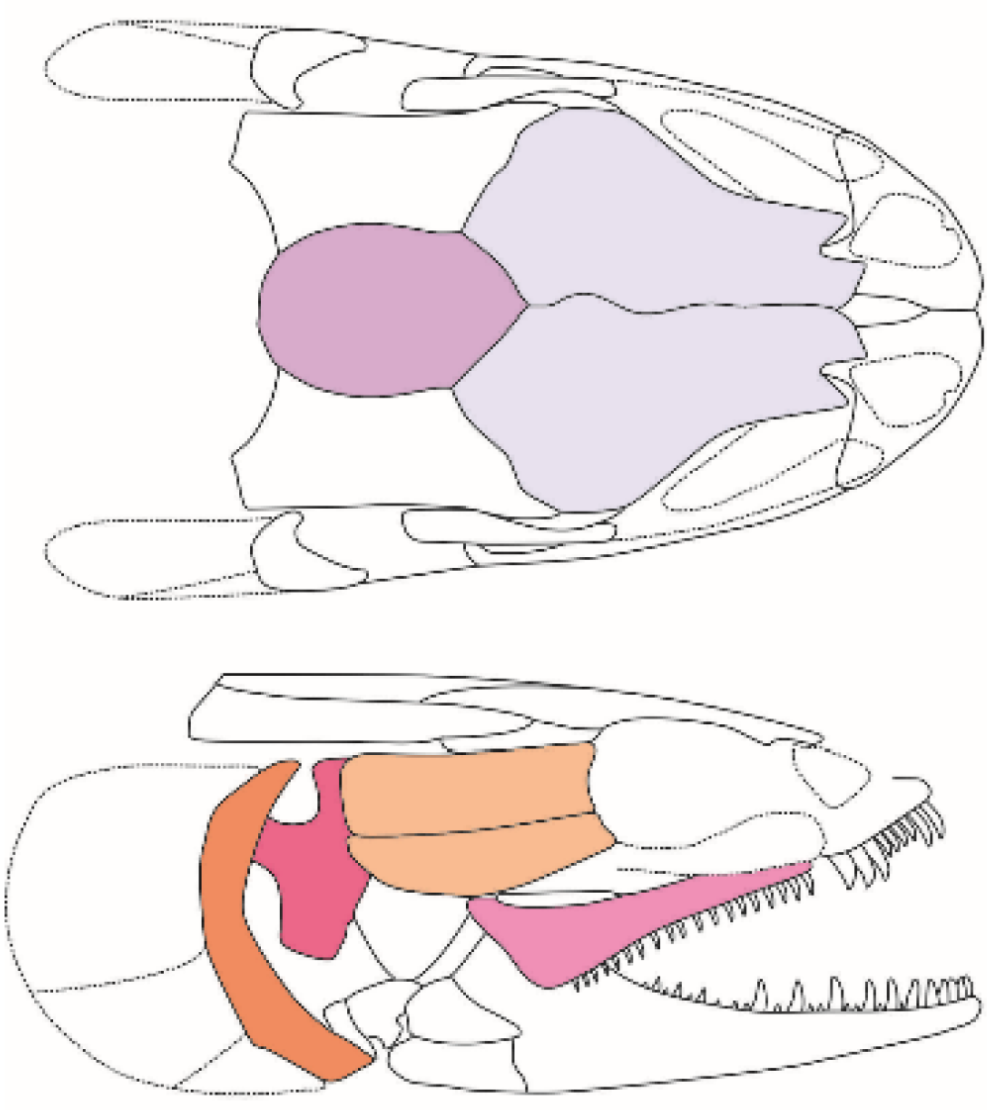
- Skull reconstruction

Scientific classification
- Kingdom: Animalia
- Phylum: Chordata
- Class: Actinopterygii
- Clade: Halecomorphi
- Order: Amiiformes
- Family: Amiidae
- Genus: †Siamamia; Cavin et al., 2007
- Species: †S. naga

Binomial name
- †Siamamia naga Cavin et al., 2007

= Siamamia =

Siamamia naga

Extinct genus of ray-finned fishes

Siamamia (meaning "Siam Amia") is an extinct genus of ray-finned fish in the family Amiidae. They are halecomorph fishes endemic to Early Cretaceous freshwater environments from north-eastern Thailand.

Siamamia fossils have been found in the Early Cretaceous Sao Khua Formation, present-day in Phu Phok, Sakhon Nakhon Province, Thailand.
