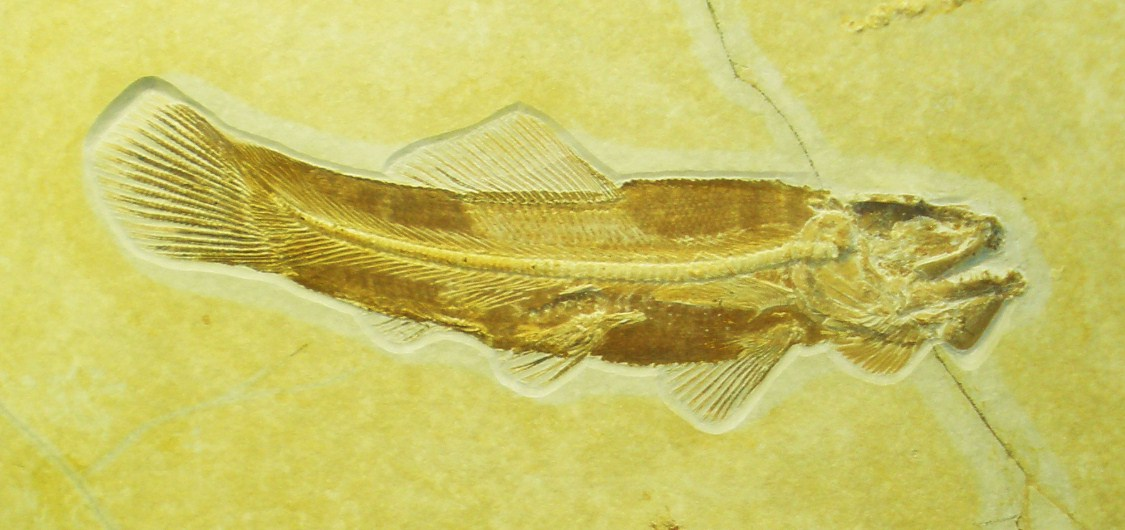
- Amiopsis lepidota

Scientific classification
- Kingdom: Animalia
- Phylum: Chordata
- Class: Actinopterygii
- Clade: Halecomorphi
- Order: Amiiformes
- Family: Amiidae
- Subfamily: †Amiopsinae; Grande and Bemis, 1998
- Genus: †Amiopsis; Kner, 1863

Type species
- Amiopsis prisca Kner, 1863

Synonyms
- Urocles

= Amiopsis =

Amiopsis Temporal range: Tithonian–Cenomanian

Extinct genus of ray-finned fishes

Amiopsis is an extinct genus of freshwater and marine ray-finned fish belonging to the family Amiidae, making it closely related to the modern bowfin. Fossils are known from the Late Jurassic Solnhofen Limestone, Germany (A. lepidota), the Early Cretaceous Purbeck Group, England (A. damoni), La Pedrera de Rúbies Formation, Spain (A. woodwardi) and Bernnissant Iguanodon locality, Belgium (A. dolloi) and the Late Cretaceous (Cenomanian) of the Balkans (A. prisca type species). The monophyly of the genus is questionable, due to it being based on a single character, "the presence of three or more lateral fossae on each side of most abdominal centra". Remains previously assigned to this genus from the Early Cretaceous Las Hoyas, Spain have been moved into the new genus Hispanamia.
