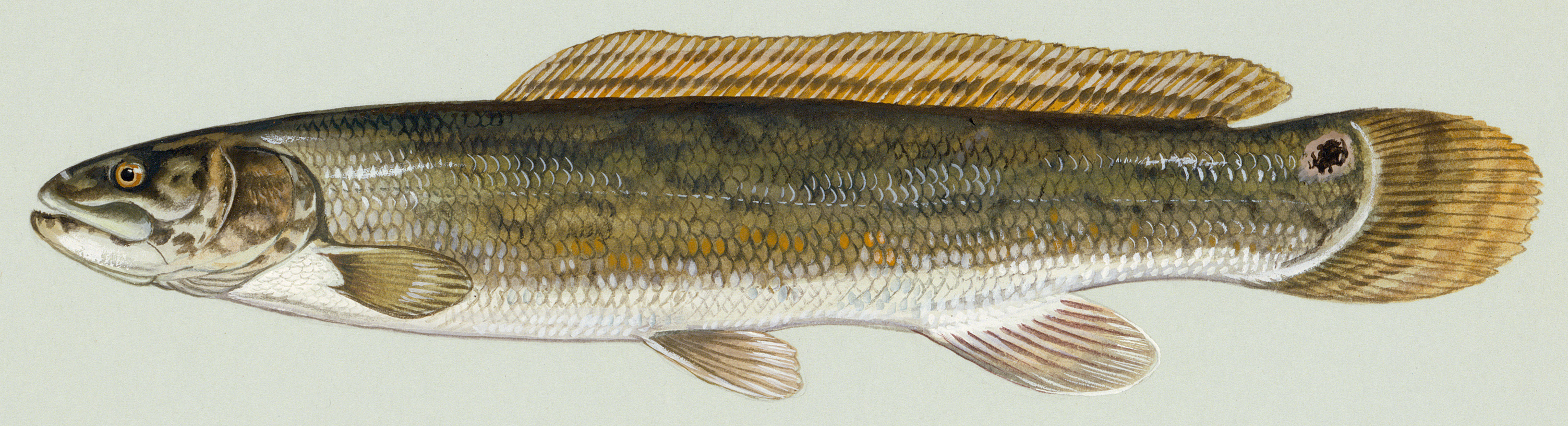
- Extant bowfin Amia calva (Amiidae)
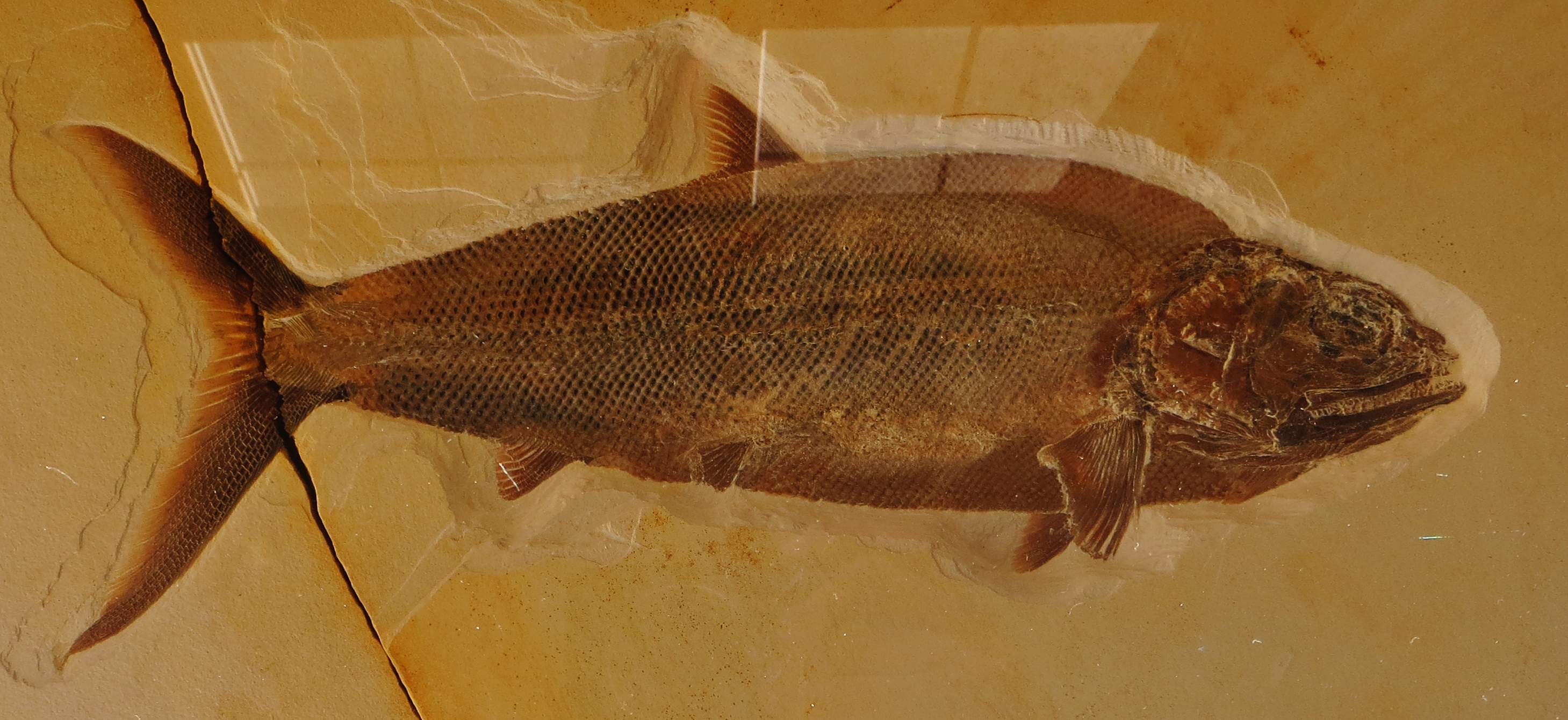
- Caturus (Caturidae) Late Jurassic, Germany

Scientific classification
- Kingdom: Animalia
- Phylum: Chordata
- Class: Actinopterygii
- Infraclass: Holostei
- Clade: Halecomorphi
- Order: Amiiformes; O. P. Hay, 1929

Type species
- Amia calva Linnaeus, 1766

Families
- See text

= Amiiformes =

Amiiformes Temporal range: Triassic–Recent

Order of fishes

The Amiiformes /ˈæmi.ɪfɔːrmiːz/ order of fish has only two extant species, the bowfins: Amia calva and Amia ocellicauda, the latter recognized as a separate species in 2022. These Amiiformes are found in the freshwater systems of North America, in the United States and parts of southern Canada. They live in freshwater streams, rivers, and swamps. The order first appeared in the Triassic, and the extinct members include both marine and freshwater species, many of which are morphologically disparate from bowfins, such as the caturids.

== Evolution and diversity ==
The extinct species of the Amiiformes can be found as fossils in Asia and Europe, but the bowfin is the last living species in the order. Amiiformes is therefore the last surviving order of Halecomorphi, the clade to which the bowfin and its fossil relatives belong. Other orders, such as the Parasemionotiformes, are all extinct.

Halecomorphs, and its sister group Ginglymodi, belong to Holostei. Holosteans are the sister group of teleosteans, the group to which nearly all (i.e., 96%) living fishes belong to. Holosteans and Teleosts form a clade called Neopterygii. The following cladogram summarizes the evolutionary relationships of living and fossil Halecomorphs, and other neopterygians.

- Neopterygii
  - Teleostei
  - Holostei
    - Ginglymodi (gars, alligator gars, and their fossil relatives)
    - Halecomorphi
      - †Parasemionotiformes
      - - †Panxianichthyiformes
        - - †Ionoscopiformes
          - Amiiformes (bowfins and their fossil relatives)

Possible specimens of caturoids are known from the Late Triassic, with the earliest unambiguous members being known from the Early Jurassic. Amiiformes had spread to North America and Africa by the end of the Middle Jurassic, reaching an apex of diversity during the Early Cretaceous, during the Late Cretaceous and Cenozoic, the group declined until only a single genus, Amia, containing the bowfin remained.

== Taxonomy ==
- Order Amiiformes Hay, 1929
  - Genus †Guizhouamia Liu, Yin & Wang, 2002
  - Genus †Otomitla Felix, 1891
  - Genus †Paraliodesmus Dunkle, 1969
  - Superfamily †Caturoidea
    - Genus †Eurypoma Huxley, 1866
    - Genus †Gymnoichthys? Tintori et al., 2010
    - Genus †Liodesmus Wagner, 1859
    - Genus †Strobilodus Wagner, 1851
    - Family †Caturidae Owen, 1860
      - Genus †Catutoichthys Gouiric-Cavalli, 2016
      - Genus †Amblysemius Agassiz, 1844
      - Genus †Caturus Agassiz, 1834
  - Superfamily Amioidea Bonaparte, 1838
    - Genus †Amiidarum? Lange, 1968 [Otolith]
    - Genus †Ferganamia? Kaznyshkin, 1990
    - Genus †Lehmanamia? Casier, 1966
    - Genus †Tomognathus Dixon, 1850
    - Family †Sinamiidae Berg, 1940
      - Genus †Ikechaoamia Liu, 1961
      - Genus †Siamamia Cavin et al., 2007
      - Genus †Sinamia Stensiö, 1935
    - Family Amiidae Bonaparte, 1837
      - Subfamily Amiinae Bonaparte, 1837 (sensu Grande & Bemis, 1998)
        - Genus Amia Linnaeus, 1766
        - Genus †Cyclurus Agassiz, 1839
        - Genus †Pseudamiatus Whitley, 1954
      - Subfamily †Amiopsinae Grande & Bemis, 1998
        - Genus †Amiopsis Kner, 1863
      - Subfamily †Solnhofenamiinae Grande & Bemis, 1998
        - Genus †Solnhofenamia Grande & Bemis, 1998
      - Subfamily †Vidalamiinae Grande & Bemis, 1998
        - Tribe †Calamopleurini Grande & Bemis, 1998
          - Genus †Calamopleurus Agassiz, 1841
          - Genus †Maliamia Patterson & Longbottom, 1989
        - Tribe †Vidalamiini Grande & Bemis, 1998
          - Genus †Melvius Bryant, 1987
          - Genus †Pachyamia Chalifa & Tchernov 1982
          - Genus †Vidalamia White & Moy-Thomas, 1941
          - Genus †Nipponamia Yabumoto, 1994
