= Melvius =

Melvius Temporal range: Late Cretaceous, 74.8–66 Ma Possible Turonian record

Scientific classification
- Kingdom: Animalia
- Phylum: Chordata
- Class: Actinopterygii
- Clade: Halecomorphi
- Order: Amiiformes
- Family: Amiidae
- Subfamily: †Vidalamiinae
- Tribe: †Vidalamiini
- Genus: †Melvius; Bryant, 1987

Type species
- †Melvius thomasi Bryant, 1987

Species
- †M. thomasi Bryant, 1879 (type); †M. chauliodous (Hall and Wolburg, 1989 [originally Amia? chauliodous])

Synonyms
- Amia? chauliodous Hall and Wolburg, 1989

Extinct genus of ray-finned fishes

Melvius is a genus of vidalamiin amiid ray-finned fish from the Late Cretaceous. The type species, Melvius thomasi, was described by Bryant in 1987 from Hell Creek Formation. A second species Melvius chauliodous, was named and described by Hall and Wolberg in 1989 from Kirtland Formation, and it is now considered to be one of the index taxa of the Kirtlandian land-vertebrate age.

== Description ==
Both species of Melvius were very large. A vertebral remain of M. thomasi would have belonged to a fish with standard length (length between tip of snout and the base of the caudal fin) of 161 cm (5.28 ft), and there are some specimens that exceed the height of that vertebra. Total length of this species would be at least 193–205 cm (6.33–6.73 ft). However, M. thomasi was dwarfed by M. chauliodous, as a specimen of M. chauliodous with abdominal centra which is 6.57 cm (2.59 in) wide would indicate a standard length of over 2 m (6.6 ft), and there is even larger abdominal centra which is 7.3 cm (2.9 in) wide.
