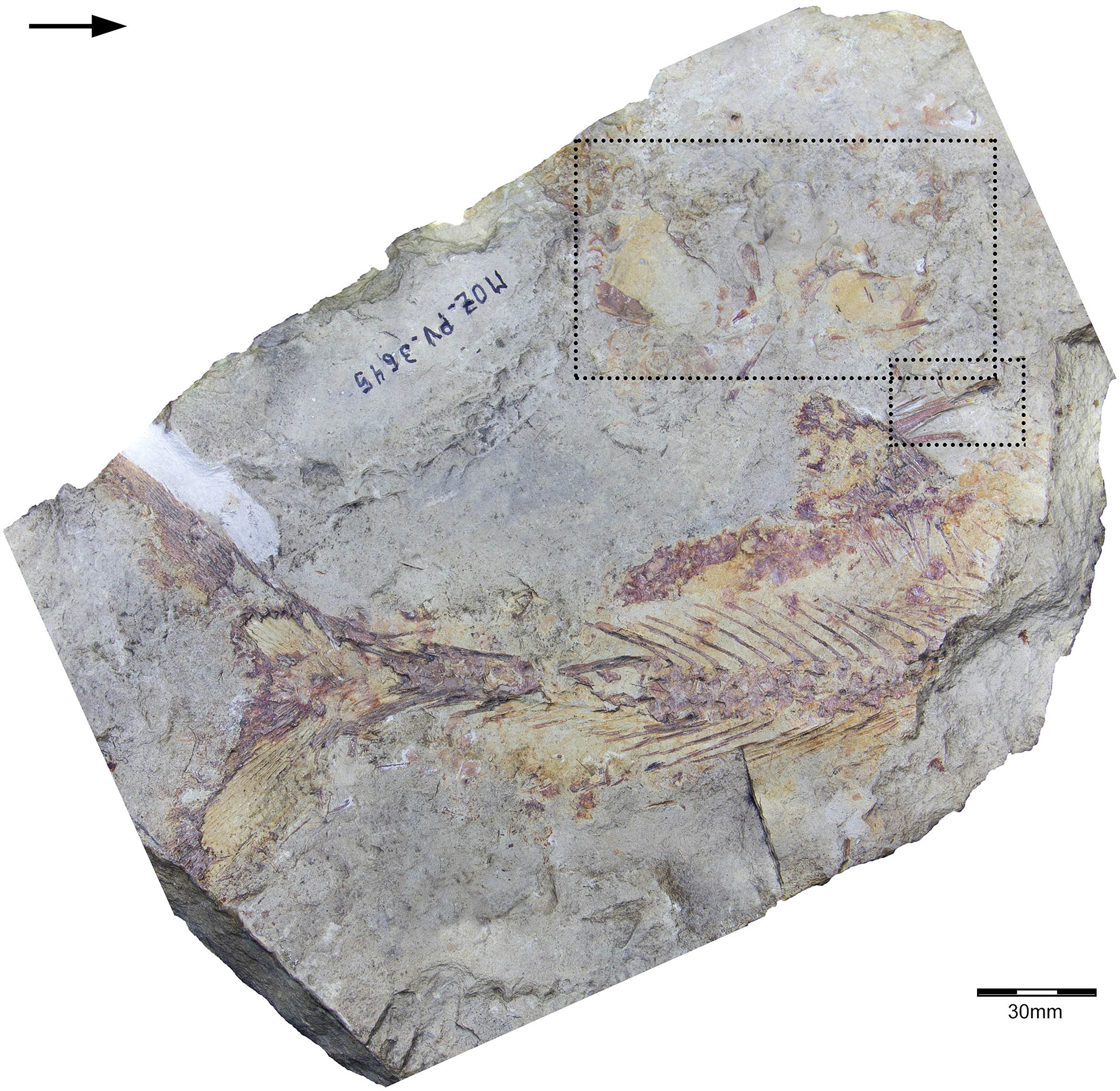
- Catutoichthys olsacheri, specimen MOZ-Pv 3645

Scientific classification
- Kingdom: Animalia
- Phylum: Chordata
- Class: Actinopterygii
- Clade: Halecomorphi
- Order: Amiiformes
- Family: †Caturidae
- Genus: †Catutoichthys; Gouiric-Cavalli, 2016
- Species: †C. olsacheri

Binomial name
- †Catutoichthys olsacheri Gouiric-Cavalli, 2016

= Catutoichthys =

Catutoichthys Temporal range: Late Jurassic

Extinct genus of fish

Catutoichthys is an extinct genus of amiiform fish belonging to the family Caturidae. The only species that has been found to be within this genus is Catutoichthys olsacheri.

It lived during the Late Jurassic period in the Vaca Muerta Formation, southwestern Gondwana in what is now Argentina. This makes Catutoichthys the earliest representative of the family Caturidae.
