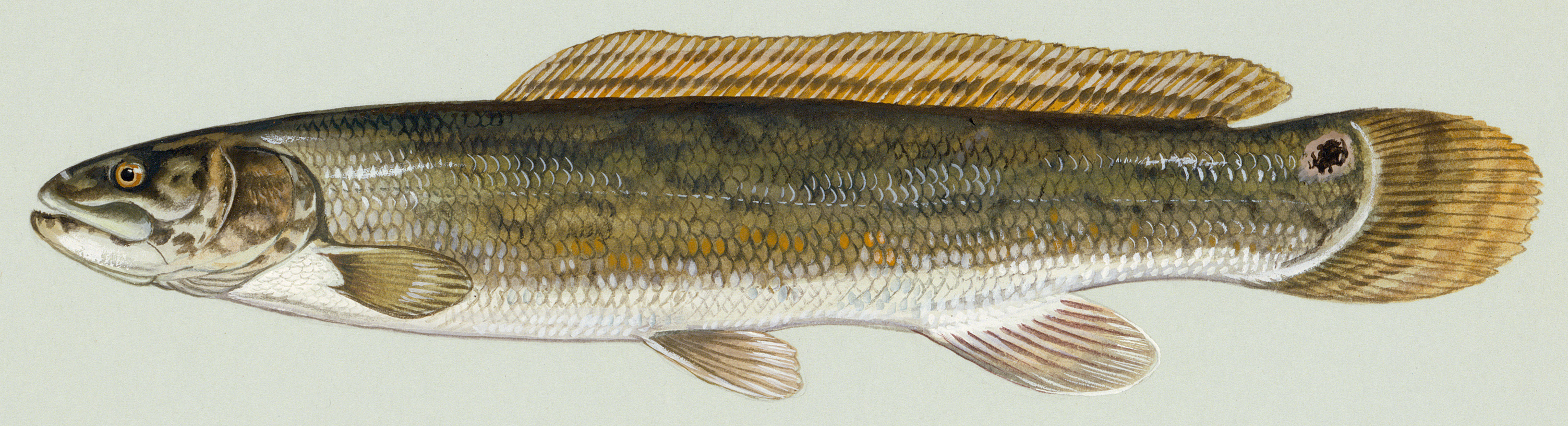
- Bowfin
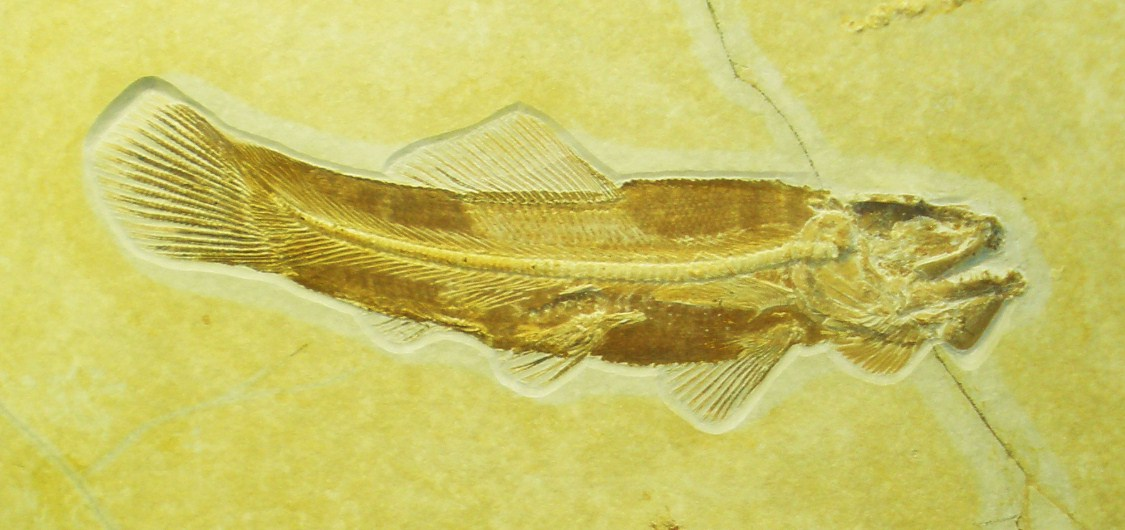
- Amiopsis (Late Jurassic, Germany)

Scientific classification
- Kingdom: Animalia
- Phylum: Chordata
- Class: Actinopterygii
- Clade: Halecomorphi
- Order: Amiiformes
- Family: Amiidae; Bonaparte, 1838

Subfamilies
- See text

= Amiidae =

Amiidae Temporal range: Late Jurassic–Recent

Family of ray-finned fishes

The Amiidae are a family of basal ray-finned fishes. The bowfin and the eyespot bowfin (Amia ocellicauda) are the only two species to survive today, although additional species in all four subfamilies of Amiidae are known from Jurassic, Cretaceous, and Eocene fossils.

Bowfins are now found throughout eastern North America, typically in slow-moving backwaters, canals, and ox-bow lakes. When the oxygen level is low (as often happens in still waters), the bowfin can rise to the surface and gulp air into its swim bladder, which is lined with blood vessels and can serve as a primitive lung.

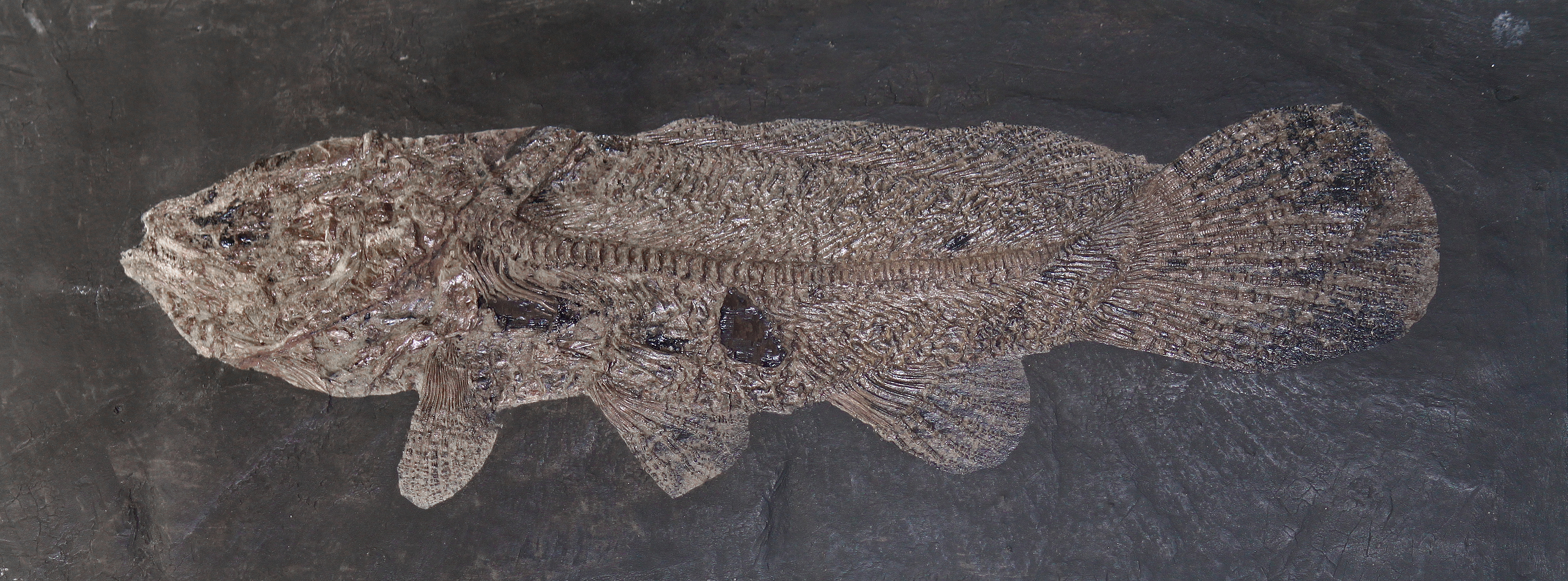
Cyclurus kehreri fossil from the Eocene of Germany

Amiidae is a monophyletic group that has numerous synapomorphic characters. Amiidae were widespread and particularly rich in species during the Eocene era. During this era, they appeared to be confined almost exclusively to fresh water.

== Taxonomy ==
The family is divided into five subfamilies, with 16 genera

- Amiidae
  - Subfamily Amiinae (latest Cretaceous -Present)
    - Genus Amia
    - Genus †Cyclurus
    - Genus †Pseudoamiatus
  - Subfamily †Amiopsinae (Late Jurassic)
    - Genus †Amiopsis
  - Subfamily †Solnhofenamiinae (Late Jurassic)
    - Genus †Solnhofenamia
  - Subfamily †Vidalamiinae (Early Cretaceous)
    - Genus †Calamopleurus
    - Genus †Maliamia
    - Genus †Melvius
    - Genus †Pachyamia
    - Genus †Vidalamia
  - Subfamily incertae sedis
    - Genus †Bakiribu?
    - Genus †Lehmanamia
    - Genus †Nipponamia
    - Genus †Hispanamia
  - Subfamily †Sinamiinae (Early Cretaceous)
    - Genus †Siamamia
    - Genus †Khoratamia
    - Genus †Sinamia
    - Genus †Ikechaoamia
